= Upton station (Pennsylvania Railroad) =

Railroad station

Upton

General information
- Coordinates: 40.0413°N 75.3478°W

Former services
Preceding station	Pennsylvania Railroad	Following station
Radnor toward Paoli	Paoli Line	Villanova toward Suburban Station
Location

Upton station was a former railroad station of the Pennsylvania Railroad outside of Philadelphia, Pennsylvania. It was constructed as a stop on the Pennsylvania Railroad's Main Line near the location where the rail line now crosses Interstate 476 between Villanova station and Radnor station, both of which are still operational as part of SEPTA Regional Rail Paoli/Thorndale Line service.

== Closure ==
A possibly apocryphal reason regarding the closure of the station has been attributed to former Pennsylvania Railroad president A. J. Cassatt. According to the story, a wealthy land owner that leased property to the railroad to have the station built on was angered when a train passed without stopping to allow guests of his to board at the station. After the incident, the land owner complained directly to Cassett in person. Cassett gave his word that a train would never fail to make a scheduled stop at the station again. To fulfill his promise, Cassatt promptly had the station closed and torn down before the next scheduled stop, with service redirected to the nearby Villanova and Radnor stations, making certain that the train would never miss a scheduled stop at Upton station again. The station is noted on an 1887 geological map of the area, suggesting service was available at least as late as that time.
