= Malvern station (SEPTA) =

Railway station in Malvern, Pennsylvania

Malvern
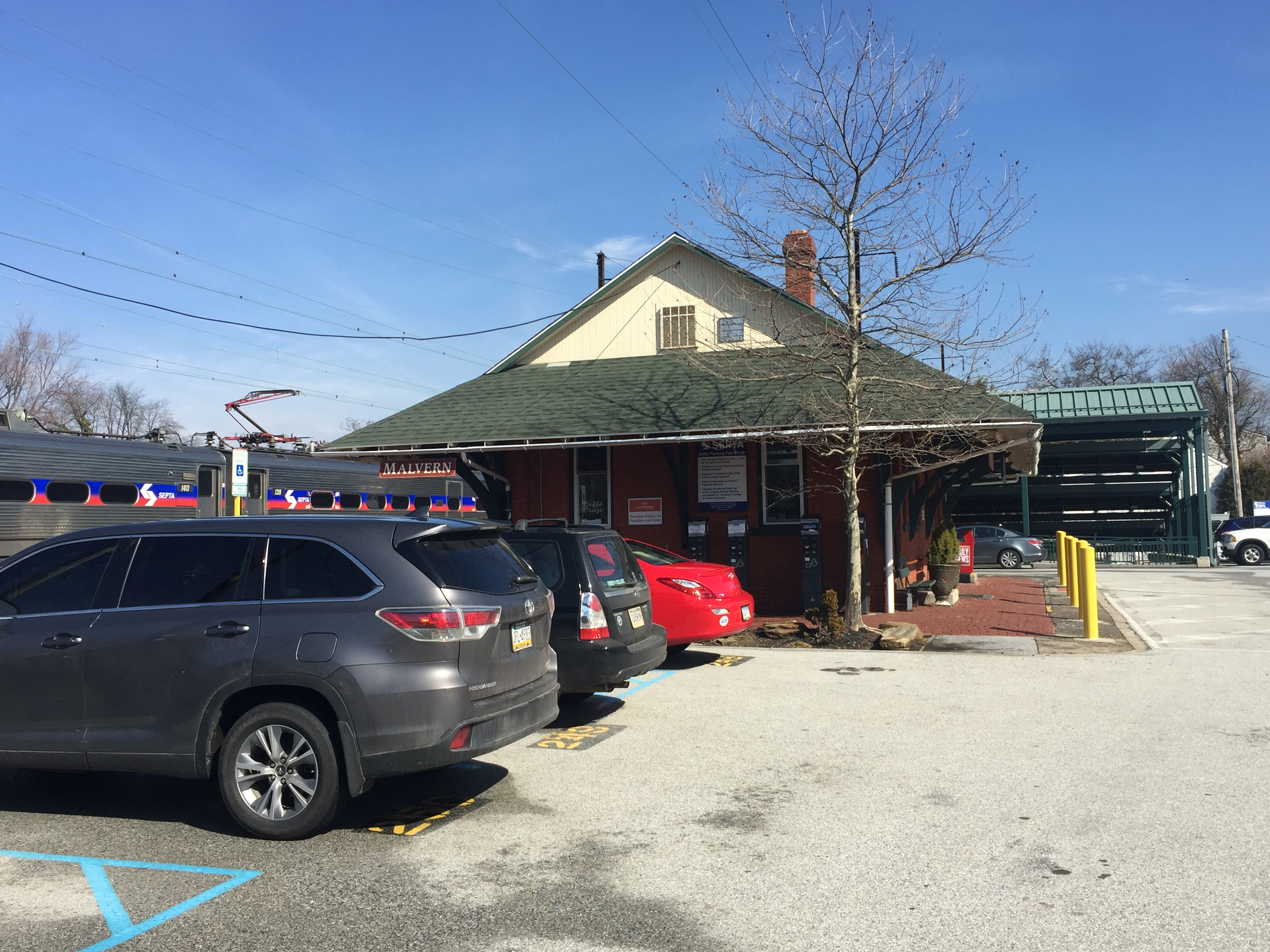

General information
- Location: 61 North Warren Avenue; Malvern, Pennsylvania; United States
- Coordinates: 40.0363°N 75.5155°W
- Owner: Amtrak
- Operator: SEPTA
- Line: Amtrak Philadelphia to Harrisburg Main Line (Keystone Corridor)
- Platforms: 2 side platforms
- Tracks: 2
- Connections: SEPTA Suburban Bus: 92

Construction
- Parking: 323 spaces (daily)
- Cycle facilities: 3 racks (6 spaces)
- Accessible: No, accessibility planned

Other information
- Fare zone: 4

History
- Opened: September 20, 1832
- Rebuilt: 2013
- Electrified: January 15, 1938

Passengers
- 2017: 811 boardings 825 alightings (weekday average)
- Rank: 23 of 146

Services
| Preceding station | SEPTA | Following station |
|---|---|---|
| Exton toward Thorndale | Paoli/Thorndale Line | Paoli toward Temple University |
| Exton toward Thorndale | Paoli/Thorndale Line Sunday and major holiday service | Terminus |
Former services
| Preceding station | Amtrak | Following station |
|---|---|---|
| Exton toward Harrisburg | Keystone Service Before 1988 | Paoli toward Philadelphia–Suburban |
| Preceding station | Pennsylvania Railroad | Following station |
| Frazer toward Chicago | Main Line | Green Tree toward New York or Exchange Place |
Location

Malvern station is a SEPTA Regional Rail and a former Amtrak station in Malvern, Pennsylvania. Located at West King Road and North Warren Avenue, it serves most Paoli/Thorndale Line trains. Until 1998, some Keystone Service trains stopped here as well.

There are 323 parking spaces at the station for daily parking. This station is 21.8 track miles from Philadelphia's Suburban Station. In 2017, the average total weekday boardings at this station was 811, and the average total weekday alightings was 825. Malvern is also the western terminal of the line on Sundays.

== History ==
The station was originally built in 1900 by the Pennsylvania Railroad. In 1968, it merged with its longtime rival New York Central Railroad to form the Penn Central Railroad. With railroad passenger service declining in the United States, passenger service was acquired by Amtrak in 1971 which ran Keystone and Keystone State Express trains. Penn Central continued to struggle to provide commuter service until it was acquired by Conrail in 1976, and SEPTA in 1983. SEPTA designated this as the R5 Paoli/Thorndale line.

In 2010 SEPTA began construction of a new passenger access tunnel along with handicap ramps and stairways to the platforms. The project included improved parking lots. SEPTA has received frequent criticism for spending $9.2 million to build the ramps because there is currently no way for a person in a wheelchair to get from the platform to the train. A person in a wheelchair, as of now, could only get from the parking lot to the station platform.

== Station layout ==
Malvern has two low-level side platforms. Some SEPTA trains terminate/originate here.

== Gallery ==
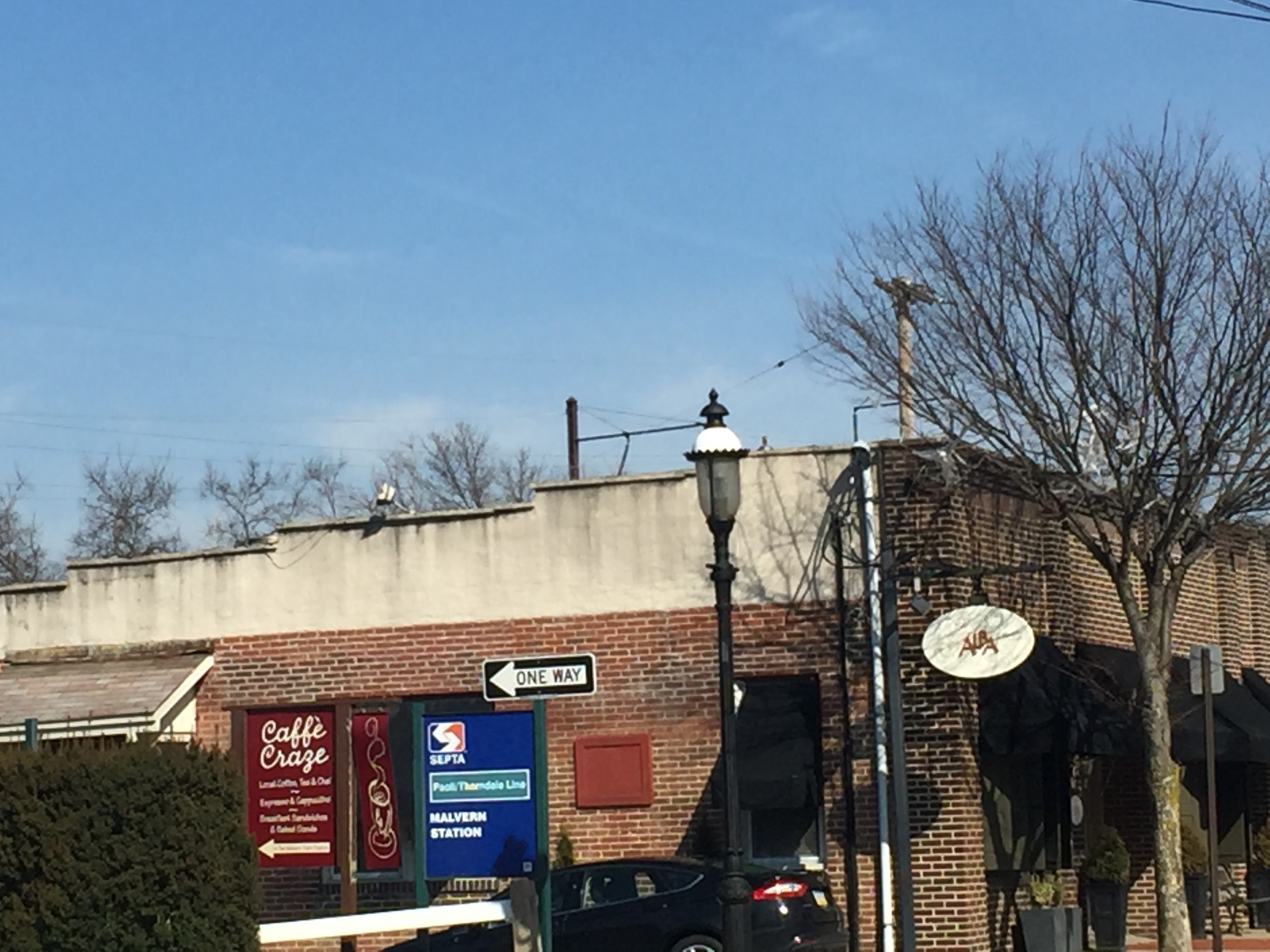
Station entrance

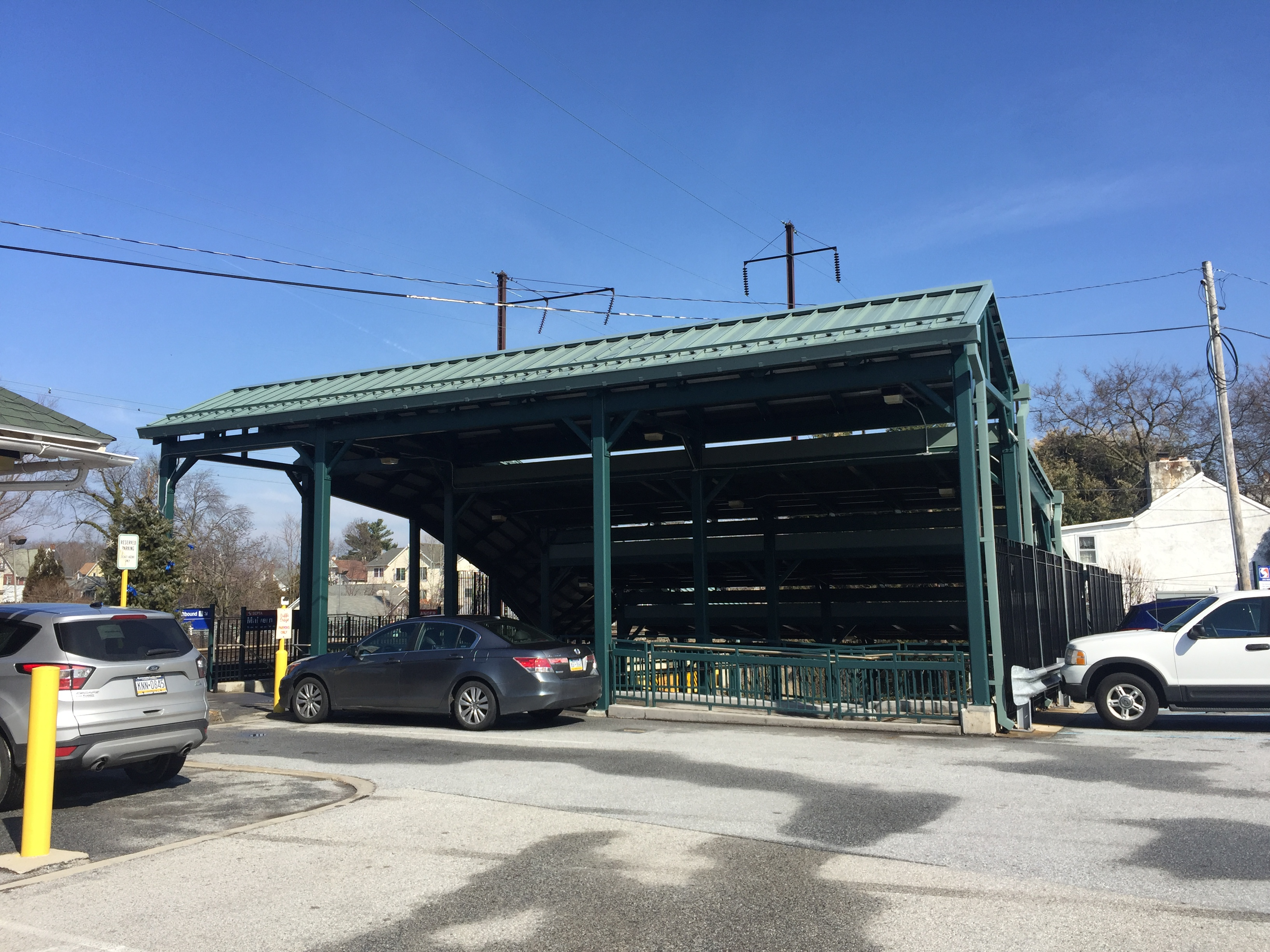
Handicap ramps

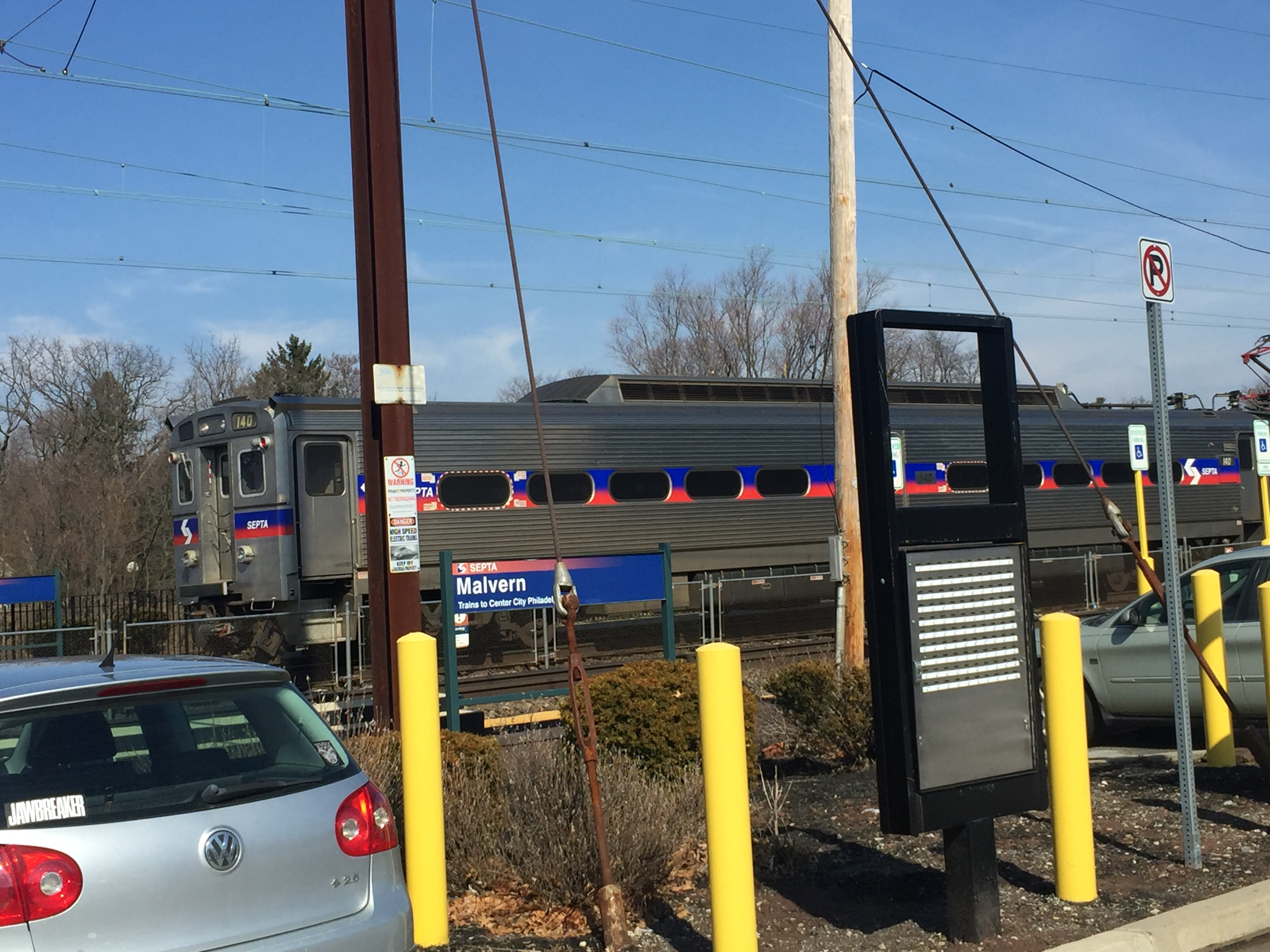
Station signage

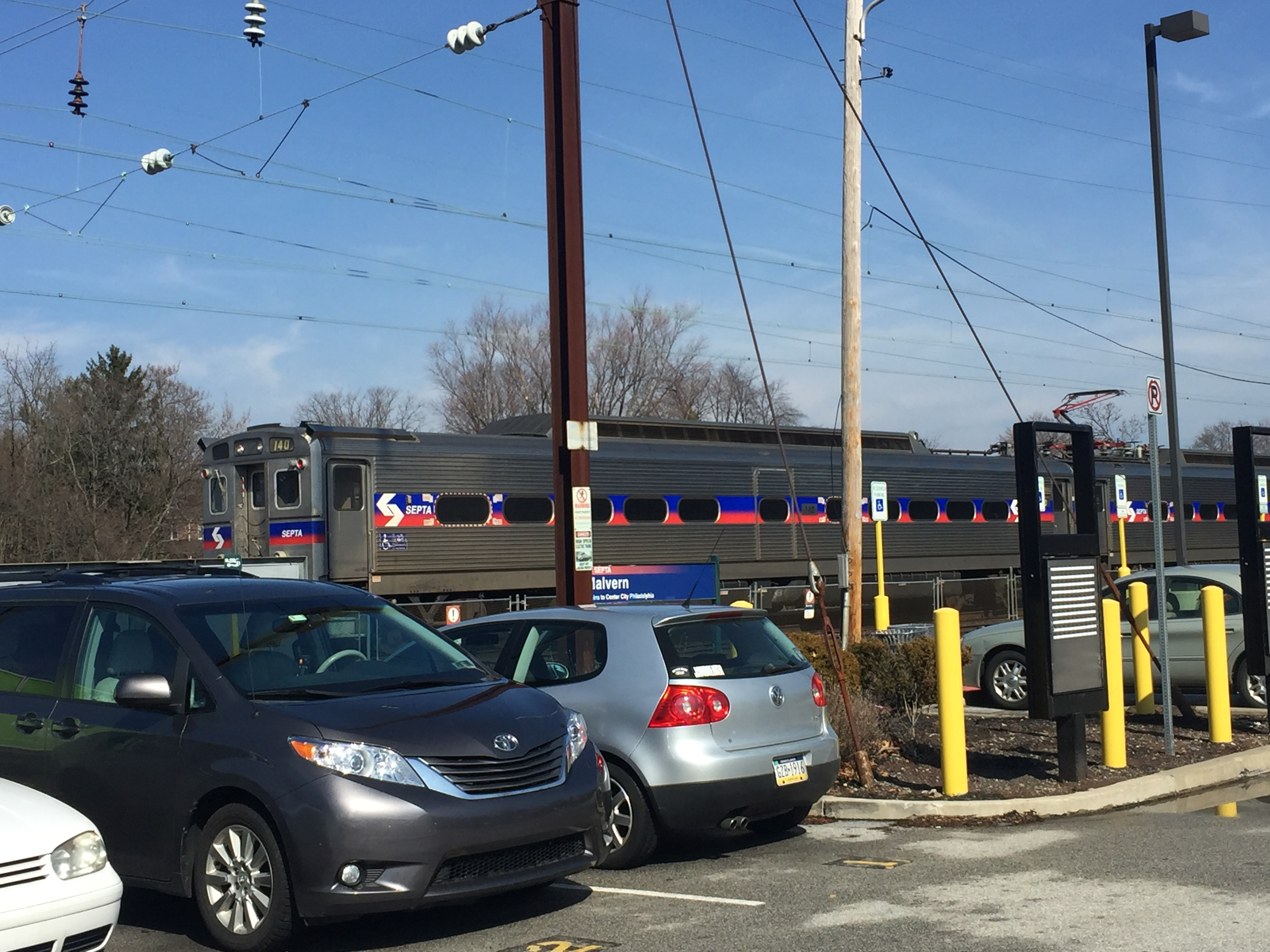
Westbound train

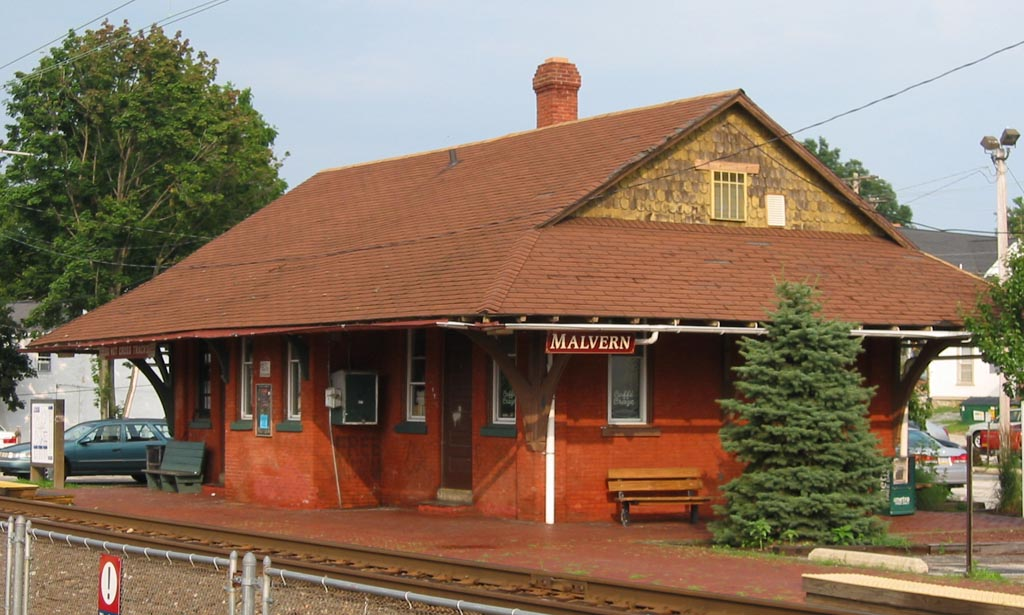
Station building
