= Villanova station (SEPTA Regional Rail) =

SEPTA Regional Rail station in Villanova, Pennsylvania

Villanova
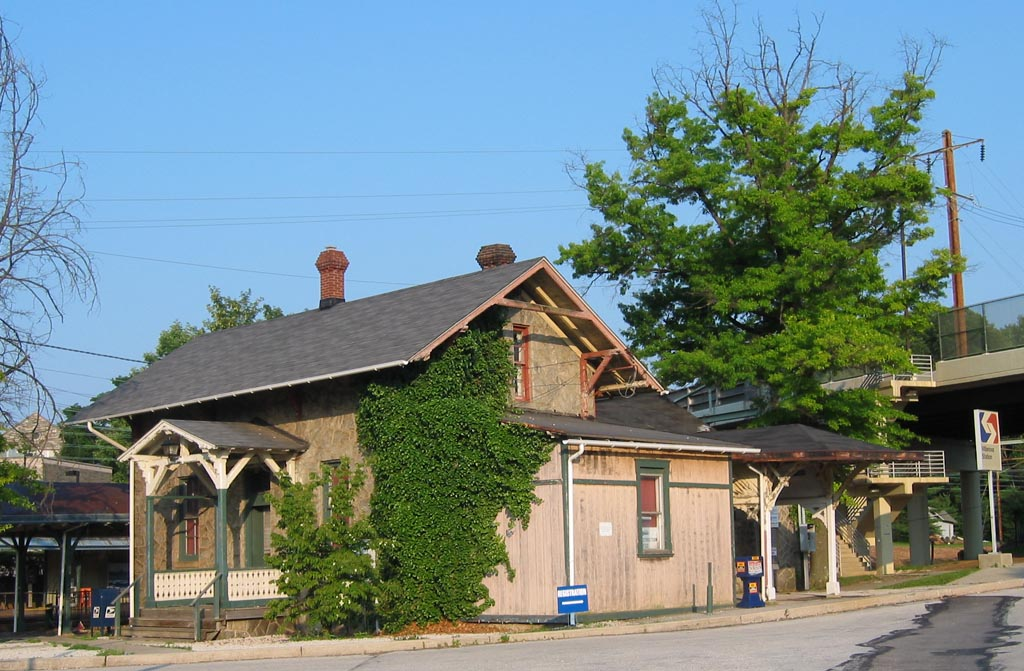

General information
- Location: 308 North Spring Mill Road; Villanova, Pennsylvania; United States
- Coordinates: 40.0388°N 75.3422°W
- Owner: Amtrak
- Operator: SEPTA
- Line: Amtrak Philadelphia to Harrisburg Main Line (Keystone Corridor)
- Platforms: 2 side platforms
- Tracks: 4
- Connections: SEPTA Suburban Bus: 105

Construction
- Parking: 167 spaces (85 daily, 82 permit)
- Cycle facilities: 5 racks (10 spaces)
- Accessible: No

Other information
- Fare zone: 3

History
- Opened: 1890; 136 years ago
- Electrified: September 11, 1915

Passengers
- 2017: 466 boardings 447 alightings (weekday average)
- Rank: 55 of 146

Services
Preceding station	SEPTA	Following station
Radnor toward Thorndale	Paoli/Thorndale Line	Rosemont toward Temple University
Former services
Preceding station	Pennsylvania Railroad	Following station
Upton toward Paoli	Paoli Line	Rosemont toward Suburban Station
Location

Villanova station is a SEPTA Regional Rail station on the campus of Villanova University in Villanova, Pennsylvania. It is in Radnor Township, located on North Spring Mill Road (PA 320) near County Line Road and serves most Paoli/Thorndale Line trains.

The station building was originally built in 1890 by the Pennsylvania Railroad and is within the campus of Villanova University. The eastbound and westbound platforms are ground-level and are connected by an underground handicap accessible pedestrian tunnel running beneath the tracks (which replaced the old non-handicapped accessible tunnel in 2018). The station building is also home to a small café called "Rosie's Coffee". There are 167 parking spaces at the station, including SEPTA permit parking. This station is 12.0 track miles from Philadelphia's Suburban Station. In 2017, the average total weekday boardings at this station was 466, and the average total weekday alightings was 447.

== Station layout ==
Villanova has two low-level side platforms with pathways connecting the platforms to the inner tracks.
