= Paoli/Thorndale Line =

SEPTA Regional Rail service

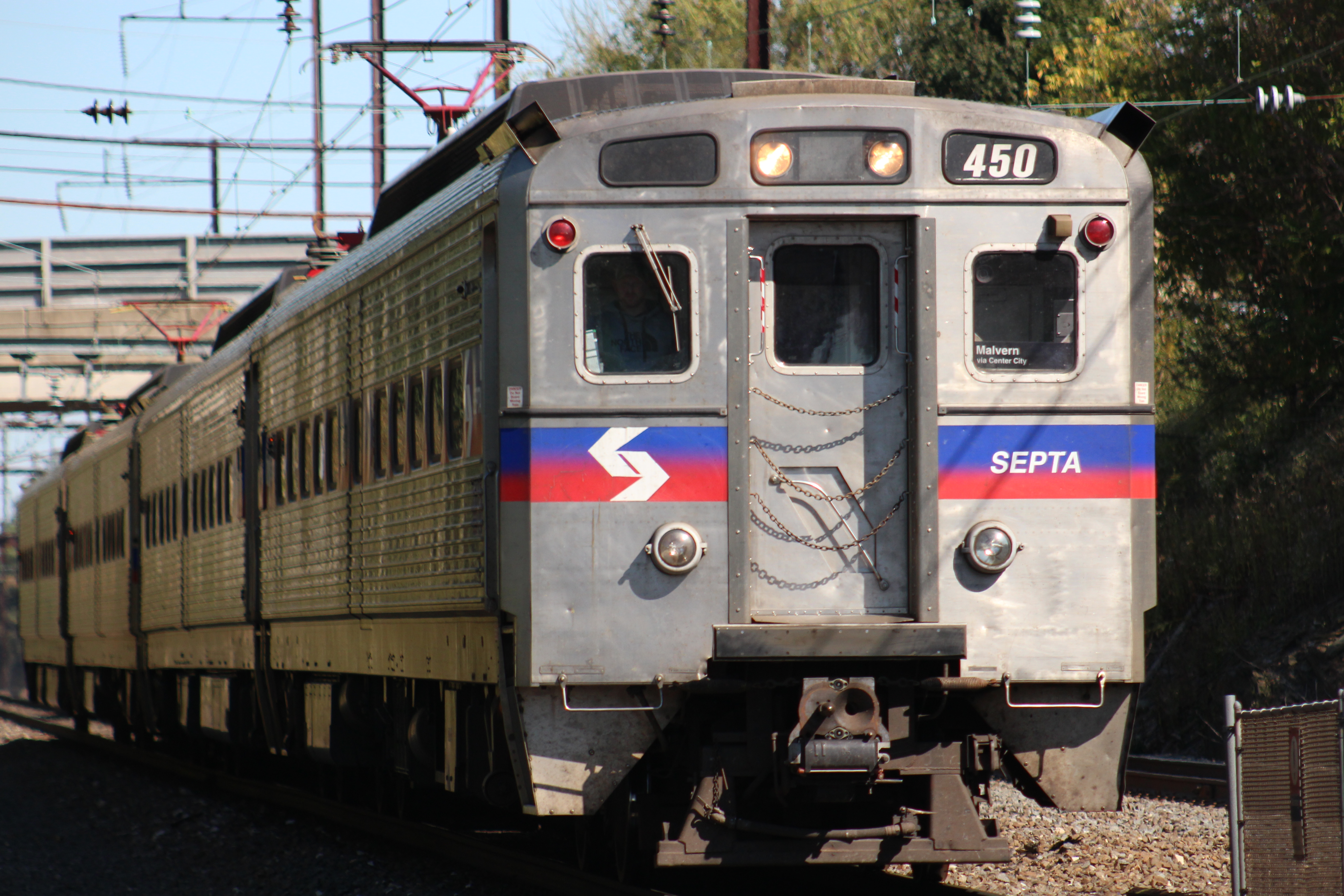
- A westbound Paoli/Thorndale Line train arriving at Malvern

Overview
- Service type: Commuter rail
- System: SEPTA Regional Rail
- Status: Operating
- Current operator: SEPTA Regional Rail
- Daily ridership: 11,234 (FY 2025)
- Website: septa.org

Route
- Termini: Temple University; Thorndale
- Stops: 26
- Line used: Philadelphia–Harrisburg

Technical
- Rolling stock: Electric Multiple Units, push-pull trains
- Track gauge: 4 ft 8 1/2 in (1,435 mm) standard gauge
- Electrification: Overhead line, 12 kV 25 Hz AC

The Paoli/Thorndale Line, commonly known as the Main Line, is a SEPTA Regional Rail service running from Center City Philadelphia through Montgomery County and Delaware County to Thorndale in Chester County. It operates along the far eastern leg of Amtrak's Philadelphia to Harrisburg Main Line, which in turn was once the Main Line of the Pennsylvania Railroad and is now part of the Keystone Corridor, a federally-designated high-speed rail corridor.

== Route ==
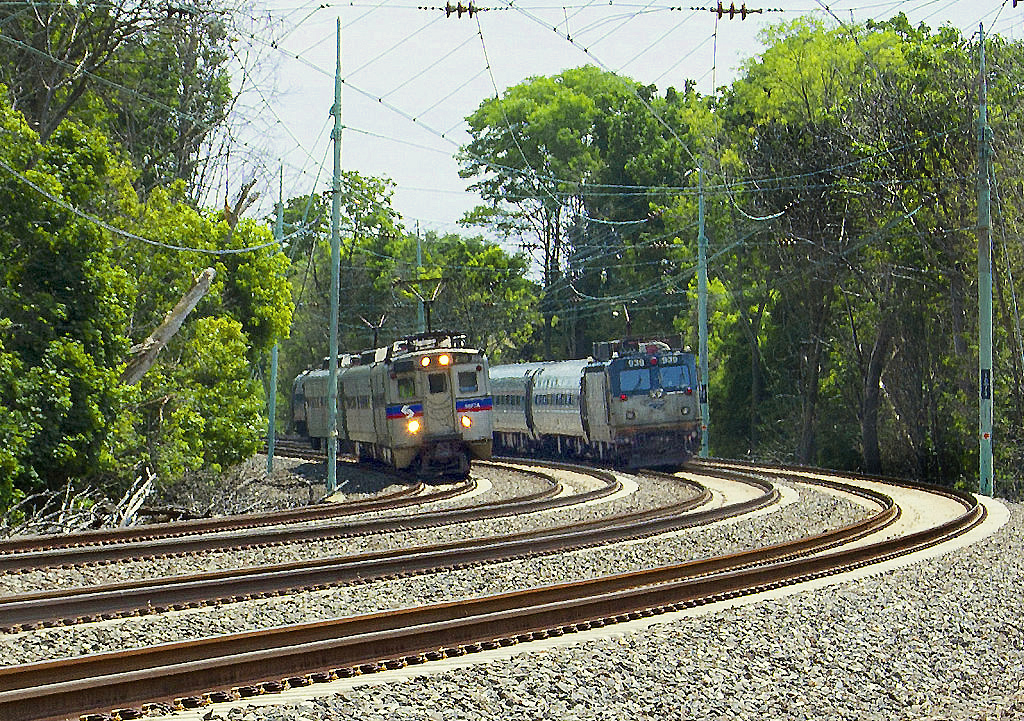
SEPTA and Amtrak share the four-track Main Line grade of the "Keystone Corridor" between Philadelphia and Thorndale

This branch makes local stops between Thorndale and Center City Philadelphia along Amtrak's Philadelphia to Harrisburg Main Line, an electrified 104-mile two to four-track high-speed route between Harrisburg Transportation Center in Harrisburg and 30th Street Station in Philadelphia. The line was originally part of Pennsylvania's "Main Line of Public Works", a series of canals and railroads to connect Philadelphia with Harrisburg, Pittsburgh, and points west built between 1826 and 1834 by the Commonwealth of Pennsylvania. The tracks subsequently became part of the Main Line of the Pennsylvania Railroad before eventually becoming Amtrak's Keystone Corridor. The Main Line also refers to the affluent Philadelphia suburbs along the line of the same name.

Prior to the late 1980s, all commuter rail operations went from Suburban Station to Paoli, the westernmost census-designated place along the Main Line. Because of this earlier operation, local residents called the R5 "the Paoli Local". Currently, all Paoli turn-around trains, which operate alternately on Saturdays and exclusively on Sundays, now use the nearby Malvern train station as its last stop (the Paoli train yard was closed down in the mid-1990s and was converted into extra parking, and a new Paoli train station), and use the Frazer train yard as a turn-around location. The Paoli yard became an EPA superfund site. Prior to November 10, 1996, the service went as far west as Parkesburg, but service was truncated to Downingtown because Amtrak lacked facilities to turn SEPTA trains around, and trains were forced to deadhead out to Lancaster. Service was extended from Downingtown to a new station in Thorndale on November 22, 1999.

== Operation ==
The Paoli/Thorndale Line is the busiest regional rail line in the SEPTA system, carrying approximately 21,000 daily riders each weekday prior to the COVID-19 pandemic. It is also among the longest in the system, stretching out into the far western suburbs of Philadelphia, and as such has express service to some of the outer stations. In general, express trains operate one of the following four itineraries:

- Local from 30th Street only to Bryn Mawr, making all intermediate stops then return to 30th Street;
- Express from 30th Street to Bryn Mawr, and then local to Malvern;
- Express from 30th Street to Bryn Mawr, and then local to Thorndale;
- Express from 30th Street to Wayne, and then local to Thorndale.

There was also a round trip "Great Valley Flyer" service which ran as an express between 30th Street and Paoli, skipping all intermediate stops before continuing to Thorndale. This was the last named train on SEPTA, and one of very few remaining named commuter trains in the nation.

Amid the onset of the COVID-19 pandemic in 2020, service was curtailed, and all trains ran as locals. In the new schedule effective December 19, 2021, express service from 30th Street to Bryn Mawr and Wayne resumed, but express trains between 30th Street and Paoli were not restored. In addition to the express service changes, during the COVID-19 pandemic, the western terminus of service on the line was briefly truncated to Malvern. Service to Thorndale resumed in June 2020, though Sunday service continues to only reach Malvern, ending before Exton, Whitford, Downingtown, or Thorndale stations.

== History ==

Electrified service between Philadelphia and Paoli was opened on September 11, 1915. As the Pennsylvania Railroad's first local commuter to be electrified, the line was used as an "experiment" for powering trains using AC overhead catenary wires. A previous commuter line to be electrified was the Long Island Rail Road in New York City, but this line used the DC third rail similar in nature to the New York City Subway system and most other heavy-rail interurbans. In addition, the original catenary poles are still in service in Lower Merion. This was also the first line to get PRR position light signals between Overbrook and Bryn Mawr.

Between 1915 and the 1960s, the former Pennsylvania Railroad used the MP-54 electric multiple-unit (EMU) railcars, which were brick red ("Tuscan Red") in color (green in the Penn Central era) and had characteristic "owl eye" round windows at car ends.

The MP-54s were replaced in the 1960s and 1970s with the Silverliner EMU cars, which are still in use today. More recently, SEPTA acquired push-pull coaches from the Bombardier corporation, which were hauled by AEM-7 electric locomotives similar to those used by Amtrak and New Jersey Transit. The AEM-7 locomotives were replaced with ACS-64 electric locomotives in 2018.

Between 1984 and 2010 the route was designated R5 Paoli and R5 Thorndale as part of SEPTA's diametrical reorganization of its lines. Paoli trains operated through the city center to the Lansdale/Doylestown Line on the ex-Reading side of the system. The R-number naming system was dropped on July 25, 2010. As of 2026, most Paoli/Thorndale Line trains either terminate at Temple University or continue through Center City to points along the West Trenton Line on weekdays and on the Fox Chase Line on weekends.

As a part of the Keystone Corridor upgrade projects conducted by Amtrak and PennDOT, the line was upgraded in 2007 with new concrete ties, continuous welded rails, and overhead lines and substations. This upgrade allows SEPTA and Amtrak to operate multiple trains at the same time in the same manner as that found on the Northeast Corridor.

A recent proposal to extend the Paoli/Thorndale Line service further west from its terminus at Thorndale to Lancaster has been discussed by regional planning organizations, government officials, and members supporting the Capital Red Rose Corridor, which will provide commuter rail along the Philadelphia to Harrisburg Main Line between Lancaster and Harrisburg. Proponents of the Paoli/Thorndale Line extension to Lancaster, support that by allowing SEPTA and Capital Area Transit to operate commuter rail serving smaller stations along the Keystone Corridor, it will allow for fewer stops and increased speeds for Amtrak's Keystone and Pennsylvanian trains between Philadelphia's 30th Street Station and the Harrisburg Transportation Center in downtown Harrisburg. It is also suggested by community leaders and transportation officials that the addition of commuter rail serving portions of Lancaster and Dauphin counties will help to alleviate future traffic congestion stemming from increased development along the same corridor. The entire main line between Thorndale, Lancaster and Harrisburg is currently electrified.

SEPTA activated positive train control on the Paoli/Thorndale Line on May 1, 2017.

SEPTA announced on March 7, 2019, that service would be extended back to Coatesville "in the near future." A new Coatesville station is planned to be constructed by the Pennsylvania Department of Transportation (PennDOT) at 3rd Avenue and Fleetwood Street near the existing Amtrak station. The station is currently in the design phase and once construction begins, it will take three years to complete and bring SEPTA service to Coatesville. In announcing the return of service to Coatesville, Chester County commissioner Terrence Farrell announced $1 million in funding to kick-start a parking garage to coincide with SEPTA's return to the station via the Paoli/Thorndale Line.

In June 2025, as part of a set of SEPTA budget cuts, it was proposed that the Paoli/Thorndale Line would be discontinued on January 1, 2026. However, on September 5, 2025, SEPTA canceled the planned service cuts due to a court order being issued to restore SEPTA services. Instead, SEPTA implemented a fare increase that went into effect on September 14th.

== Stations ==
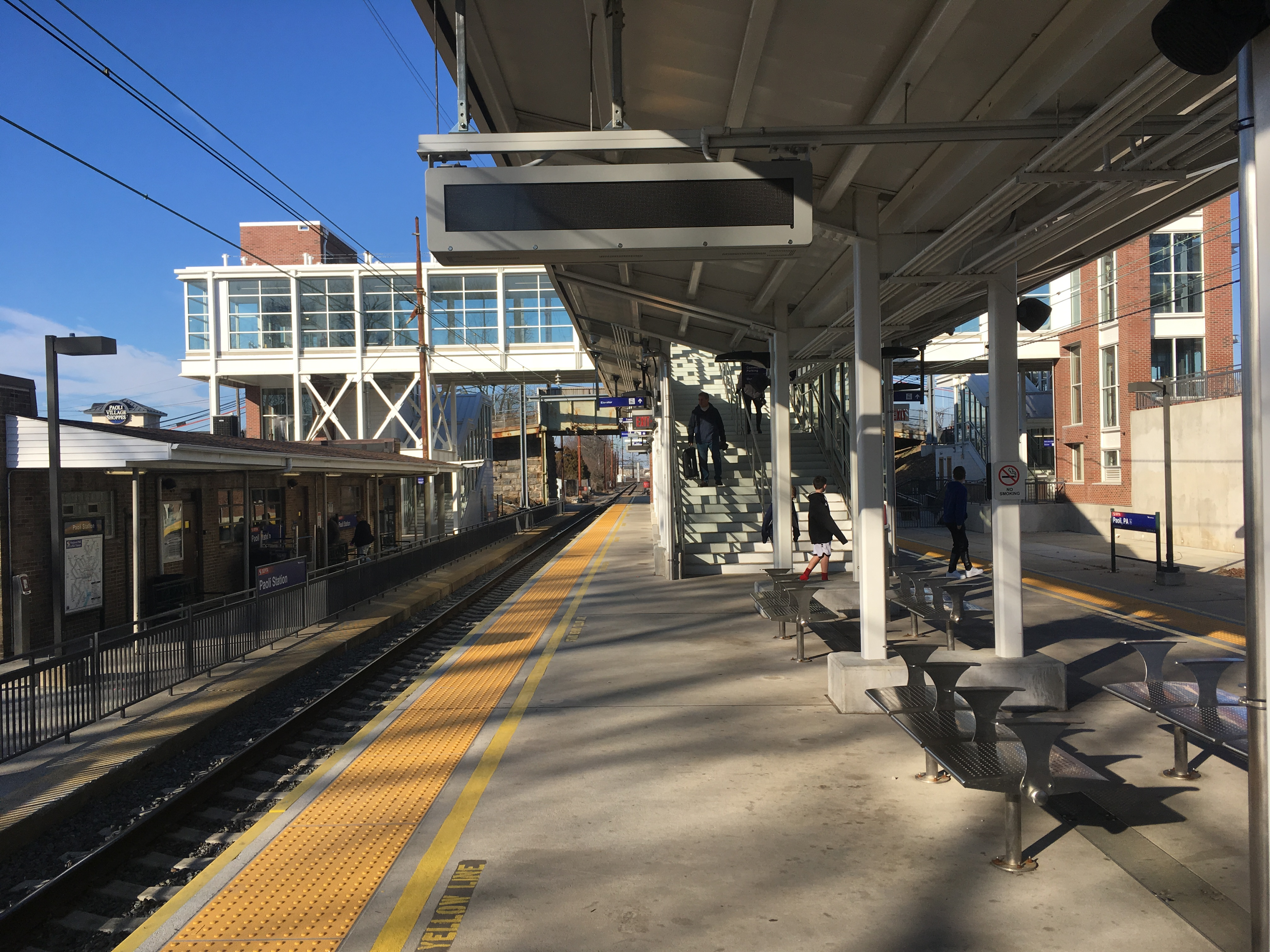
Paoli station, a major stop along the Paoli/Thorndale Line

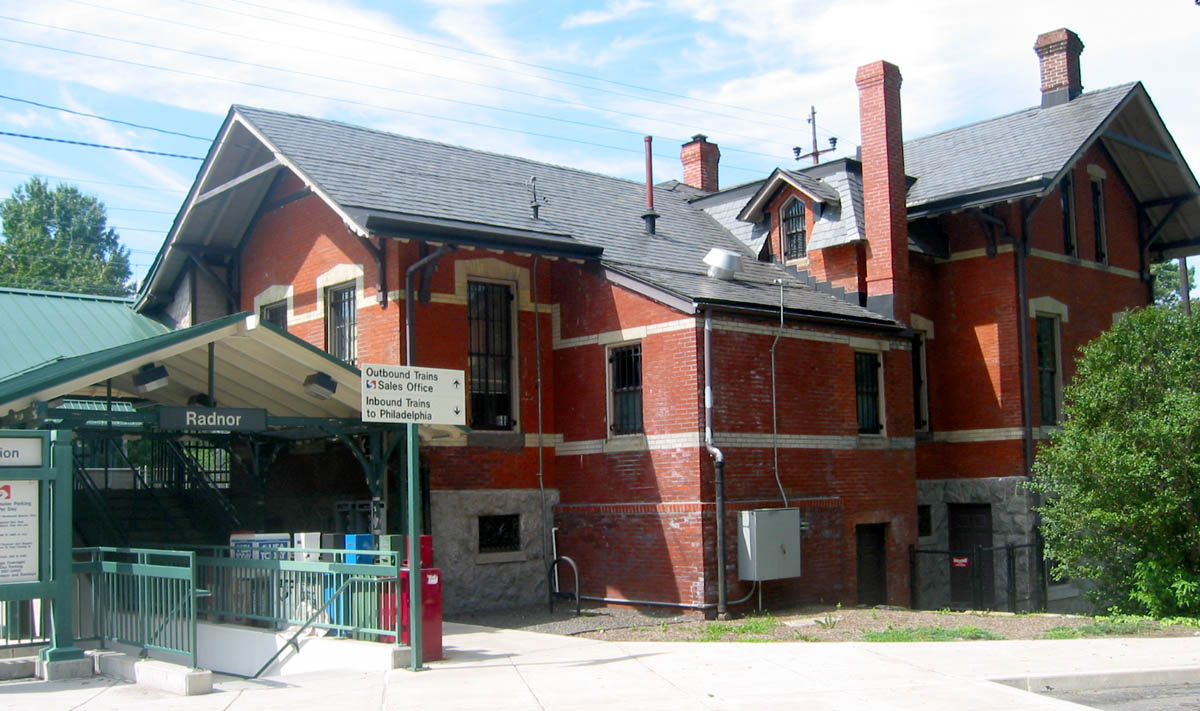
The Pennsylvania Railroad opened Radnor in 1872

The Paoli/Thorndale Line includes the following stations west of the Center City Commuter Connection; stations indicated with a gray background are closed.

| Zone | Location | Station | Miles (km) from Center City | Opened | Closed | Connections / notes |
|---|---|---|---|---|---|---|
| C | Parkside, Philadelphia | 52nd Street | 4.0 (6.4) | 1902 | August 23, 1980 | |
| 2 | Overbrook, Philadelphia | Overbrook | 5.4 (8.7) | 1860 | | SEPTA City Bus: 63, 65 |
| 2 | Merion | Merion | 6.0 (9.7) | 1914 | | |
| 2 | Narberth | Narberth | 6.8 (10.9) | | | SEPTA City Bus: 44 |
| 2 | Wynnewood | Wynnewood | 7.4 (11.9) | 1870 | | SEPTA Suburban Bus: 105 |
| 2 | Ardmore | Ardmore | 8.5 (13.7) | 1870 | | Amtrak: Keystone Service; SEPTA City Bus: 44; SEPTA Suburban Bus: 103, 105 |
| 2 | Haverford | Haverford | 9.1 (14.6) | 1880 | | SEPTA Suburban Bus: 105 |
| 3 | Bryn Mawr | Bryn Mawr | 10.1 (16.3) | 1869 | | SEPTA Suburban Bus: 105 |
| 3 | Rosemont | Rosemont | 10.9 (17.5) | 1880 | | SEPTA Suburban Bus: 105 |
| 3 | Villanova | Villanova | 12.0 (19.3) | 1890 | | SEPTA Suburban Bus: 105 |
| 3 | Radnor | Radnor | 13.0 (20.9) | 1872 | | SEPTA Suburban Bus: 105 |
| 3 | Wayne | St. Davids | 13.7 (22.0) | 1890 | | |
| 3 | Wayne | Wayne | 14.5 (23.3) | 1882–1884 | | SEPTA Suburban Bus: 105 |
| 3 | Wayne | Strafford | 15.4 (24.8) | | | |
| 3 | Devon | Devon | 16.4 (26.4) | 1883 | | SEPTA Suburban Bus: 105 |
| 3 | Berwyn | Berwyn | 17.5 (28.2) | 1884 | | SEPTA Suburban Bus: 105 |
| 3 | Berwyn | Daylesford | 18.6 (29.9) | | | SEPTA Suburban Bus: 105 |
| 4 | Paoli | Paoli | 19.9 (32.0) | 1893 | | Amtrak: Keystone Service, Pennsylvanian; SEPTA Suburban Bus: 92, 105, 204, 206 |
| 4 | Malvern | Malvern | 21.8 (35.1) | September 20, 1832 | | SEPTA Suburban Bus: 92 |
| 4 | Exton | Exton | 27.7 (44.6) | | | Amtrak: Keystone Service, Pennsylvanian; SEPTA Suburban Bus: 135 |
| 4 | Exton | Whitford | 28.7 (46.2) | | | |
| 4 | Downingtown | Downingtown | 32.8 (52.8) | October 7, 1834 | | Amtrak: Keystone Service; SEPTA Suburban Bus: 135 |
| 4 | Thorndale | Thorndale | 35.2 (56.6) | November 22, 1999 | | SEPTA Suburban Bus: 135 |
| 4 | Coatesville | Coatesville | 38.1 (61.3) | | November 10, 1996 | Amtrak: Keystone Service |
| 4 | Parkesburg | Parkesburg | 43.9 (70.7) | | November 10, 1996 | Amtrak: Keystone Service |

== Ridership ==
The Paoli/Thorndale Line has the highest total ridership on the system. Between FY 2013–FY 2019 yearly ridership ranged from 6–6.5 million, save a drop to 5.5 million in FY 2017. In FY 2019 its 6,170,950 passengers exceeded the next highest, the Lansdale/Doylestown Line, by nearly 1.2 million. Ridership suffered a major collapse following during the COVID-19 pandemic, and has not returned to pre-pandemic levels since. (Note: Data for individual lines is not available for FY 2020.)

- Annual Ridership
- Annual Ticket Revenue

== Bibliography ==
- Hocker, Edward W. (1960). "Montgomery County History" (PDF). Bulletin of the Historical Society of Montgomery County Pennsylvania. XII (2, 3).
