= Rosemont station (SEPTA) =

Railway station in Rosemont, Pennsylvania

Rosemont
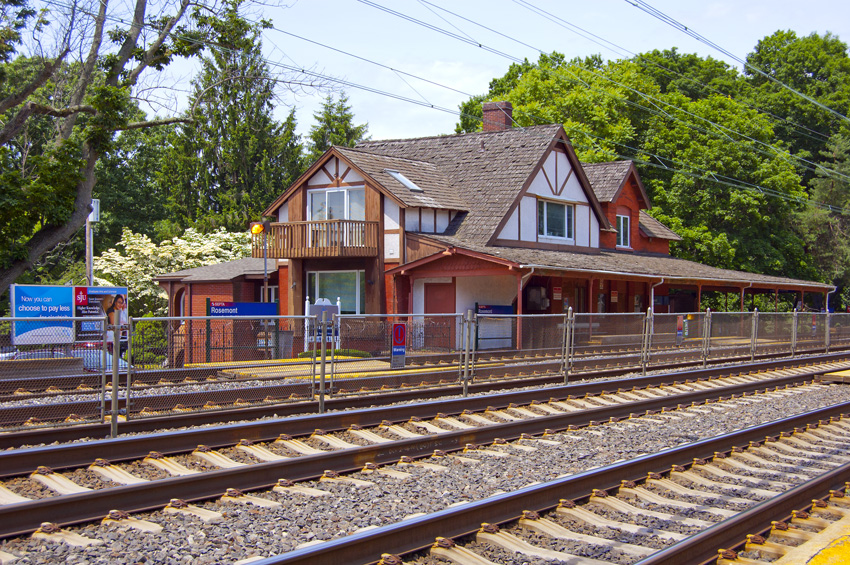

General information
- Location: 43 Airdale Road; Rosemont, Pennsylvania; United States
- Coordinates: 40.0281°N 75.3274°W
- Owner: Amtrak
- Operator: SEPTA
- Line: Amtrak Philadelphia to Harrisburg Main Line (Keystone Corridor)
- Platforms: 2 side platforms
- Tracks: 4
- Connections: SEPTA Suburban Bus: 105

Construction
- Parking: 112 spaces (90 daily, 22 permit)
- Cycle facilities: 5 racks (10 spaces)
- Accessible: No

Other information
- Fare zone: 3

History
- Opened: 1880
- Electrified: September 11, 1915

Passengers
- 2017: 323 boardings 321 alightings (weekday average)
- Rank: 81 of 146

Services
Preceding station	SEPTA	Following station
Villanova toward Thorndale	Paoli/Thorndale Line	Bryn Mawr toward Temple University
Former services
Preceding station	Pennsylvania Railroad	Following station
Villanova toward Paoli	Paoli Line	Bryn Mawr toward Suburban Station
Location

Rosemont station is a SEPTA Regional Rail station in Rosemont, Pennsylvania. It is located at Airdale Road and Montrose Avenues and is served by most Paoli/Thorndale Line trains.

The station was originally built by the Pennsylvania Railroad between 1863 and 1871 (appears on 1871 atlas). As a modern SEPTA station, the building is also occupied by a real estate broker's office and underwent renovations for this use in 1983. The ticket office at this station is open weekdays 6:00 AM to 10:55 AM excluding holidays. There are 112 parking spaces at the station. This station is 10.9 track miles from Philadelphia's Suburban Station. In 2017, the average total weekday boardings at this station was 323, and the average total weekday alightings was 321.

== Station layout ==
Rosemont has two low-level side platforms with pathways connecting the platforms to the inner tracks.
