= Devon station =

Railway station in Devon, Pennsylvania

Devon
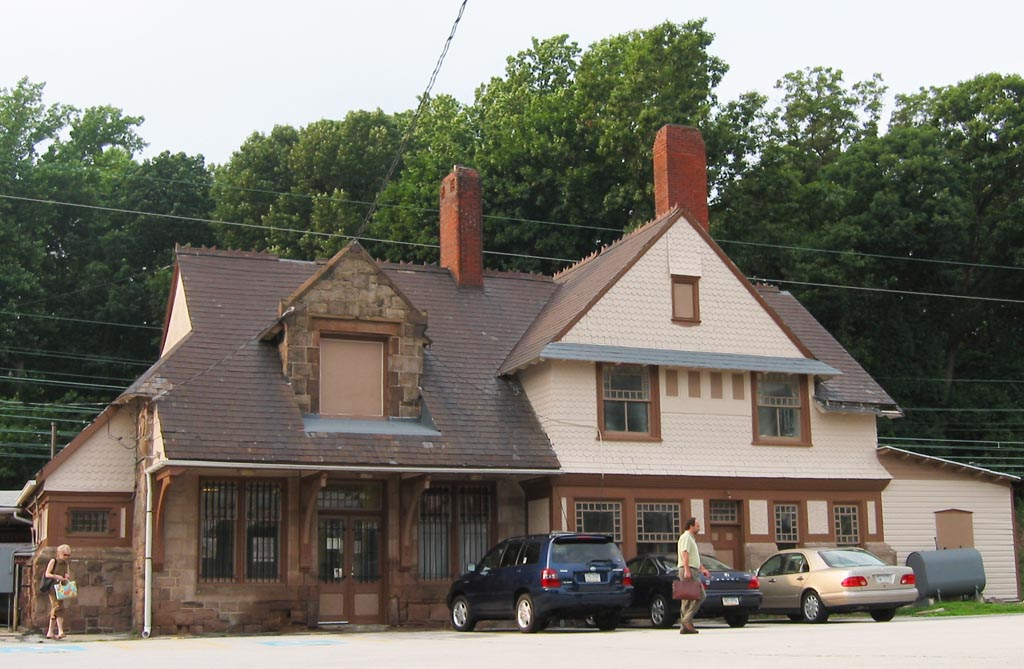

General information
- Location: 1 North Devon Boulevard; Devon, Pennsylvania; United States
- Coordinates: 40.0472°N 75.4228°W
- Owner: Amtrak
- Operator: SEPTA
- Line: Amtrak Philadelphia to Harrisburg Main Line (Keystone Corridor)
- Platforms: 2 side platforms
- Tracks: 4
- Connections: SEPTA Suburban Bus: 105

Construction
- Parking: 166 spaces (daily)
- Cycle facilities: 4 racks (8 spaces)
- Accessible: No
- Architect: W. Bleddyn Powell

Other information
- Fare zone: 3

History
- Opened: 1883
- Electrified: September 11, 1915

Passengers
- 2017: 455 boardings 364 alightings (weekday average)
- Rank: 56 of 146

Services
Preceding station	SEPTA	Following station
Berwyn toward Thorndale	Paoli/Thorndale Line	Strafford toward Temple University
Former services
Preceding station	Pennsylvania Railroad	Following station
Berwyn toward Paoli	Paoli Line	Strafford toward Suburban Station
Location

Devon station is a commuter rail station located in the western suburbs of Philadelphia at 98 North Devon Boulevard and Lancaster Avenue in Devon, Pennsylvania, United States. It is served by most Paoli/Thorndale Line trains.

Devon station was originally built by the Pennsylvania Railroad and opened in 1883. The architect, W. Bleddyn Powell, designed the building to match the English aesthetic established by Devon developers Coffin & Altemus, who contributed toward the station's construction. Replacing an older station a short distance to the east built just a year before, the station was positioned to be in alignment with the first Devon Inn built in 1882.

The old baggage shelter was demolished in 2004. The station building was repainted in 2005.

The ticket office at this station is open weekdays from 5:50 a.m. to 1:15 p.m. excluding holidays. There are 166 parking spaces available for daily parking at the station.

This station is 16.4 track miles from Philadelphia's Suburban Station. In 2017, the average total weekday boardings at this station was 455, and the average total weekday alightings was 364.

== Station layout ==
Devon has two low-level side platforms with pathways connecting the platforms to the inner tracks.
