= Philadelphia to Harrisburg Main Line =

Amtrak railway line

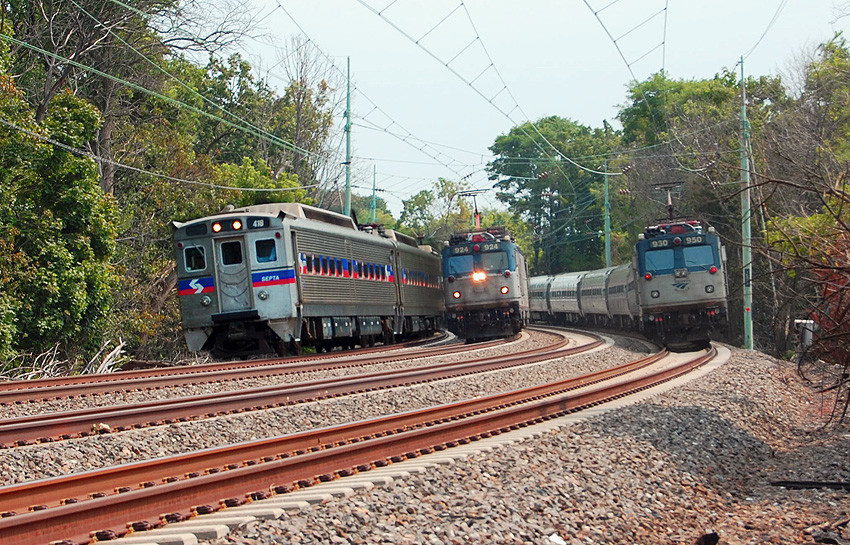
- Amtrak and SEPTA Regional Rail service share operations over the Main Line grade between Philadelphia and Thorndale.

Overview
- Status: Operating
- Owner: Amtrak
- Locale: Pennsylvania
- Termini: Suburban Station (Physical Line) 30th Street Station (Intercity Service); Harrisburg Transportation Center
- Connecting lines: Pittsburgh Line
- Stations: 31

Service
- Type: Higher-speed rail Inter-city rail Commuter rail
- System: Amtrak; Norfolk Southern Railway
- Services: Keystone Service, Pennsylvanian, Paoli/Thorndale Line
- Operator(s): Amtrak, SEPTA

Technical
- Line length: 102.9 mi (165.6 km)
- Track length: 105.2 mi (169.3 km)
- Number of tracks: 2-4
- Track gauge: 4 ft 8 1/2 in (1,435 mm) standard gauge
- Electrification: Overhead line, 12 kV 25 Hz AC
- Operating speed: 110 mph (180 km/h)
- Signalling: Cab signalling

The Philadelphia to Harrisburg Main Line is a rail line owned and operated by Amtrak in the U.S. state of Pennsylvania. This is the only electrified Amtrak line in the United States outside of the main line of the Northeast Corridor. The line runs from Philadelphia, where it meets the Northeast Corridor at Zoo Junction at milepost 1.9, west to Harrisburg (MP 104.6), where electrification ends. The Main Line is part of the longer Keystone Corridor, which continues west to Pittsburgh along the Norfolk Southern Railway's Pittsburgh Line. This section is sometimes referred to as "Keystone East" and is part of Amtrak's Keystone Service.

Philadelphia's Broad Street Station was the original start of the line. It was replaced by Suburban Station, the headquarters for the Pennsylvania Railroad, in 1930. Current service patterns dictate that all passenger rail service on the line begins 1 mile (1.6 km) west of Suburban Station at 30th Street Station, Philadelphia's primary commercial rail station.

== History ==
=== 20th century ===
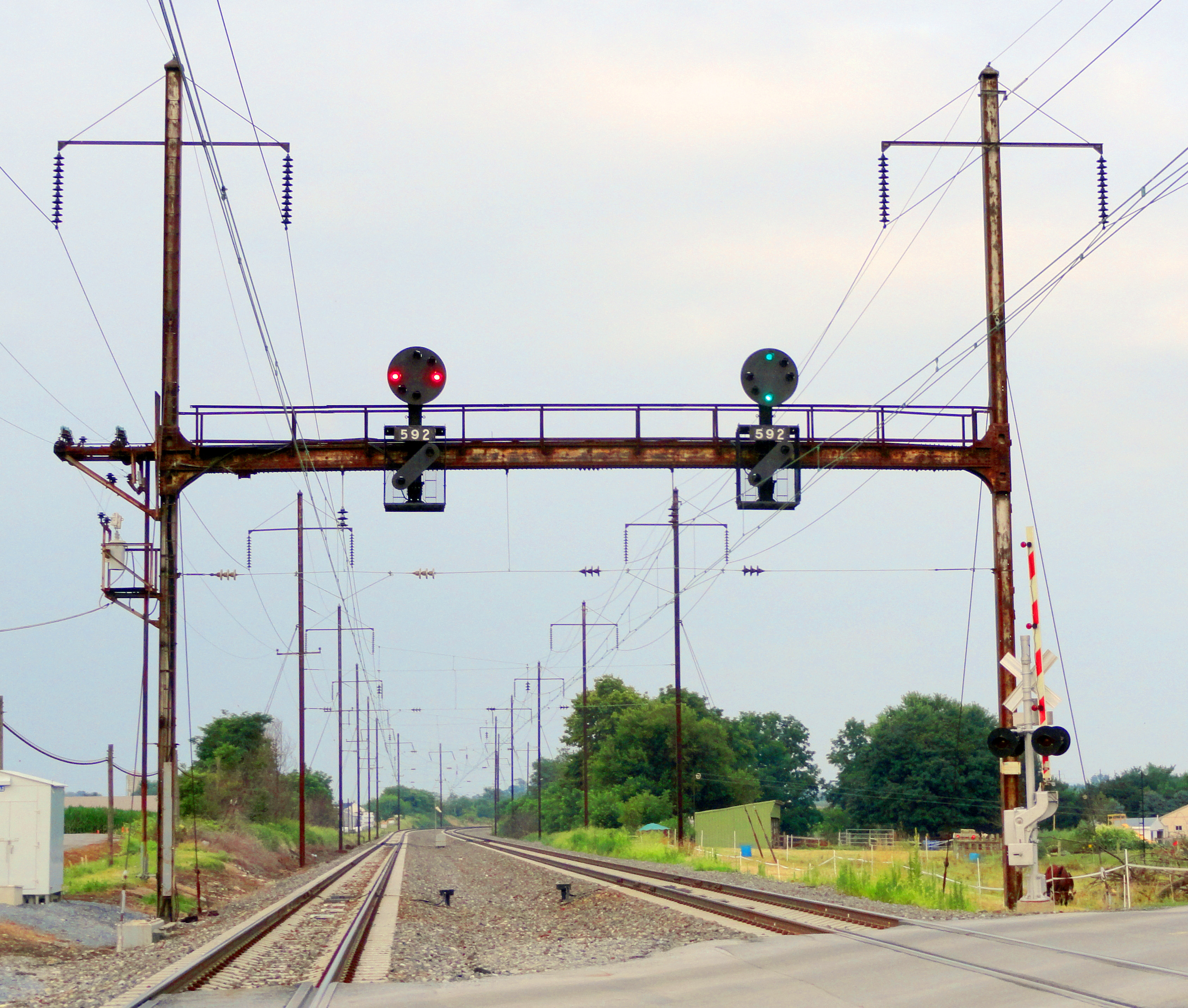
A signal bridge and former grade crossing in Leacock Township, east of Lancaster

The Main Line runs along the route of the former Pennsylvania Main Line and passes through the Philadelphia Main Line, the suburban region for which it is named. The Pennsylvania Railroad originally electrified this line in the 1930s, but it fell into disuse in the 1980s under Amtrak's traction power system.

=== 21st century ===
Amtrak and the Pennsylvania Department of Transportation restored electrical service in October 2006. This allows speeds up to 110 miles per hour.

The line received about $26 million from the 2009 Federal American Reinvestment and Recovery Act that was used to eliminate the last three grade crossings, which is intended to advance the goal of the line reaching 125-mph operations, reduce overall trip times, and improve service reliability. The grade crossings were located in Lancaster County and the last was closed in 2014.

In the 2000s, there was discussion of initiating commuter rail service from Lancaster to Harrisburg, known as the Capital Red Rose Corridor, but the proposal was subsequently abandoned.

Amtrak's Keystone Service and Pennsylvanian operate over the entire line. SEPTA Regional Rail Paoli/Thorndale Line trains operate east of Thorndale, with the rights to continue revenue service west to Parkesburg and to run west to Cork Interlocking just east of Amtrak's Lancaster station to reverse direction.

Freight trackage rights over the whole line are assigned to the Norfolk Southern Railway. The Canadian Pacific Railway also has rights over a small piece near Harrisburg, from the west end to Roy Interlocking in Royalton, to allow CP trains to get from the end of their Sunbury Line or Allentown to Perryville, Maryland.

The Commonwealth of Pennsylvania provides the subsidies for Amtrak for the Keystone Service and Pennsylvanian passenger routes that operate on this line.

== Stations ==
All stations are located in Pennsylvania.

Milepost (km)	Station	Location	Current station opened	Services			Connections
Milepost (km)	Station	Location	Current station opened	P/T	KS	PA	Connections
0.0 mi (0 km)	Suburban Station	Philadelphia	September 28, 1930	●			SEPTA Regional Rail: all lines SEPTA Metro: L, B, T (at 15th Street/City Hall); SEPTA City Bus: 2, 4, 16, 17, 27, 31, 32, 33, 38, 44, 48, 62; SEPTA Suburban Bus: 124, 125
1.0 mi (1.6 km)	30th Street Station	Philadelphia	1933	●	●	●	Amtrak: Acela, Cardinal, Carolinian, Crescent, Northeast Regional, Palmetto, Silver Meteor, Silver Star, Vermonter; SEPTA Regional Rail: all lines NJ Transit Rail: ■ Atlantic City Line; SEPTA Metro: L, T SEPTA City Bus: 9, 12, 21, 30, 31, 42, 44, 49, 62, LUCY; SEPTA Suburban Bus: 124, 125
5.4 mi (8.7 km)	Overbrook	Philadelphia	1860	●			SEPTA City Bus: 63, 65
6.0 mi (9.7 km)	Merion	Lower Merion	1914	●			
6.8 mi (10.9 km)	Narberth	Narberth	September 11, 1915	●			SEPTA City Bus: 44
7.4 mi (11.9 km)	Wynnewood	Wynnewood	1870	●			SEPTA Suburban Bus: 105
8.5 mi (13.7 km)	Ardmore	Ardmore	1870	●	●		SEPTA City Bus: 44; SEPTA Suburban Bus: 103, 105, 106
9.1 mi (14.6 km)	Haverford	Haverford	1880	●			SEPTA Suburban Bus: 105, 106
10.1 mi (16.3 km)	Bryn Mawr	Bryn Mawr	1869	●			SEPTA Suburban Bus: 105, 106
10.9 mi (17.5 km)	Rosemont	Rosemont	1871	●			SEPTA Suburban Bus: 105, 106
12.0 mi (19.3 km)	Villanova	Radnor	1890	●			SEPTA Suburban Bus: 106
13.0 mi (20.9 km)	Radnor	Radnor	1872	●			SEPTA Suburban Bus: 106
13.7 mi (22.0 km)	St. Davids	Radnor	1890	●			SEPTA Suburban Bus: 106
14.5 mi (23.3 km)	Wayne	Radnor	1884	●			SEPTA Suburban Bus: 106
15.4 mi (24.8 km)	Strafford	Tredyffrin	1876	●			
16.4 mi (26.4 km)	Devon	Easttown	1890	●			SEPTA Suburban Bus: 106
17.5 mi (28.2 km)	Berwyn	Easttown	1884	●			SEPTA Suburban Bus: 106
18.6 mi (29.9 km)	Daylesford	Tredyffrin		●			SEPTA Suburban Bus: 106
19.9 mi (32.0 km)	Paoli	Paoli	1893	●	●	●	SEPTA Suburban Bus: 92, 106, 204, 206
21.6 mi (34.8 km)	Malvern	Malvern	1900	●			SEPTA Suburban Bus: 92
27.5 mi (44.3 km)	Exton	Exton	1981	●	●	EB	SEPTA Suburban Bus: 135; WCU Shuttle
28.3 mi (45.5 km)	Whitford	Exton	1880	●			
32.4 mi (52.1 km)	Downingtown	Downingtown		●	●		SEPTA Suburban Bus: 135
35.5 mi (57.1 km)	Thorndale	Thorndale	November 22, 1999	●			SEPTA Suburban Bus: 135
38.4 mi (61.8 km)	Coatesville	Coatesville	1868		●		SEPTA Suburban Bus: 135; TMACC: Coatesville Link
44.2 mi (71.1 km)	Parkesburg	Parkesburg	1905		●		TMACC: Coatesville Link
68.0 mi (109.4 km)	Lancaster	Lancaster	1929		●	●	Red Rose Transit Authority: 1, 6, 10, 11, 19
80.1 mi (128.9 km)	Mount Joy	Mount Joy			●		Red Rose Transit Authority: 18
86.8 mi (139.7 km)	Elizabethtown	Elizabethtown	1915		●	●	Red Rose Transit Authority: 18
94.7 mi (152.4 km)	Middletown	Middletown	1990		●		CAT: 7
104.6 mi (168.3 km)	Harrisburg Transportation Center	Harrisburg	1887		●	●	CAT, Lebanon Transit, rabbittransit Fullington Trailways; Greyhound Lines
