= Radnor station (SEPTA Regional Rail) =

SEPTA Regional Rail station in Radnor Township, Pennsylvania

Radnor
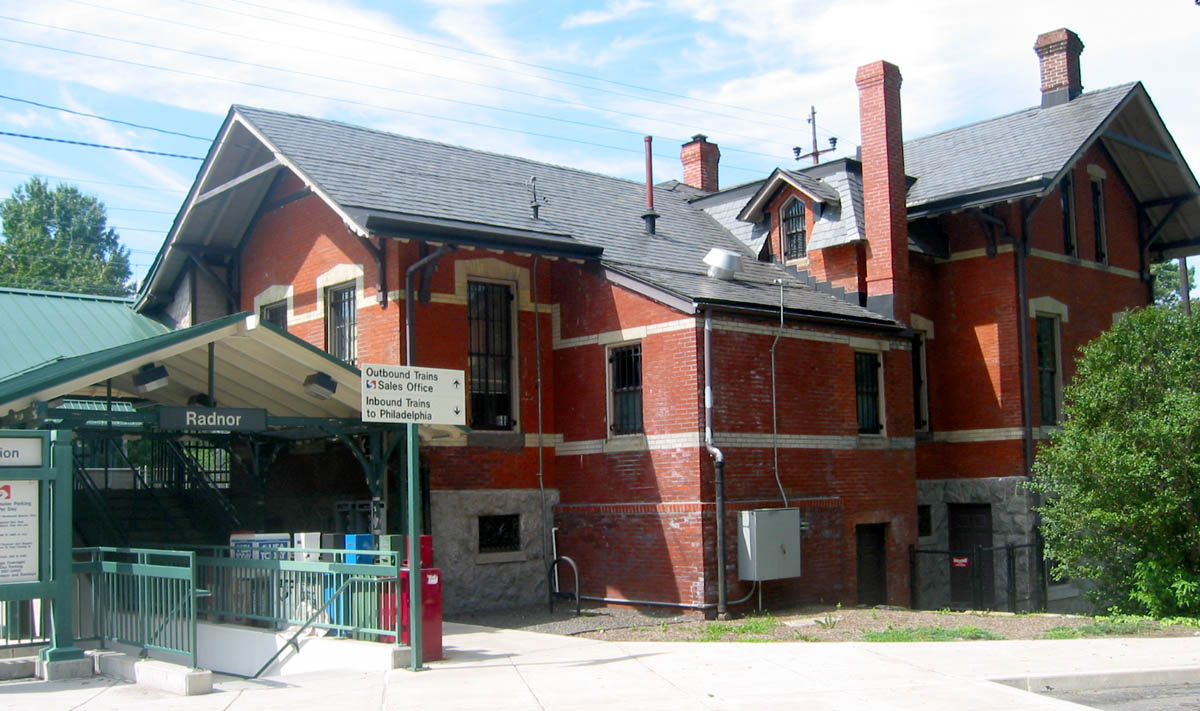
- Radnor station in July 2005

General information
- Location: 291 King of Prussia Road; Radnor, Pennsylvania; United States
- Coordinates: 40.0449°N 75.3595°W
- Owner: Amtrak
- Operator: SEPTA
- Line: Amtrak Philadelphia to Harrisburg Main Line (Keystone Corridor)
- Platforms: 2 side platforms
- Tracks: 4
- Connections: SEPTA Suburban Bus: 105

Construction
- Parking: 220 spaces (95 daily, 46 permit, 79 municipal meters)
- Cycle facilities: 2 racks (4 spaces)
- Accessible: yes

Other information
- Fare zone: 3

History
- Opened: 1872
- Rebuilt: 1999–2002
- Electrified: September 11, 1915

Passengers
- 2017: 586 boardings 749 alightings (weekday average)
- Rank: 41 of 146

Services
Preceding station	SEPTA	Following station
St. Davids toward Thorndale	Paoli/Thorndale Line	Villanova toward Temple University
Former services
Preceding station	Amtrak	Following station
Wayne toward Harrisburg	Keystone Service Until 1983	Bryn Mawr toward Philadelphia–Suburban
Preceding station	Pennsylvania Railroad	Following station
St. Davids toward Paoli	Paoli Line	Upton toward Suburban Station
Location

Radnor station is a SEPTA Regional Rail station in Radnor, Pennsylvania. It is served by most Paoli/Thorndale Line trains. Radnor has two low-level side platforms with pathways connecting the platforms to the inner tracks.

== History ==
The Radnor station was originally built in 1872. It was a replacement for the former Morgan's Corner Station built by the Philadelphia and Columbia Railroad. The station was designed by Joseph M. Wilson and Frederick G. Thorn, both later of Wilson Brothers & Company, architects. Radnor's design was a brick variant of Wynnewood station, with a two-story agent's residence addition. A nearly identical version of Radnor Station was built by the Pennsylvania Railroad at Hawkins, just east of Pittsburgh.

After electrification, in 1917 a synchronous compensator for delivering reactive power was installed (see Amtrak's 25 Hz traction power system). This device was later removed. Between 1999 and 2002, SEPTA restored and renovated the historic station building. The station building was restored, its historic eastbound shelter replaced with a modern structure, and new platforms, ramps, lighting, and signage were installed.
