= Wayne station =

Railway station in Wayne, Pennsylvania

Wayne
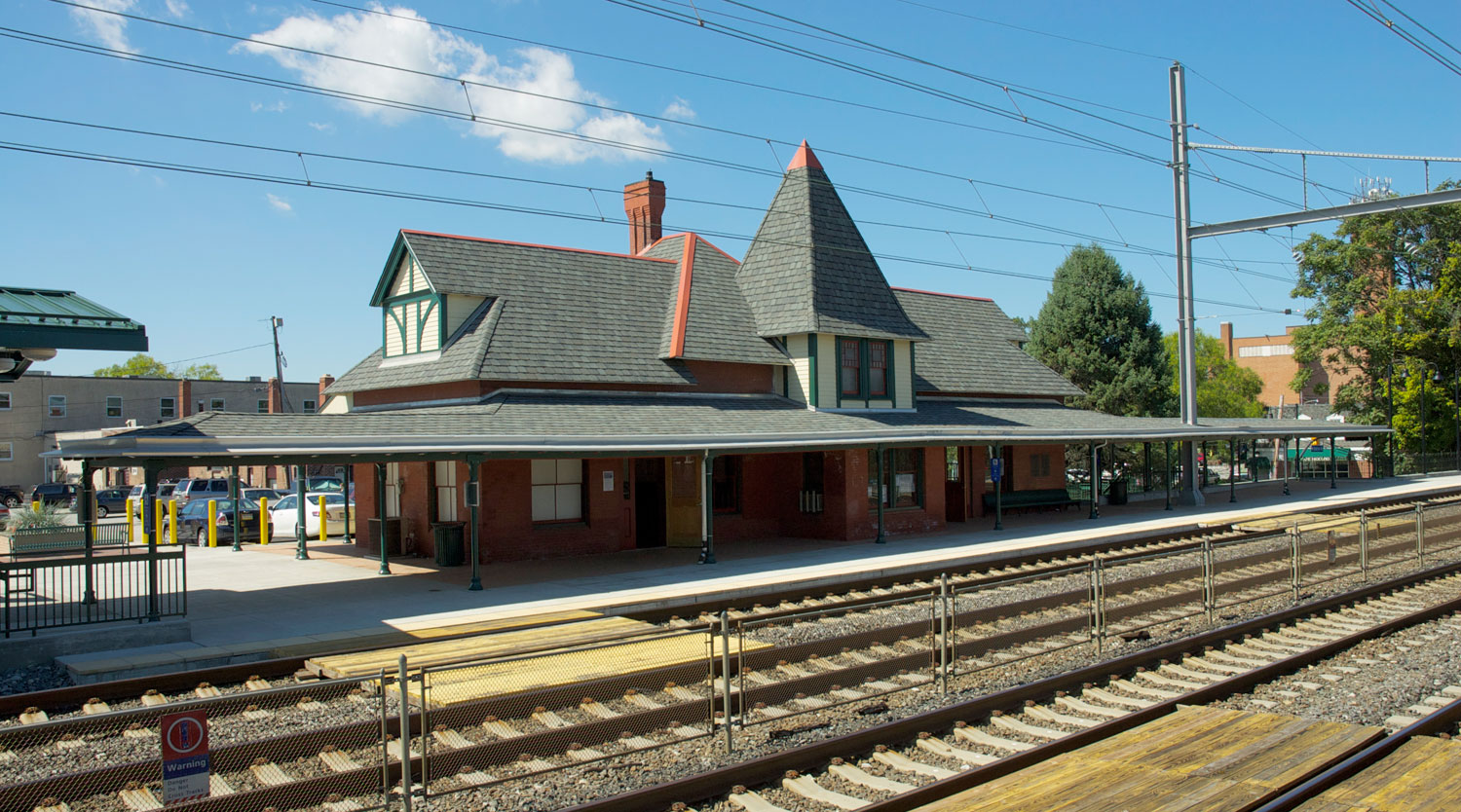
- Wayne station in August 2010

General information
- Location: 145 North Wayne Avenue; Wayne, Pennsylvania; United States
- Coordinates: 40.0457°N 75.3872°W
- Owner: Amtrak
- Operator: SEPTA
- Line: Amtrak Philadelphia to Harrisburg Main Line (Keystone Corridor)
- Platforms: 2 side platforms
- Tracks: 4
- Connections: SEPTA Suburban Bus: 105

Construction
- Parking: 225 spaces (61 daily, 103 permit, 61 long-term meters)
- Cycle facilities: 7 racks (14 bicycles)
- Accessible: Yes
- Architect: W. Bleddyn Powell
- Architectural style: Stick/Eastlake, Queen Anne

Other information
- Fare zone: 3

History
- Opened: 1882–1884
- Electrified: September 11, 1915

Passengers
- 2017: 526 boardings 571 alightings (weekday average)
- Rank: 46 of 146

Services
Preceding station	SEPTA	Following station
Strafford toward Thorndale	Paoli/Thorndale Line	St. Davids toward Temple University
Former services
Preceding station	Amtrak	Following station
Paoli toward Harrisburg	Keystone Service Before 1988	Radnor toward Philadelphia–Suburban
Preceding station	Pennsylvania Railroad	Following station
Berwyn toward Chicago	Main Line	St. Davids toward New York or Exchange Place
Strafford toward Paoli	Paoli Line	St. Davids toward Suburban Station
- Pennsylvania Railroad Station at Wayne
- U.S. National Register of Historic Places
- NRHP reference No.: 99000674
- Added to NRHP: 1999
Location

Wayne station is a SEPTA Regional Rail station located in the western suburbs of Philadelphia in Wayne, Delaware County, Pennsylvania. It is served by most Paoli/Thorndale Line trains. It is in Radnor Township.

Wayne has two partially high-level side platforms with pathways connecting the platforms to the inner tracks.

== History ==
The Wayne station was built by the Pennsylvania Railroad from 1882 to 1884, on a design by Washington Bleddyn Powell. The original builder was William H. Bilyeu. It consists of two Victorian buildings flanking the rail lines and connected by a tunnel. The station building was restored from 1998 to 2010 with significant local community support and funding. The year after this restoration project began, the station was listed on the National Register of Historic Places. The restoration included repair or replacement of the chimney, masonry, windows, doors, and the retaining wall.

SEPTA began a $22.7 million second phase of improvements that replaced the roof, repaired masonry and structural members, and made other upgrades to the station building. The outbound shelter, dating from about 1890, was rebuilt, mostly with new materials. Also installed were accessible-mandated improvements including new high-level platforms, stairs and ramps to the platforms, building modifications, lighting, handrails, and signage. The new platforms, on both the inbound and outbound sides east of the station building, meant that trains no longer stop in front of the station itself, except in special cases.
