= Bryn Mawr station (SEPTA Regional Rail) =

SEPTA Regional Rail station in Bryn Mawr, Pennsylvania

Bryn Mawr
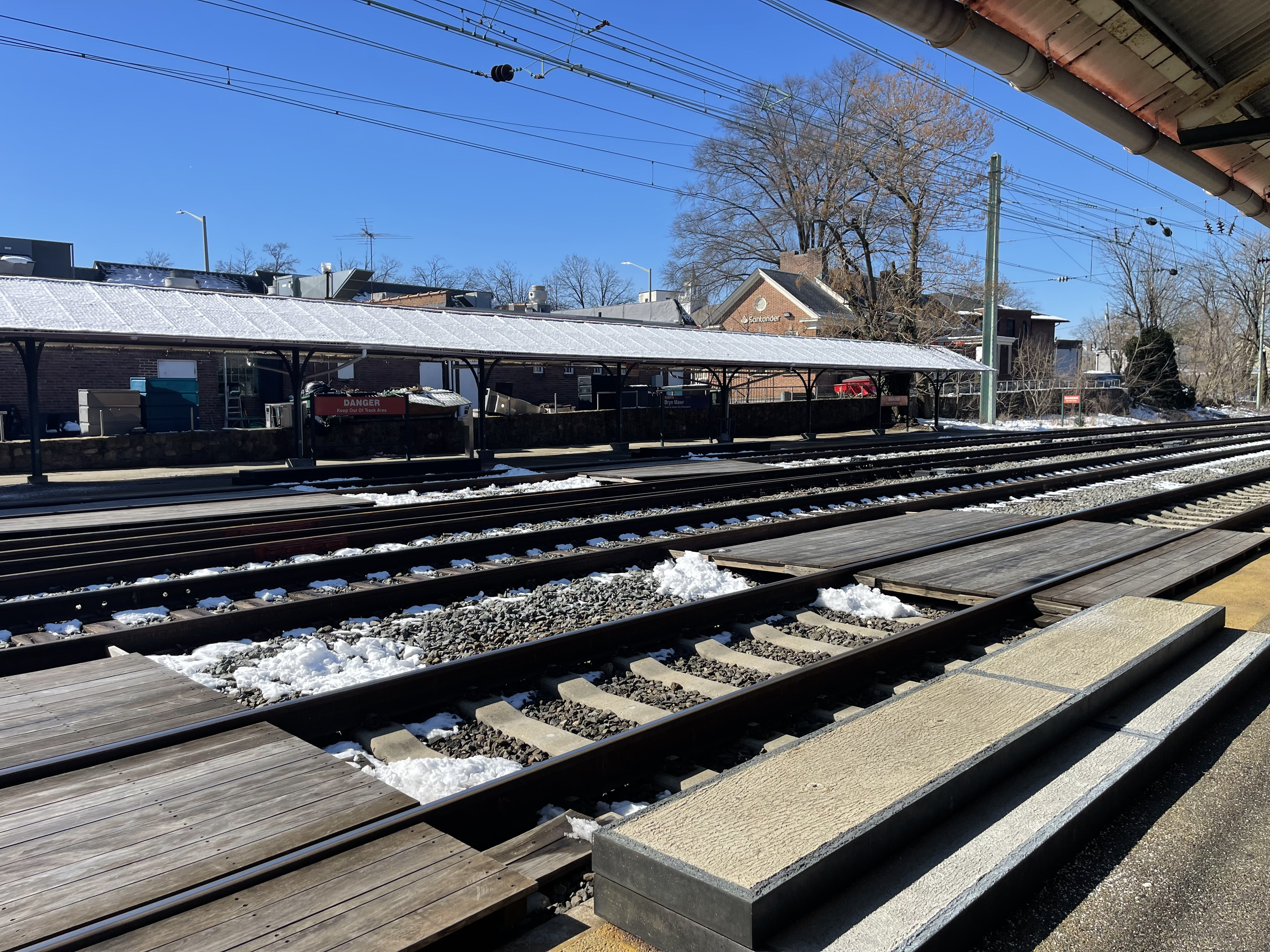

General information
- Location: 54 North Bryn Mawr Avenue; Bryn Mawr, Pennsylvania; United States
- Coordinates: 40°01′19″N 75°18′57″W
- Owner: Amtrak
- Operator: SEPTA
- Line: Amtrak Philadelphia to Harrisburg Main Line (Keystone Corridor)
- Platforms: 2 side platforms
- Tracks: 4
- Connections: SEPTA Suburban Bus: 105

Construction
- Parking: 254 spaces (45 daily, 153 permit, 55 municipal meters)
- Cycle facilities: 9 racks (24 spaces)
- Accessible: No

Other information
- Fare zone: 3

History
- Opened: 1869
- Rebuilt: 1963
- Electrified: September 11, 1915

Passengers
- 2017: 937 boardings 930 alightings (weekday average)
- Rank: 18 of 146

Services
Preceding station	SEPTA	Following station
Rosemont toward Thorndale	Paoli/Thorndale Line	Haverford toward Temple University
Former services
Preceding station	Amtrak	Following station
Radnor toward Harrisburg	Keystone Service Before 1988	Ardmore toward Philadelphia–Suburban
Preceding station	Pennsylvania Railroad	Following station
St. Davids toward Chicago	Main Line	Haverford toward New York or Exchange Place
Rosemont toward Paoli	Paoli Line	Haverford toward Suburban Station
Location

Bryn Mawr station is a SEPTA Regional Rail station in Bryn Mawr, Pennsylvania. It is located in the western suburbs of Philadelphia at Morris and Bryn Mawr Avenues. It is served by most Paoli/Thorndale Line trains with the exception of a few "limited" and express trains.

The ticket office at this station is open weekdays 6:05 a.m. to 6:05 p.m. excluding holidays. There are 254 parking spaces at the station. This station is in fare zone 3 and is 10.1 track miles from Suburban Station. In 2017, the average total weekday boardings at this station was 937 and the average total weekday alightings was 930.

== History ==
The first station at this location, alternatively known as Whitehall, was built in 1859 and located further east in a building now occupied by the Bryn Mawr Hospital thrift shop. The Pennsylvania Railroad straightened this portion of the route in 1869 and moved to a new station designed by Joseph M. Wilson. That station was demolished in 1963 and replaced by a mid-20th century mock-colonial style structure. The former freight house on the south side of the tracks, which dates to 1870, is currently a local restaurant.

The interlocking tower was placed in service on August 11, 1895, but suffered a fire in 1994 and its duties were transferred to Paoli Tower.

The original substation constructed by the Pennsylvania Railroad in 1913–1915 at the station was part of a project to electrify the line between Broad Street Station in Philadelphia and Paoli Station and was the first catenary electrification project done by the Pennsylvania Railroad. The substation has since been relegated to switching duties. It was proposed in 2013 that this substation be replaced as part of a larger project, but that was rejected by local government.

A train crash occurred at the station on May 18, 1951, injuring 63 and killing 8. There is also an interlocking tower and an interlocking at this station.

== Station layout ==
Bryn Mawr has two low-level side platforms with pathways connecting the platforms to the inner tracks. It also contains a tunnel below the tracks connecting the two platforms.

== Image gallery ==
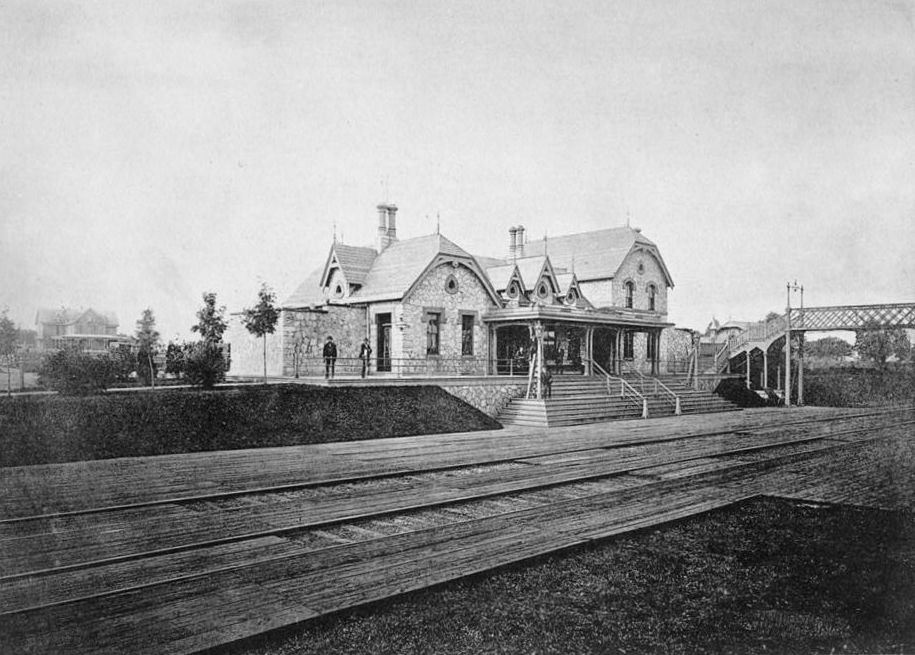
The original Gothic revival station, circa 1870, demolished in 1963.

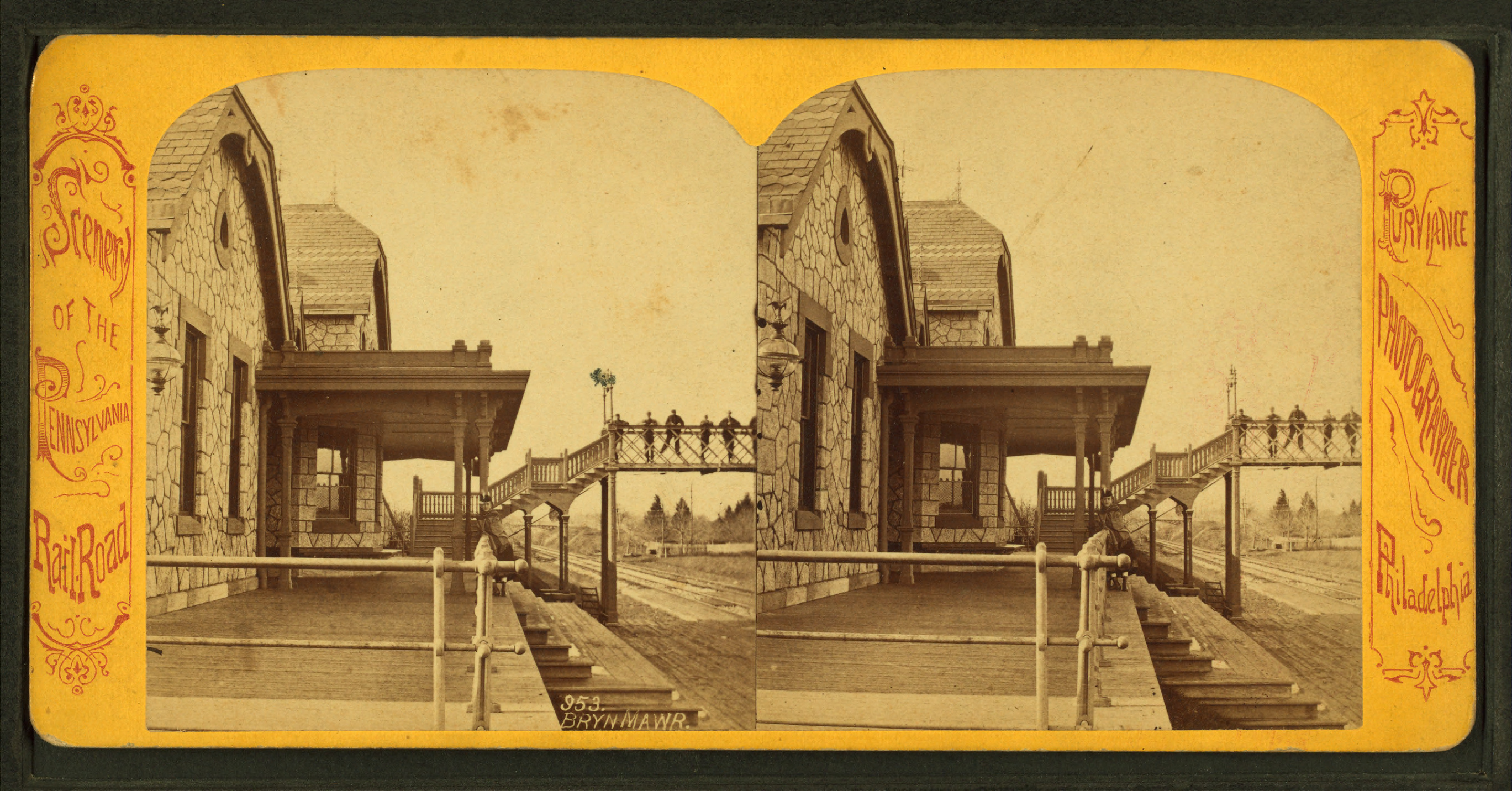
Stereoscopic view from the 1870s. Robert N. Dennis Collection, New York Public Library.

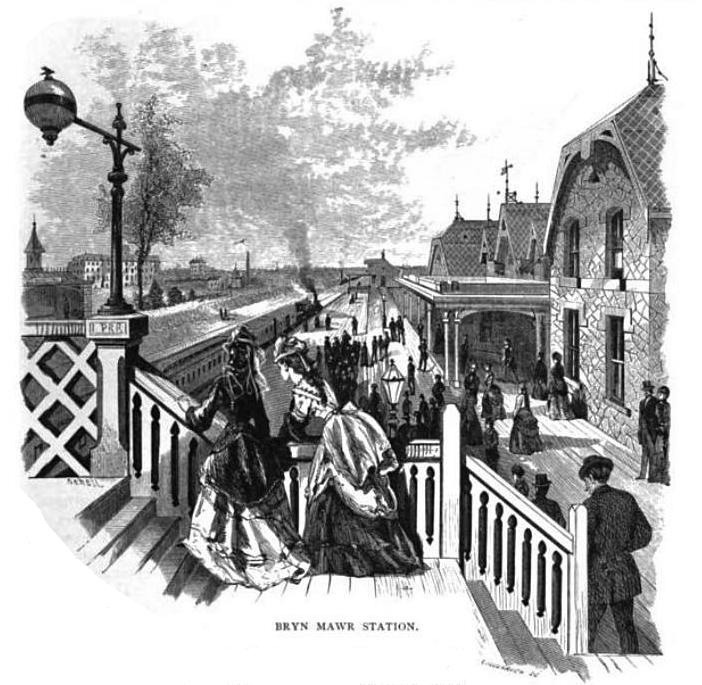
Bryn Mawr station as it appeared c. 1875.

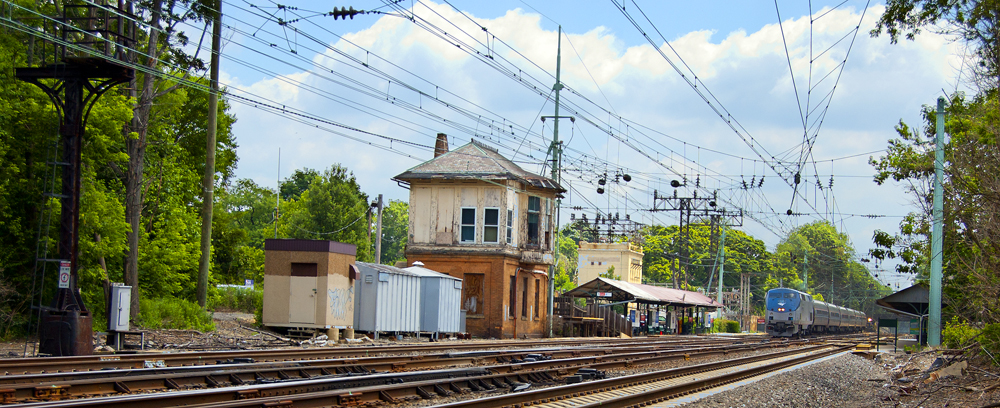
Panoramic view of Bryn Mawr station looking east with 1895 Interlocking Control Tower as Amtrak's daily westbound run of its New York to Pittsburgh Pennsylvanian passes on Track 3.

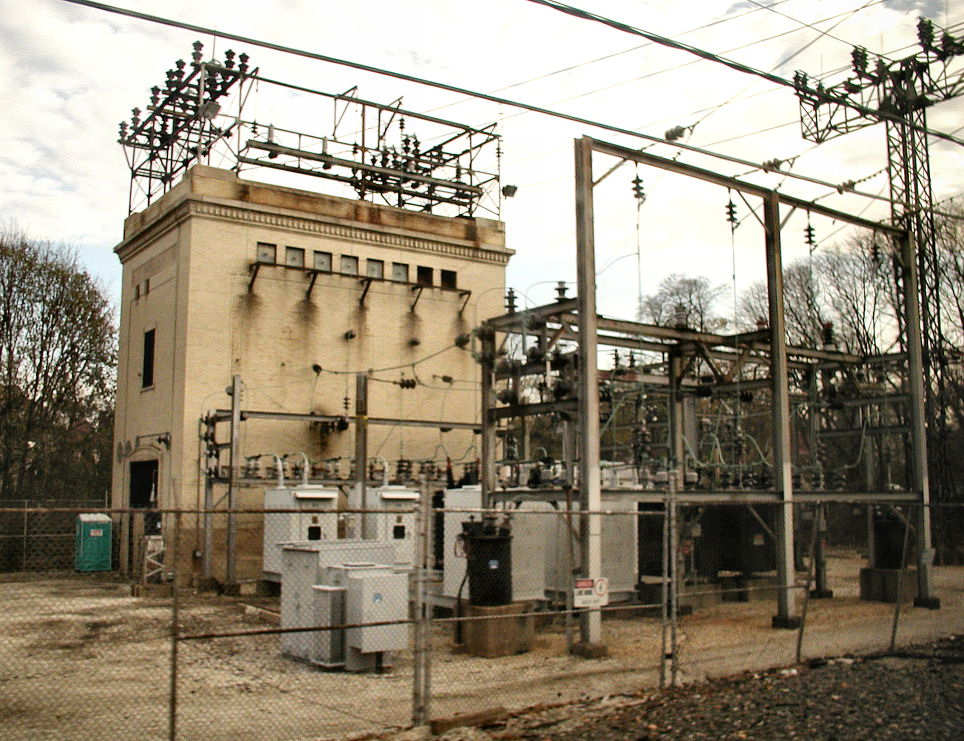
Old substation built for the 1915 electrification project at Bryn Mawr, Pennsylvania. Outdoor yard is an addition.
