= Keystone Corridor =

Rail corridor in Pennsylvania

Coordinates: 40.2858°N 76.8617°W

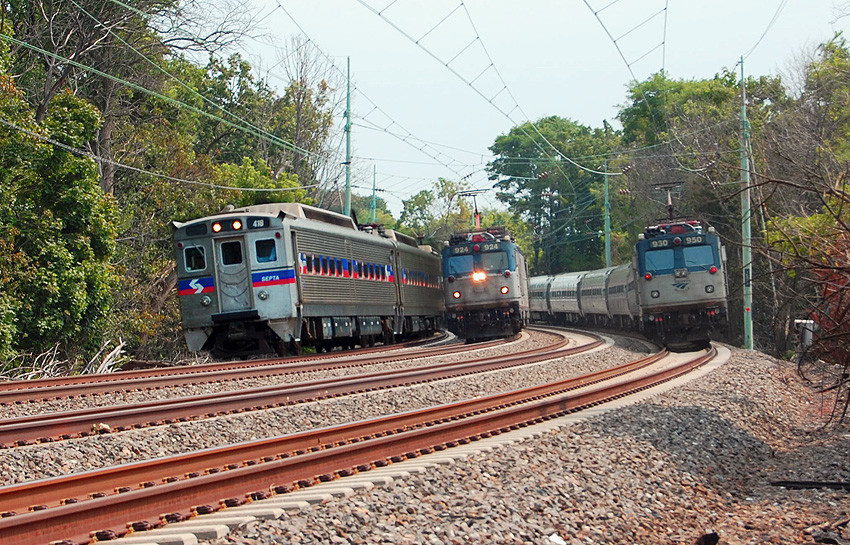
- The Keystone Corridor in Rosemont, Pennsylvania

Overview
- Status: Operating
- Owner: SEPTA (Suburban Station–30th Street Station); Amtrak (30th Street Station–Harrisburg); Norfolk Southern (Harrisburg–Pittsburgh)
- Locale: Pennsylvania, U.S.
- Termini: Philadelphia Suburban Station; Pittsburgh Union Station
- Stations: 39 (15 Amtrak, 19 SEPTA, 5 shared)

Service
- Type: Higher-speed rail, commuter rail, inter-city rail
- Services: Amtrak Keystone Service; Amtrak Pennsylvanian; SEPTA Paoli/Thorndale Line

History
- Opened: 1915

Technical
- Line length: 349 miles (562 km)
- Track gauge: 4 ft 8 1/2 in (1,435 mm) standard gauge
- Electrification: Overhead line, 12 kV 25 Hz AC (east of Harrisburg)
- Operating speed: 110 mph (180 km/h) (top)

The Keystone Corridor is a 349-mile (562 km) railroad corridor between Philadelphia and Pittsburgh, Pennsylvania, that consists of two rail lines: Amtrak and SEPTA's Philadelphia-to-Harrisburg main line, which hosts SEPTA's Paoli/Thorndale Line commuter rail service, and Amtrak's Keystone Service and Pennsylvanian inter-city trains; and the Norfolk Southern Pittsburgh Line. The corridor was originally the Main Line of the Pennsylvania Railroad.

Amtrak runs two intercity rail services along the Keystone Corridor: the Harrisburg-to-New York City Keystone Service and the Pittsburgh-to-New York City Pennsylvanian. SEPTA operates daily Paoli/Thorndale commuter rail service between Philadelphia and Thorndale on the Philadelphia-to-Harrisburg main line. The towns along this stretch form a socio-cultural region called the "Philadelphia Main Line".

The tracks from Pittsburgh to Harrisburg are owned and maintained by Norfolk Southern, which acquired them from Conrail. They include the Horseshoe Curve west of Altoona. The tracks between Harrisburg and Philadelphia are owned and maintained by Amtrak, and are the only part of the Keystone Corridor that is electrified. The tracks join the Northeast Corridor at Zoo Interlocking near the Philadelphia Zoo and 30th Street Station.

== History ==
The right-of-way that would become the Keystone Corridor was mainly laid by two railroads. The tracks east of Dillerville, just west of Lancaster, were originally the Philadelphia and Columbia Railroad, part of the state-owned Main Line of Public Works. From Lancaster west to Harrisburg, the tracks were laid by the Harrisburg, Portsmouth, Mount Joy and Lancaster Railroad. Except for minor realignments, today's Keystone Corridor runs along the same path.

Both lines eventually became part of the Pennsylvania Railroad's (PRR) main line.

In 1915, the PRR electrified the line from Philadelphia's Broad Street Station to Paoli, then the west end of commuter service. Electrification west of Paoli to Harrisburg came in the 1930s, after the PRR completed electrifying its New York-Washington, D.C. section (the present-day Northeast Corridor). The total cost of electrification topped $200 million, which was financed by government-supported loans from the Reconstruction Finance Corporation and the Public Works Administration.

Passenger service remained unprofitable, returned to profitability during World War II, and then slumped again. The PRR overhauled much of the right-of-way in the 1950s, but chose to keep paying a stable dividend rather than reinvest in infrastructure. The result was dilapidated stations, slow, disjointed track conditions, and antiquated rolling stock which frequently broke down.

In 1968, the PRR merged with the New York Central to become Penn Central, which declared bankruptcy in 1970. In 1976, Amtrak took ownership of the line between Philadelphia and Harrisburg while Conrail (the merger of Penn Central, the Reading Company, and several other Class I railroads) took ownership of the remaining part of the line and the many branches, both electrified and non-electrified, that the Penn Central had owned. Amtrak took over the express Harrisburg-New York intercity rail service in 1971, while Conrail, under SEPTA auspices, continued Harrisburg-Philadelphia commuter services. In 1983, SEPTA took over all commuter services and extended operations to Parkesburg (later truncated in 1996 to Downingtown, but later extended to Thorndale).

Penn Central made an agreement with the federal government to provide a high-speed service called the Metroliner, which upgraded the Northeast Corridor tracks between New York and Washington by 1969, but neglected other areas such as the Keystone Corridor, a lack of maintenance that continued after Amtrak's takeover in 1976. The Keystone Corridor eventually served as a "depository" for the problem-prone Metroliner electric multiple unit cars. Amtrak also used electric locomotive-hauled trains for Harrisburg-New York service. Before the introduction of Acela electric high-speed service over the Northeast Corridor, and after facing a shortage of electric locomotives (both E60 and AEM-7 models), Amtrak used GE Genesis diesel locomotives between Harrisburg and Philadelphia, with an engine change to an electric (usually AEM-7) locomotive at 30th Street Station. Due to the slower schedules combined with higher ticket prices and competition from SEPTA, ridership declined.

The line between Philadelphia and Lancaster was four tracks until the 1960s, when the PRR removed two of the tracks west of Paoli. The line is now two tracks from Paoli to Harrisburg, save for a three-track section between the Glen and Park interlockings, and a four-track section between the Downs and Thorn interlockings.

As of 2004, most of the track was limited to a maximum speed of 70 miles per hour (110 km/h), except for a few 90 miles per hour (140 km/h) sections between Downingtown and Lancaster. There are also curves which require slower speeds (especially in the section between Merion and Overbrook), and speed restrictions within interlocking limits.

=== High-speed corridor ===
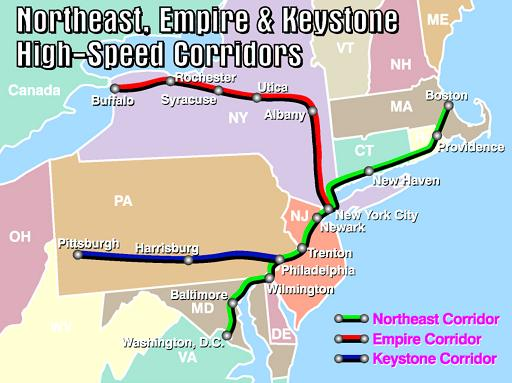
Keystone Corridor (blue), as designated by the Federal Railroad Administration

In 1999, the Keystone Corridor was formally recognized as a "designated high speed corridor" by the Federal Railroad Administration (FRA), as part of the TEA-21 transportation bill. The Commonwealth of Pennsylvania will fund half of the project's costs, and Amtrak will fund the other half.

The goals of this project include:

- 90-minute travel time between Harrisburg and Philadelphia on express trains
- 105-minute travel time on normal trains
- Raising track speed to 110 miles per hour (180 km/h) where possible
- Increasing the number of daily round trips from 11 to 14
- Replacing diesel trains with electric on Keystone Service

A summary appears in an FRA report.

Construction on the USD $145 million project began on March 7, 2005, and was completed in Fall, 2006. Amtrak's press releases have summarized the improvements as:

- Installation of 80 track miles (128 km) of new concrete ties
- Installation of more than 40 new track switches
- A new signal system between Lancaster and Harrisburg
- Upgrade of 16 existing bridges and culverts
- Upgrade of overhead electrical wires (catenary)
- Upgrade of electrical substations to support use of electric locomotives.

The installation of concrete ties also included replacement of the old jointed rail with new continuous welded rail (136 RE), track surfacing, and alignment. Track surfacing is adjusting the vertical profile of the two rails, leveling the rails on straight track and introducing superelevation (banking) in curves. The 80 miles (130 km) are broken down as:

- 25 miles (40 km) on track 4 from Park (Parkesburg) to Cork (Lancaster) interlockings
- 25 miles (40 km) on track 1 from Cork (Lancaster) to Park (Parkesburg) interlockings
- 15 miles (24 km) on track 3 from Paoli to Overbrook
- 15 miles (24 km) on track 2 from Overbrook to Paoli

Amtrak replaced the signal and communications system and rebuilt the overhead catenary wire and upgraded electrical substations to provide the power needed to operate several electric trains simultaneously on this line. Since October 2006, Amtrak, having sufficient Acela high-speed trainsets, started using electric push-pull trainsets for the first time since the mid-1990s. Using AEM7 locomotives and former Metroliner m.u. coaches modified into a push-pull cab-coach (with the locomotive "pulling" westbound trains and "pushing" eastbound), the electrified service is currently used on the Harrisburg-New York Keystone Service, while the Genesis diesel locomotives are still used for the Pittsburgh-New York Pennsylvanian service. As on the Northeast Corridor, Amtrak trains between Paoli and Overbrook use the high-speed inner rails for normal operations.

In March 2011, Pennsylvania received a $750,000 grant from the High-Speed Intercity Passenger Rail Program to investigate extending high-speed electrified service from Harrisburg to Pittsburgh.

At-grade crossings with roads between Philadelphia and Harrisburg remained until 2014. One of the crossings was in Elizabethtown and another in Mount Joy. The third, between Mount Joy and Lancaster, was blocked off using fencing and jersey barriers. Additional funding from the American Recovery and Reinvestment Act of 2009 was used to complete the elimination of all at-grade crossings. The last was closed in 2014. Private crossings remain between Philadelphia and Harrisburg. There are still grade crossings between Harrisburg and Pittsburgh.

=== Earlier studies ===
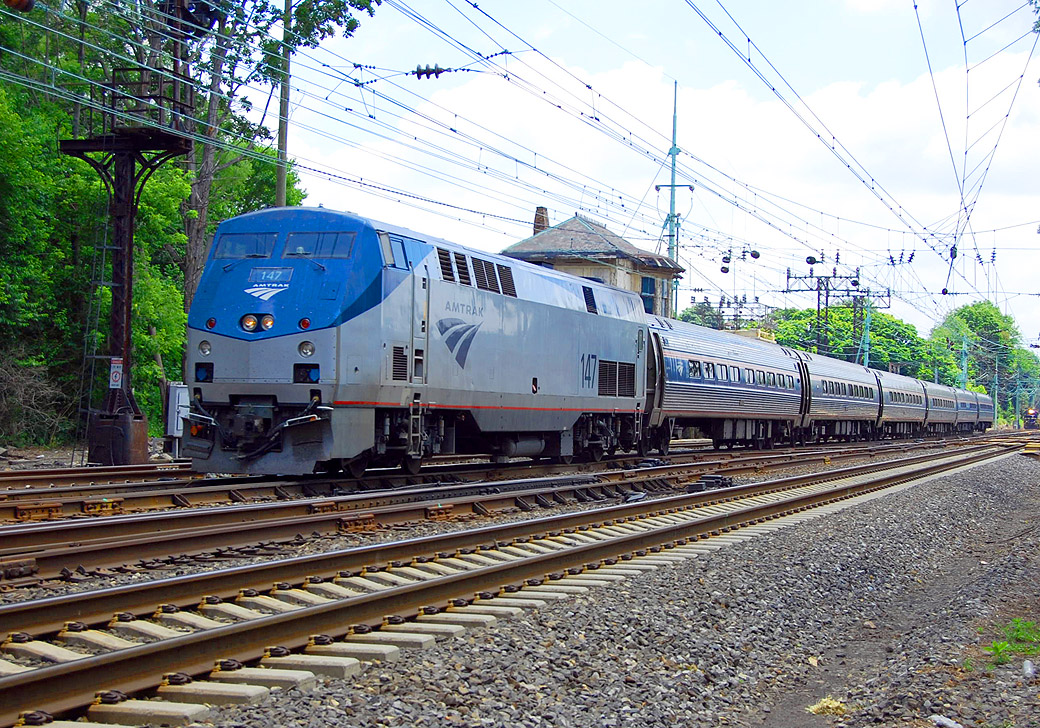
Pennsylvanian passing Bryn Mawr, Pennsylvania

There have been earlier studies by the USDOT and FRA of the Keystone Corridor, and these studies contain proposals or speculations which might not be in the currently funded projects. Some of these ideas are below.

Amtrak service to Suburban Station, which is in Center City Philadelphia, ended in 1988. An early study says that PennDOT used Suburban Station as the Philadelphia endpoint for the 90-minute service to Harrisburg. Restoring service to Suburban Station may increase ridership but would require using the upper level of 30th Street Station and either scheduling trains to turn at Suburban Station or to continue through the Center City Commuter Tunnel with Amtrak trains turning around at Wayne Junction.

Bypassing 30th Street Station by using the New York-Pittsburgh Subway would allow trains to skip a time-consuming stop and reverse of directions at 30th Street Station and allow fast service between New York and Harrisburg. Historically, the PRR fast trains going to NY from the west would bypass 30th Street Station, and passengers for Philadelphia would change trains at North Philadelphia. One study suggested two daily electric-train round-trips between New York and Harrisburg with stops in North Philadelphia and Ardmore, a routing last used by Keystone trains in 1994.

Track reconfiguration between Zoo and Overbrook interlockings can increase track speeds which are usually 30 miles per hour (48 km/h) due to the need to take diverging routes through switches. Reducing the number of diverging moves and the use of 45 miles per hour (72 km/h) switches can increase speeds. Also, the reconfiguration can allow for the removal of the overhead bridge that the R6 Cynwyd trains use. Some other interlockings may be removed or reconfigured. With the reconfiguration near Zoo, the Overbrook interlocking can be removed and replaced with 4 through tracks. Bryn Mawr interlocking may have storage tracks added west of the station to allow R5 Bryn Mawr locals to turn without occupying an express track. Paoli interlocking may be removed if the four-track configuration were to continue west of the station. Paoli station may be reconfigured with high-level island platforms serving all four tracks, as part of a new Paoli transportation center. Frazer interlocking may be reconfigured for turning SEPTA trains and as the point where four tracks become two.

Electrification may be converted to use commercial 60 Hz AC power instead of the special 25 Hz single-phase AC currently in use, although this is doubtful due to the costs involved, lack of real benefits and dedicated 25 Hz hydro-electric capacity at the Safe Harbor Dam. The Safe Harbor Dam also generates electricity for the Northeast Corridor itself, the power going from the dam to the NEC (at Perryville, Maryland), via a 50-mile-long (80 km) pylon network. Between Paoli and 30th Street Station, most of the overhead electric wire and other electrification system components date back to the original 1915 electrification, although the 1915 substations have been retired. West of Paoli the electrification dates from the late 1930s, and west of Downingtown the system is still controlled by the original 1939 power dispatching office in Harrisburg, utilizing electromechanical systems.

=== Construction progress ===
The four-track section between Overbrook and Paoli is numbered sequentially from the southernmost track (number 1 track) to the northernmost track (number 4 track).

Between March 7 and June 27, 2005, Amtrak worked on the number 4 track between Lancaster and Parkesburg, and from June 27 to September 2, 2005, they worked on number 1 track. A work gang with a track laying system (TLS) installed concrete crossties, new continuous welded rail, and new ballast, allowing for 110 miles per hour (180 km/h). The track layout at Lancaster station was simplified so that trains no longer have to take a diverging route to access the station platforms. Because tracks 2 and 3 have been removed, tracks 1 and 4 are the only tracks in this section.

Between October 3, 2005, and mid-December, Amtrak worked on the number 2 track from Paoli to a point between Narberth and Merion stations. On March 20, 2006, Amtrak started working on the number 3 track, starting within Paoli interlocking and working east towards Overbrook. As of April 6, 2006, a track laying system (TLS) has completed work to approximately milepost 16.7. 110-mph service started on October 30, 2006, following completion of a $145 million upgrade of the 104-mile line. Push-pull express trains will cut journey time from the current two hours to 90 minutes. Local service will improve to 105 minutes. Three weekday and two weekend roundtrips will be added as well.

== Services ==
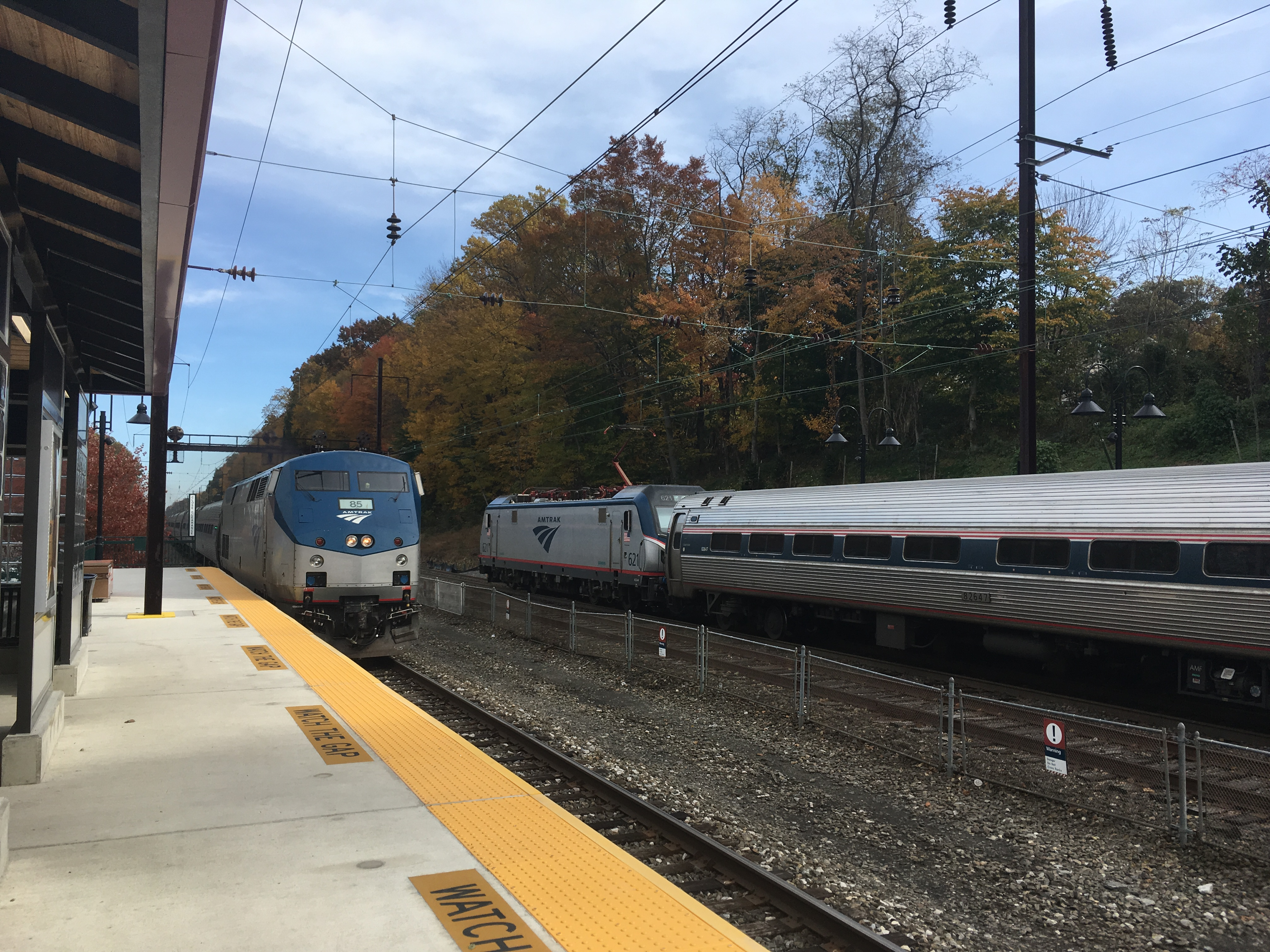
A westbound Pennsylvanian and an eastbound Keystone Service meet in Exton, Pennsylvania.

The busiest part of the Keystone Corridor is the segment between Harrisburg and New York City, which sees multiple trains per day.

=== Amtrak ===
The following Amtrak rail lines serve Keystone Corridor stations:

- Floridian – to/from Chicago and Miami stops at Pittsburgh, the westernmost stop on the Pennsylvanian route.
- Keystone Service – local service along the Northeast Corridor between New York and Philadelphia, and along the Keystone Corridor between Philadelphia and Harrisburg. Timings vary by day of the week in each direction, and some trains to/from Harrisburg terminate at and start from Philadelphia.
- Pennsylvanian – between Pittsburgh and Philadelphia along the Keystone Corridor and between Philadelphia and New York on the Northeast Corridor.

=== Commuter rail ===
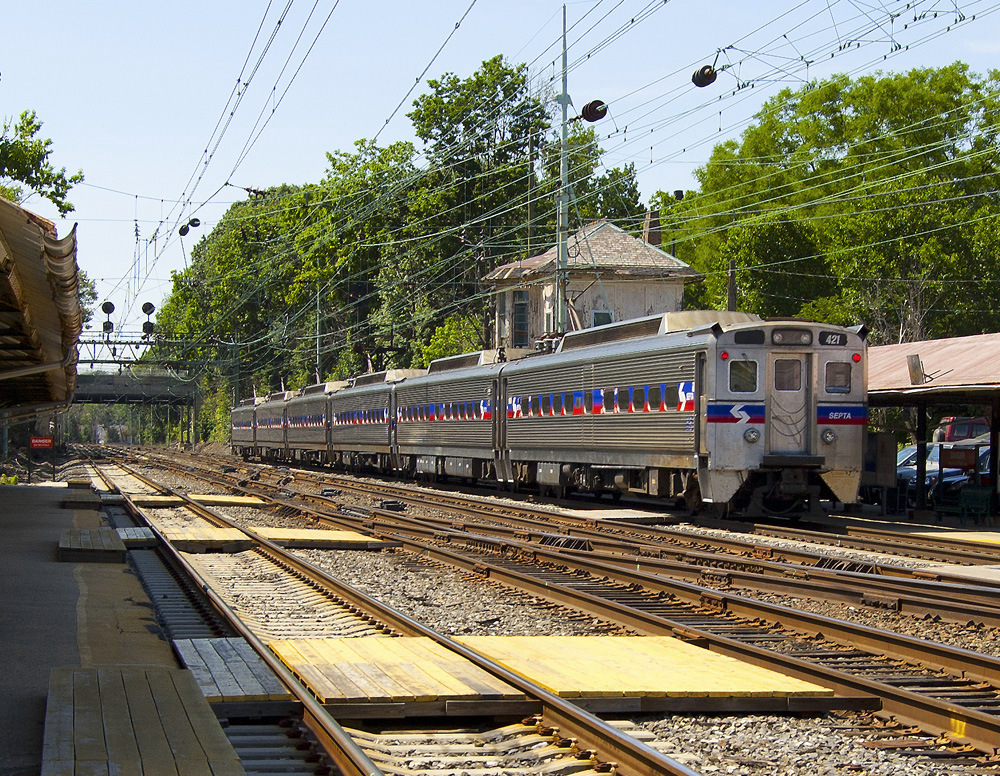
A westbound SEPTA Paoli/Thorndale Line train departing from the Bryn Mawr station

SEPTA Regional Rail operates commuter rail service on the Keystone Corridor between 30th Street Station and Thorndale as the Paoli/Thorndale Line service. Efforts to re-extend the line to Parkesburg and even to Atglen were under discussion by state Congressman Jim Gerlach, R-PA 6, and the Delaware Valley Regional Planning Commission. On March 7, 2019, it was announced that SEPTA service would be extended back to Coatesville "in the near future", with a new Coatesville station to be built.

The Cynwyd Line service also uses the line between 30th Street Station and the Valley interlocking. The proposed Schuylkill Valley Metro service to Reading would have also used this line. There is also a proposal to shift the line to eliminate a deteriorating truss bridge.

A project to bring commuter rail service between Harrisburg and Lancaster called the Capital Red Rose Corridor proposed to bring rail service to South Central Pennsylvania. In 2011, after numerous proposals, the project was canceled due to a lack of political will and funding.

SEPTA's capital budget for fiscal year 2006 financed an $80.594 million project with Amtrak to improve infrastructure along the line. SEPTA's effort to improve tracks 1 and 4 between Zoo and Paoli interlockings, included:

- Installation of 85,000 concrete crossties, track surfacing, and alignment
- Replacement of jointed rail with continuous welded rail
- Upgraded signal and communication systems
- Replacement of Bryn Mawr interlocking tracks
- Reconfiguration and replacement of Paoli interlocking tracks
- Improvements to pedestrian underpasses and ROW retaining walls

=== Freight service ===
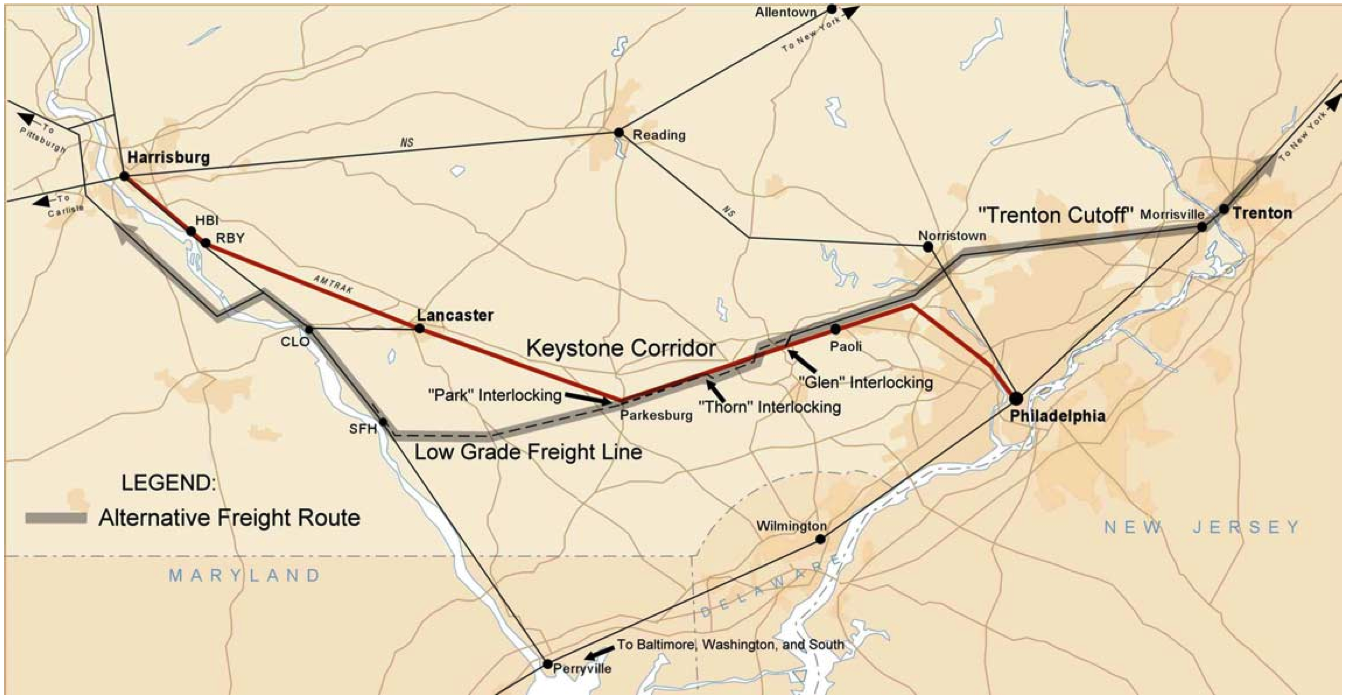
Map of Keystone Corridor showing alternate freight routes

Norfolk Southern operates overnight freight service over the Amtrak-owned portion of the corridor via trackage rights, generally between the western end of the Trenton Cutoff and the area just west of Parkesburg. A principal customer is the Cleveland-Cliffs steel plate plant in Coatesville, formerly operated by ArcelorMittal until its acquisition by Cleveland-Cliffs in December 2020. Norfolk Southern also operates Enola Yard, a major freight classification yard on the west bank of the Susquehanna River across from Harrisburg.

Two former Pennsylvania Railroad electrified through-freight lines paralleling the Main Line — the Atglen and Susquehanna Branch (also known as the Low-Grade Line) and the Philadelphia and Thorndale Branch — were progressively abandoned by Conrail in the late 1980s and 1990, after Conrail diverted Harrisburg-bound freight onto former Reading Company routes. Norfolk Southern conveyed the Atglen and Susquehanna right-of-way to seven Lancaster County townships in July 2008. Amtrak retained ownership of the 138 kV electrical transmission lines that run along the corridor between Safe Harbor Dam and the Parkesburg substation, and replaced the original Pennsylvania Railroad catenary poles with utility-style monopoles in 2012. Much of the former Atglen and Susquehanna alignment has since been developed by local municipalities as the Enola Low Grade Trail. The former Philadelphia and Thorndale Branch right-of-way is now owned by the Pennsylvania Department of Transportation and is being developed in phases as an extension of the Chester Valley Trail, a bicycle and pedestrian rail-trail.

Although portions of the route remain electrified for Amtrak passenger service, Norfolk Southern's freight trains over the corridor are hauled by diesel locomotives.

=== Former services ===
The Broadway Limited, a train that operated between Chicago and New York, used the Keystone Corridor between Pittsburgh and Philadelphia and the Northeast Corridor between Philadelphia and New York. Originally a Pennsylvania Railroad train, this route was discontinued by Amtrak in 1995 but later restarted by the passenger rail company and renamed the Three Rivers. The Three Rivers was discontinued in 2005. (Amtrak's current Chicago-to-Washington, D.C. service, the Capitol Limited, uses the rail line west of Pittsburgh).

== Stations ==
Milepost (km)	Station	Location	Current station opened	Services			Connections
Milepost (km)	Station	Location	Current station opened	P/T	KS	PA	Connections
0.0 mi (0 km)	Suburban Station	Philadelphia	September 28, 1930	●			SEPTA Regional Rail: all lines SEPTA Metro: (at 15th Street/City Hall); SEPTA City Bus: 2, 4, 16, 17, 27, 31, 32, 33, 38, 44, 48, 62; SEPTA Suburban Bus: 124, 125
1.0 mi (1.6 km)	30th Street Station	Philadelphia	1933	●	●	●	Amtrak: Acela, Cardinal, Carolinian, Crescent, Northeast Regional, Palmetto, Silver Meteor, Silver Star, Vermonter; SEPTA Regional Rail: all lines NJ Transit Rail: ■ Atlantic City Line; SEPTA Metro: SEPTA City Bus: 9, 12, 21, 30, 31, 42, 44, 49, 62, LUCY; SEPTA Suburban Bus: 124, 125
5.4 mi (8.7 km)	Overbrook	Philadelphia	1860	●			SEPTA City Bus: 63, 65
6.0 mi (9.7 km)	Merion	Lower Merion	1914	●			
6.8 mi (10.9 km)	Narberth	Narberth	September 11, 1915	●			SEPTA City Bus: 44
7.4 mi (11.9 km)	Wynnewood	Wynnewood	1870	●			SEPTA Suburban Bus: 105
8.5 mi (13.7 km)	Ardmore	Ardmore	1870	●	●		SEPTA City Bus: 44; SEPTA Suburban Bus: 103, 105, 106
9.1 mi (14.6 km)	Haverford	Haverford	1880	●			SEPTA Suburban Bus: 105, 106
10.1 mi (16.3 km)	Bryn Mawr	Bryn Mawr	1869	●			SEPTA Suburban Bus: 105, 106
10.9 mi (17.5 km)	Rosemont	Rosemont	1871	●			SEPTA Suburban Bus: 105, 106
12.0 mi (19.3 km)	Villanova	Radnor	1890	●			SEPTA Suburban Bus: 106
13.0 mi (20.9 km)	Radnor	Radnor	1872	●			SEPTA Suburban Bus: 106
13.7 mi (22.0 km)	St. Davids	Radnor	1890	●			SEPTA Suburban Bus: 106
14.5 mi (23.3 km)	Wayne	Radnor	1884	●			SEPTA Suburban Bus: 106
15.4 mi (24.8 km)	Strafford	Tredyffrin	1876	●			
16.4 mi (26.4 km)	Devon	Easttown	1890	●			SEPTA Suburban Bus: 106
17.5 mi (28.2 km)	Berwyn	Easttown	1884	●			SEPTA Suburban Bus: 106
18.6 mi (29.9 km)	Daylesford	Tredyffrin		●			SEPTA Suburban Bus: 106
19.9 mi (32.0 km)	Paoli	Paoli	1893	●	●	●	SEPTA Suburban Bus: 92, 106, 204, 206
21.6 mi (34.8 km)	Malvern	Malvern	1900	●			SEPTA Suburban Bus: 92
27.5 mi (44.3 km)	Exton	Exton	1981	●	●	EB	SEPTA Suburban Bus: 135; WCU Shuttle
28.3 mi (45.5 km)	Whitford	Exton	1880	●			
32.4 mi (52.1 km)	Downingtown	Downingtown		●	●		SEPTA Suburban Bus: 135
35.5 mi (57.1 km)	Thorndale	Thorndale	November 22, 1999	●			SEPTA Suburban Bus: 135
38.4 mi (61.8 km)	Coatesville	Coatesville	1868		●		SEPTA Suburban Bus: 135; TMACC: Coatesville Link
44.2 mi (71.1 km)	Parkesburg	Parkesburg	1905		●		TMACC: Coatesville Link
68.0 mi (109.4 km)	Lancaster	Lancaster	1929		●	●	Red Rose Transit Authority: 1, 6, 10, 11, 19
80.1 mi (128.9 km)	Mount Joy	Mount Joy			●		Red Rose Transit Authority: 18
86.8 mi (139.7 km)	Elizabethtown	Elizabethtown	1915		●	●	Red Rose Transit Authority: 18
94.7 mi (152.4 km)	Middletown	Middletown	1990		●		CAT: 7
104.6 mi (168.3 km)	Harrisburg Transportation Center	Harrisburg	1887		●	●	CAT, Lebanon Transit, rabbittransit Fullington Trailways; Greyhound Lines
164.6 mi (264.9 km)	Lewistown	Lewistown	1849			●	
195.6 mi (314.8 km)	Huntingdon	Huntingdon	1872			●	
225.6 mi (363.1 km)	Tyrone	Tyrone	1880			●	
240.6 mi (387.2 km)	Altoona Transportation Center	Altoona	1986			●	Altoona Metro Transit; Greyhound Lines
282.0 mi (453.8 km)	Johnstown	Johnstown	October 12, 1916			●	CamTran
309.0 mi (497.3 km)	Latrobe	Latrobe	1903			●	Westmoreland County Transit Authority: 9A
319.0 mi (513.4 km)	Greensburg	Greensburg	1910			●	Westmoreland County Transit Authority 4, 6, 6C
349.0 mi (561.7 km)	Pittsburgh Union Station	Pittsburgh	1903			●	Amtrak: Capitol Limited; PAAC: 1, 6, 11, 15, 29, 31, 39, 40, 44, G31, P1, P2, P7, P10, P12, P16, P17, P67, P68, P69, P71, P76, P78

== See also ==
- High-speed rail in the United States
