= St. Davids station =

SEPTA rail station in Philadelphia

St. Davids
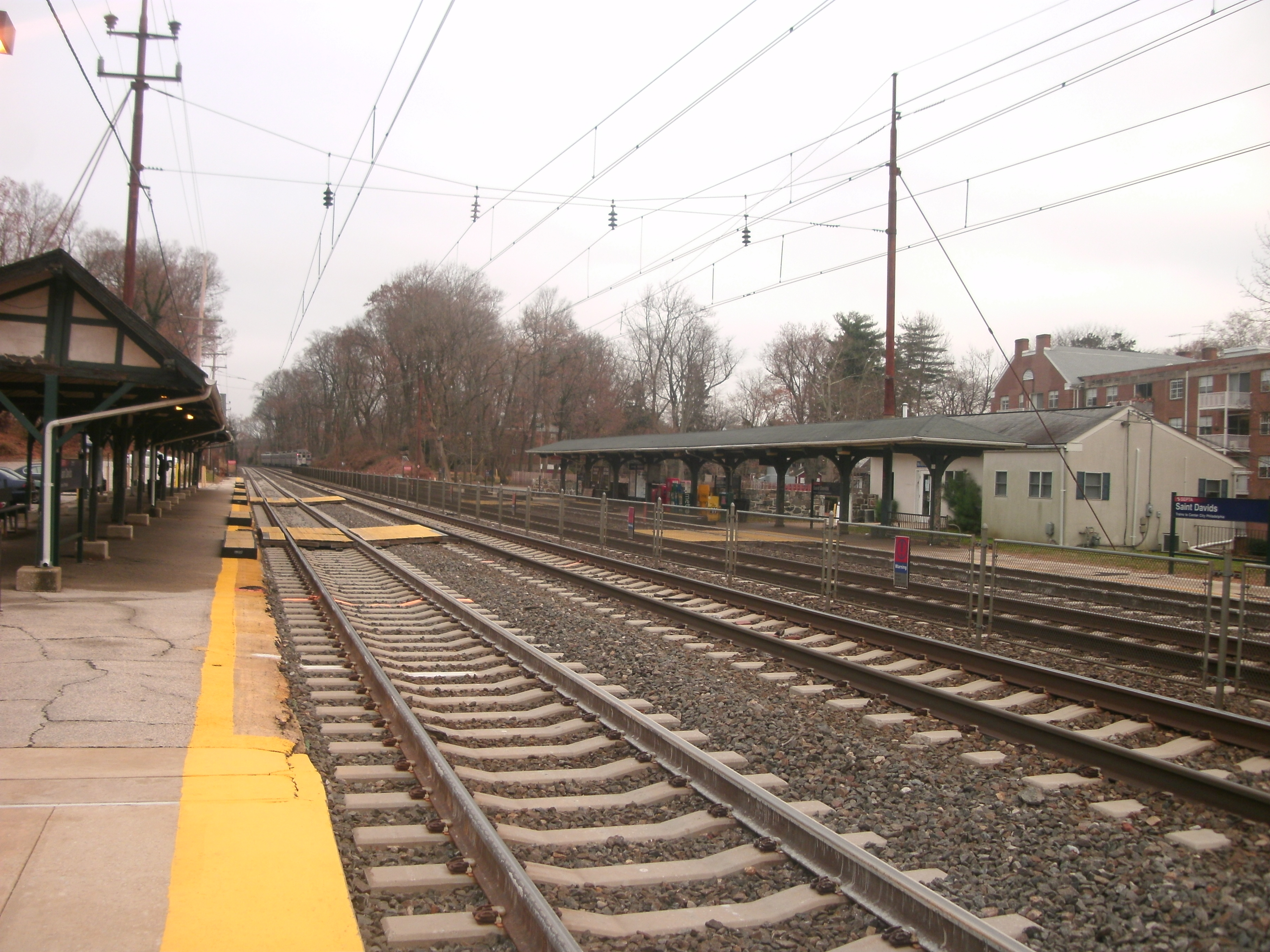
- The Saint Davids station, facing east, including the tracks and the inbound and outbound platforms

General information
- Location: 53 Chamounix Road; Wayne, Pennsylvania; United States
- Coordinates: 40.0439°N 75.3735°W
- Owner: Amtrak
- Operator: SEPTA
- Line: Amtrak Philadelphia to Harrisburg Main Line (Keystone Corridor)
- Platforms: 2 side platforms
- Tracks: 4
- Connections: SEPTA Suburban Bus: 105

Construction
- Parking: 107 spaces (57 daily, 50 public daily)
- Cycle facilities: 4 racks (14 spaces)
- Accessible: No

Other information
- Fare zone: 3

History
- Opened: 1890
- Electrified: September 11, 1915

Passengers
- 2017: 242 (weekday boardings)

Services
Preceding station	SEPTA	Following station
Wayne toward Thorndale	Paoli/Thorndale Line	Radnor toward Temple University
Former services
Preceding station	Pennsylvania Railroad	Following station
Wayne toward Chicago	Main Line	Bryn Mawr toward New York or Exchange Place
Wayne toward Paoli	Paoli Line	Radnor toward Suburban Station
Location

St. Davids station is a regional rail station located in the western suburbs of Philadelphia at the intersection of Chamounix Road & Glynn Lane, Wayne, Pennsylvania. The station and community are named after the nearby historic Episcopal church.

== Service and facilities ==
St. Davids is served by most Paoli/Thorndale Line trains. There is no ticket office at this station. There are 107 parking spaces at the station (57 SEPTA spaces, 50 non-SEPTA spaces). There are also 5 bike racks available that can accommodate up to 20 bikes. It is in Radnor Township.

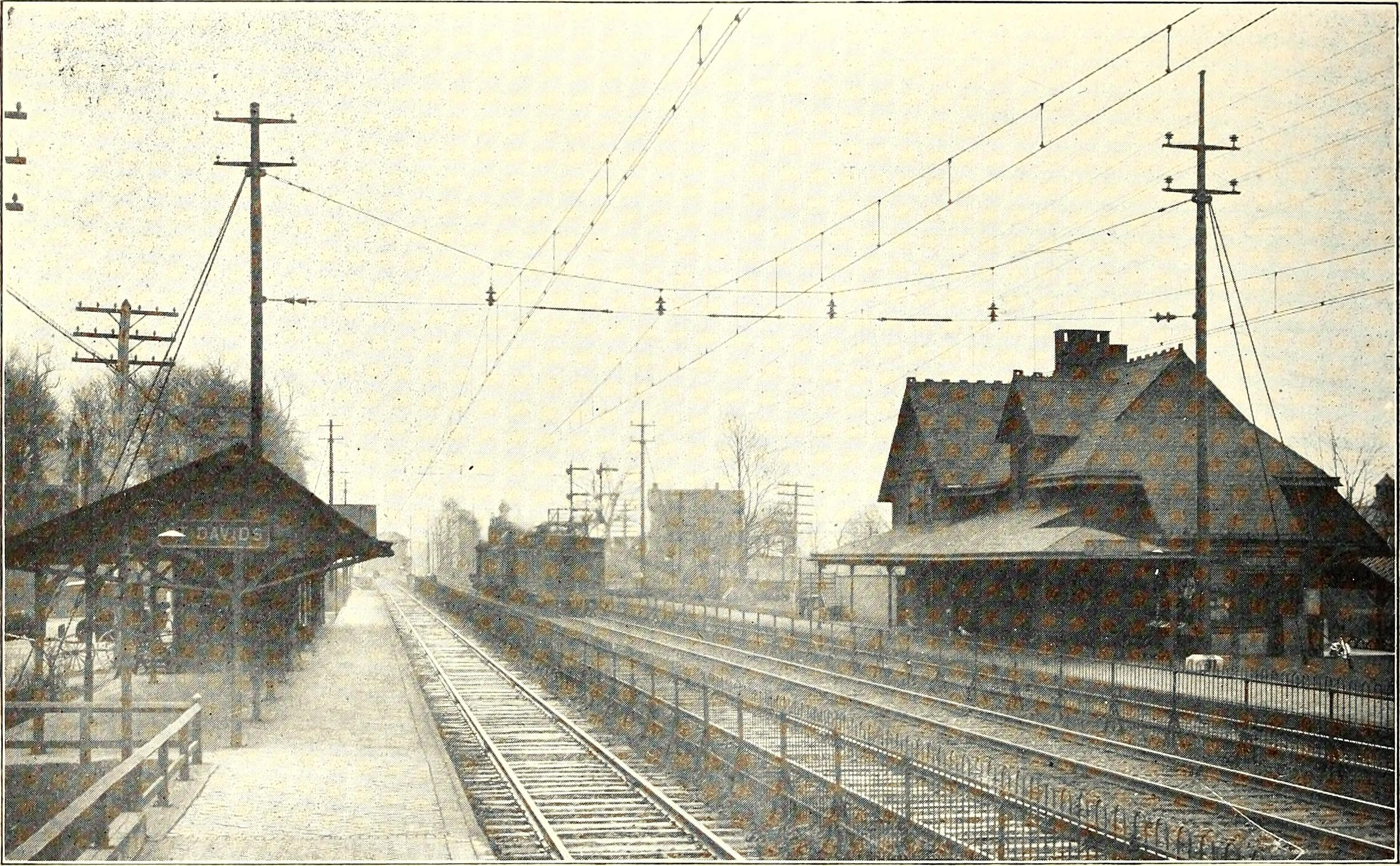
St. Davids shortly after electrification, 1914

St. Davids station is 13.7 track miles from Philadelphia's Suburban Station. A depot building was built in 1890 by the Pennsylvania Railroad, but was demolished by 1966 and replaced with a smaller structure. In 2017, the average total weekday boardings at this station was 242, and the average total weekday alightings was 278.

As of 2025, there is an ongoing effort to raise funding for a planned restoration of the station shelters to their original 19th-century condition. This restoration includes replacing later woodwork that utilized simple designs not matching original specifications, return of cast-iron Pennsylvania Railroad station signage, and repainting the station shelters to historically accurate colors.

== Station layout ==
St. Davids has two low-level side platforms with pathways connecting the platforms to the inner tracks.

== Incidents ==
- On April 5, 1920, eastbound freight train 267 of the Pennsylvania Railroad carrying a load of automobiles, toys, dental equipment, and felt derailed near the station due to a coupling failure on the first car. Over 20 boxcars were wrecked in the incident, though no injuries were reported.
- On January 25, 1973, two women were struck and killed by a single-car passenger train while crossing the tracks at the station. A third person was also struck by the train while trying to push one woman from the tracks and survived.

== Notable places nearby ==
- St. David's Episcopal Church
- Eastern University
