= Capital Red Rose Corridor =

Proposed Pennsylvania rail service

Capital Red Rose Corridor (formerly Corridor One)

Overview
- Owner: Capital Area Transit (CAT) and Modern Transit Partnership
- Locale: South Central Pennsylvania
- Termini: Harrisburg Transportation Center, Harrisburg, Pennsylvania; Lancaster Station, Lancaster, Pennsylvania
- Stations: 6

Service
- Type: Commuter rail
- Services: along the Keystone Corridor

Technical
- Line length: 36 mi (58 km)
- Track gauge: 4 ft 8 1/2 in (1,435 mm) standard gauge
- Electrification: Overhead lines

Capital Red Rose Corridor, formerly known as Corridor One (corporately styled CORRIDORone), was a proposal for commuter rail service in South Central Pennsylvania, United States, between Harrisburg and Lancaster. In mid-2008, the official name of the project was changed to the Capital Red Rose Corridor, after a successful write in campaign was launched resulting in over 800 submissions. However, in 2011, following numerous studies and the passage of a number of years, the Modern Transit Partnership determined that there was neither the political will nor adequate funding to implement that first leg at that time. No further study of commuter rail is planned.

== Project background ==
The Capital Red Rose Corridor project sought to implement regional rail service along existing rail facilities within the lower Susquehanna Valley, linking Lancaster with Harrisburg. Original planning of the corridor would have extended service along a 54-mile stretch between Lancaster, Harrisburg and Carlisle, Cumberland County; however, the Harrisburg to Carlisle segment was dropped from the proposal in 2005. Planning and analysis activities related to the proposed Corridor One regional rail system have been ongoing since 1993. Five studies were conducted:

- Phase I Transit Alternatives Study, 1993.
- Phase II Regional Transit Alternatives Study, 1996.
- Transportation Investment Study, 1998.
- Federal Transit Administration New Starts Application, 2001.
- Transitional Analysis, 2002.

The result of these studies was the identification of a regional rail service known as Corridor One, that would be constructed from Lancaster to Harrisburg, and serve as the locally preferred alternative for improving mobility and accessibility in the greater Harrisburg area.

The project would have used existing Amtrak rail line within the Keystone Corridor to provide passenger service to Lancaster. This service would utilize the existing passenger stations in place at:

- Harrisburg
- Middletown
- Elizabethtown
- Mount Joy
- Lancaster

In early 2005, the MTP ratified an agreement with the Cumberland County Commissioners to terminate service in Harrisburg—as opposed to continuing across the river into Cumberland County—at their request.

== See also ==
- Capital Area Transit (Harrisburg)
- High-speed rail in the United States
- Philadelphia to Harrisburg Main Line
