= Altoona Transportation Center =

Railroad and bus station in Altoona, Pennsylvania, US

Altoona Transportation Center Altoona, PA
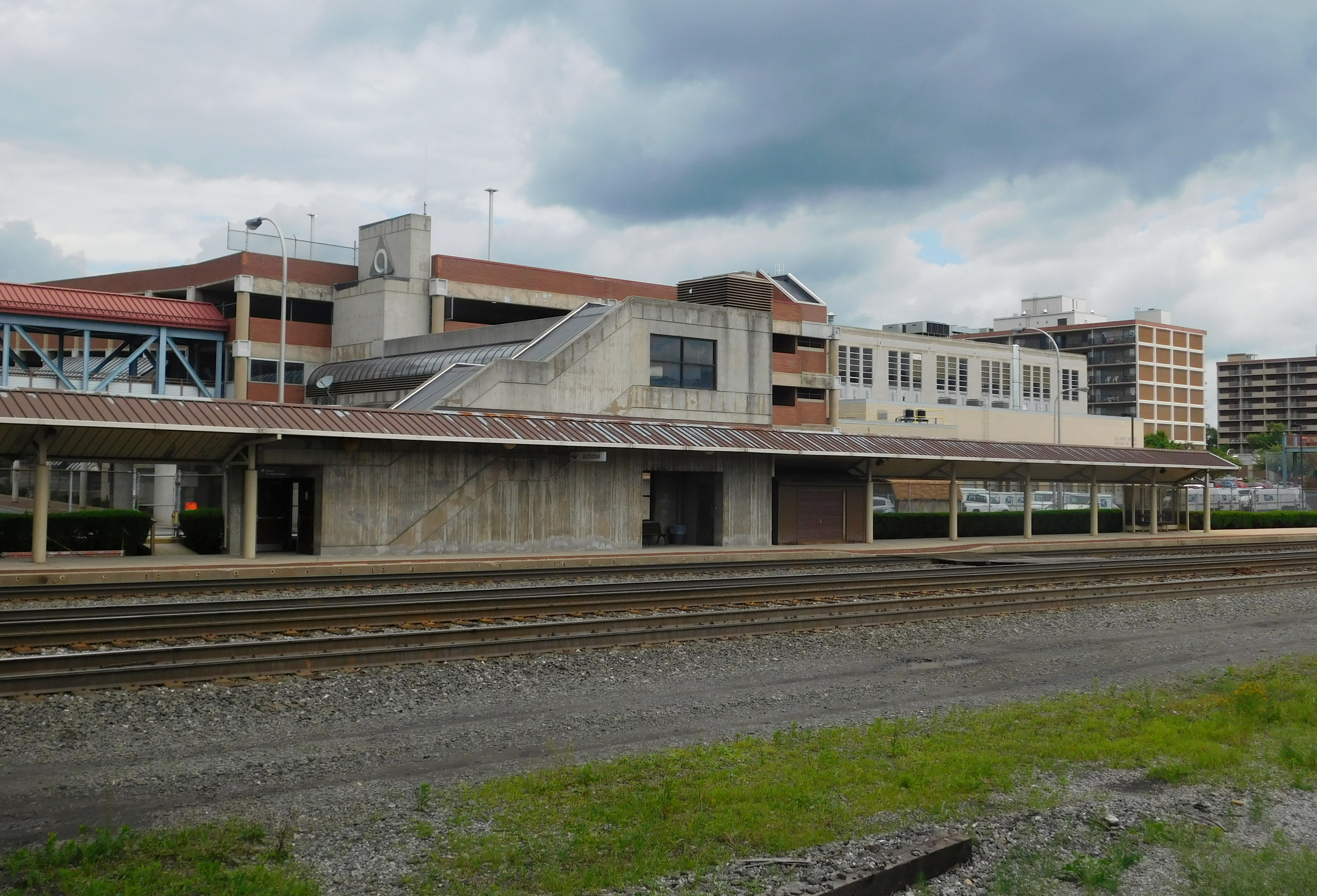
- Altoona Transportation Center's Amtrak platform

General information
- Location: 1231 11th Avenue; Altoona, Pennsylvania; United States
- Coordinates: 40°30′56″N 78°24′4″W
- Owner: City of Altoona
- Line: NS Pittsburgh Line (Keystone Corridor)
- Platforms: 1 side platform
- Tracks: 4
- Connections: AMTRAN: 1, 2, 3, 4, 5, 6, 7, 9, 11, 12, 14; Greyhound Lines

Construction
- Accessible: Yes

Other information
- Station code: Amtrak: ALT

History
- Rebuilt: 1887; 1972; 1983–1986

Passengers
- FY 2025: 22,164 (Amtrak)

Services
Preceding station	Amtrak	Following station
Johnstown toward Pittsburgh	Pennsylvanian	Tyrone toward New York
Former services
Preceding station	Amtrak	Following station
Johnstown toward Chicago	Three Rivers 1995–2005	Tyrone toward New York
Johnstown toward Chicago	Broadway Limited Until 1995	Huntingdon toward New York
Johnstown toward Kansas City	National Limited Until 1979	Tyrone toward New York or Washington, D.C.
Johnstown toward Pittsburgh	Fort Pitt 1981-1983	Terminus
Location

The Altoona Transportation Center is an intermodal passenger facility in downtown Altoona, Pennsylvania. It is served by the two daily round trips of the Amtrak Pennsylvanian, Greyhound Lines intercity buses, and AMTRAN local bus service (for which is serves as the hub). The station was built in 1986, replacing a temporary station, which had in turn replaced the 1887-built Pennsylvania Railroad station in 1972.

== History ==
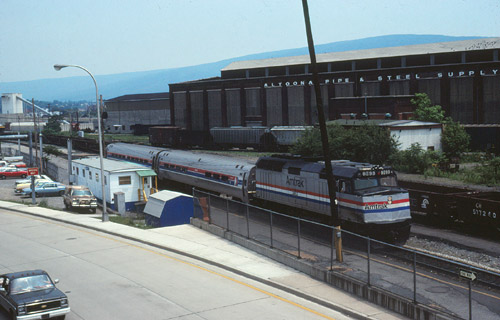
A westbound Pennsylvanian stops at the temporary station, June 1981

The Altoona Transportation Center stands on the site of the old Altoona station, which was constructed in 1887 immediately to the West of the Logan House Hotel. When Amtrak took over intercity passenger service in May 1971, it retained two daily round trips serving Altoona – the Duquesne and the combined Broadway Limited/Spirit of St. Louis. The Spirit of St. Louis was renamed National Limited on July 12, 1971, and began operating separately from the Broadway Limited between Pittsburgh and Harrisburgh. The Duquesne was renamed Keystone on November 14, 1971, and discontinued on April 30, 1972. To replace it, the National Limited was rescheduled to no longer cross Pennsylvania late at night.

Amtrak and Penn Central vacated the old station effective November 6, 1972; it was demolished to make room for a parking garage. Although Penn Central originally planned a $400,000 replacement station, a 12-by-60-foot (3.7 m × 18.3 m) trailer instead served as a ticket office and waiting room. The National Limited was discontinued on October 1, 1979. It was replaced by the Pennsylvanian on April 27, 1980. From April 26, 1981, to January 30, 1983, the Fort Pitt provided an additional Altoona–Pittsburgh service.

Planning of an improved transportation center was a controversial topic in the Altoona area. Candidates for city positions structured their campaigns around the expense of, feasibility of, and location of the pending transit hub. Projected costs ranged anywhere from $10 million to $3 million. On August 12, 1982, the Altoona Area Chamber of Commerce voted unanimously in favor of a new Transportation Center. By October of the same year Harry Weese and Associates, an architectural firm from Washington D.C., had been chosen to conduct a series of surveys in order to determine the optimal location for the proposed structure. Ultimately, urban renewal parcels 14A, 14B, 16A, and 16B were chosen, and the Transportation Center was merged into an existing Altoona Parking Authority project, creating the hybrid parking garage/transit facility that exists today. The facility opened on October 23, 1986 after being completed for $3.2 million, an estimated $500,000 under budget. The cost of construction was completely covered by a federal grant.

In 1995, the Broadway Limited was replaced by the Three Rivers. The Pennsylvanian was discontinued in November 2004, leaving Altoona with only a single daily round trip. The Pennsylvanian resumed on March 7, 2005, when the Three Rivers was discontinued. In March 2020, the Pennsylvanian was suspended as part of a system-wide service reduction in response to the growing COVID-19 pandemic. Service resumed on June 1, 2020.
