= Pennsylvanian (train) =

Amtrak service between Pittsburgh and New York

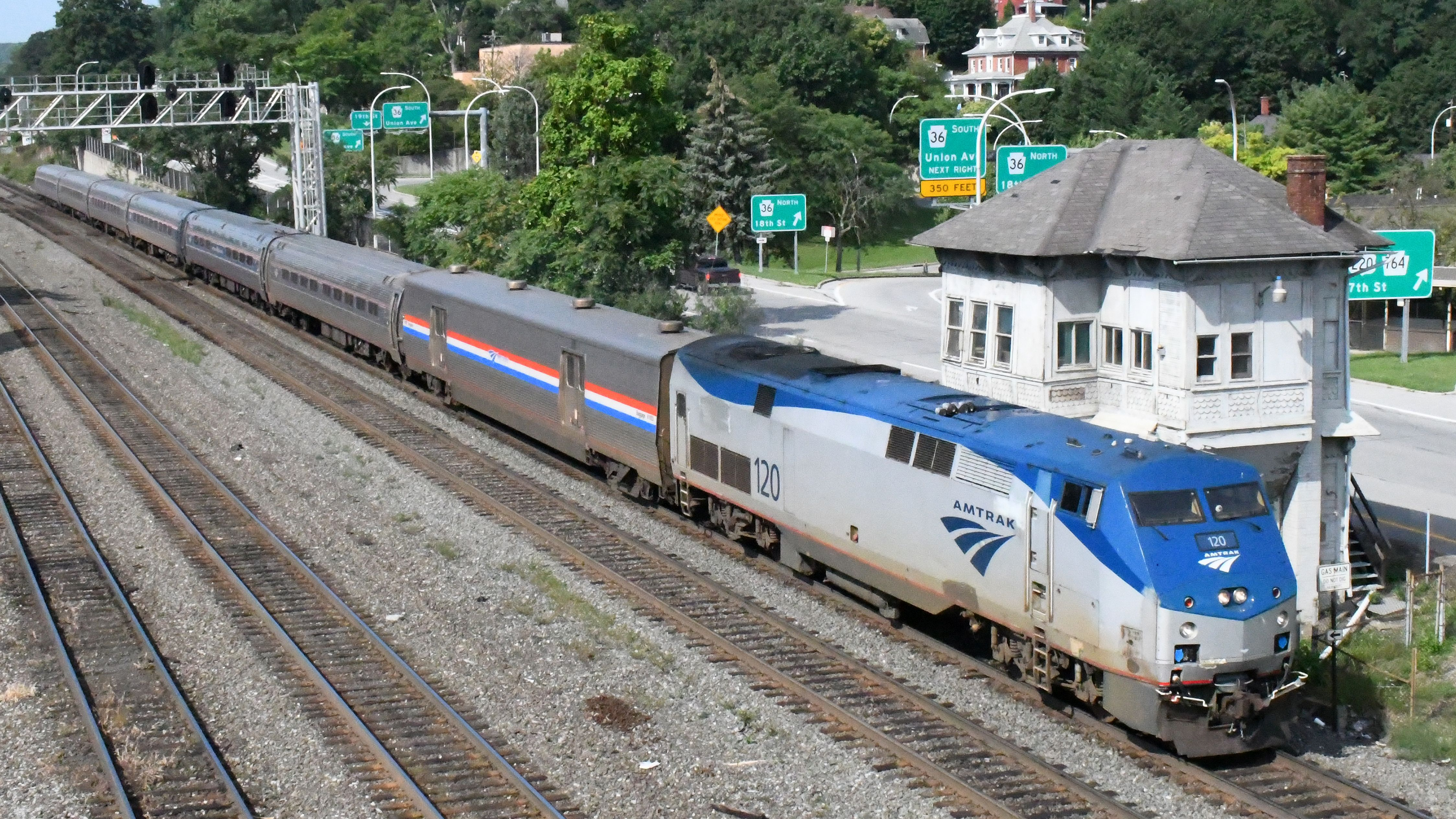
- The Pennsylvanian in Altoona, Pennsylvania in 2021

Overview
- Service type: Inter-city rail
- First service: April 27, 1980
- Current operator: Amtrak
- Annual ridership: 236,003 (FY 25) ▲0.9% (Note: Amtrak's Fiscal Year (FY) runs from October 1 of the prior year to September 30 of the named year.)

Route
- Termini: Pittsburgh, Pennsylvania; New York City, New York
- Stops: 17
- Distance travelled: 444 miles (715 km)
- Average journey time: 9 hours, 15 minutes (westbound); 9 hours, 20 minutes (eastbound)
- Service frequency: Two daily round trips
- Train number: 42−45

On-board services
- Classes: Coach Class; Business Class
- Disabled access: All cars, most stations
- Catering facilities: Café
- Baggage facilities: Overhead racks, checked baggage available at selected stations

Technical
- Rolling stock: Amfleet cars
- Track gauge: 4 ft 8 1/2 in (1,435 mm) standard gauge
- Electrification: Overhead line, 12 kV AC at 25 Hz (Philadelphia–New York)
- Operating speed: 48 mph (77 km/h) (avg.); 110 mph (180 km/h) (top, Keystone Corridor); 125 mph (201 km/h) (top, Northeast Corridor)
- Track owners: Amtrak, NS

The Pennsylvanian is a 444-mile (715 km) Amtrak train running between Pittsburgh and New York City, via Philadelphia. Two daily round trips are operated. The trains travel across the Appalachian Mountains, through Pennsylvania's capital Harrisburg, the Pennsylvania Dutch Country, suburban and central Philadelphia, and New Jersey en-route to New York. The entire train ride takes about 9 hours total: 5 1/2 hours between Pittsburgh and Harrisburg, 2 hours between Harrisburg and Philadelphia, and 1 1/2 between Philadelphia and New York.

The Pennsylvanian uses the same Amtrak-owned Philadelphia-Harrisburg Main Line as the Keystone Service trains, but continues further west via the Pittsburgh Line through Altoona and the Allegheny Mountains, eventually terminating at Pittsburgh. The Main Line and Pittsburgh Line collectively make up the Keystone Corridor, a federally-designated corridor for high-speed rail service.

The Pennsylvanian began service on April 27, 1980, as a replacement for the National Limited. Initially operating between Philadelphia and Pittsburgh, it was extended east to New York City in 1983. From 1998 to 2003, it was changed to a Philadelphia–Pittsburgh–Chicago train. It was merged into the New York–Chicago Three Rivers in 2004, leaving only a single daily round trip on the Harrisburg–Pittsburgh segment. The Three Rivers was discontinued in 2005; the Pennsylvanian resumed service. A second daily round trip was added on November 18, 2026.

== History ==
=== 20th century ===
Prior to Amtrak's founding, the Pennsylvanian route was covered by the Duquesne, named after Fort Duquesne in Pittsburgh, and by the Juniata. Both trains operated by the Pennsylvania Railroad and from 1968 to 1971 by the PRR's successor, the Penn Central. The Duquesne had a long history, finally becoming a daily New York–Pittsburgh train on October 25, 1959, numbered 16 eastbound and 25 westbound. When the Pennsylvania Railroad's successor, Penn Central, was formed in 1968, it continued to operate the Duquesne and the Juniata.

With the start of Amtrak operations on May 1, 1971, the Duquesne was renamed the Keystone and renumbered 42 westbound and 43 eastbound with the first Amtrak timetable on November 14, 1971. The Keystone was discontinued on April 30, 1972.

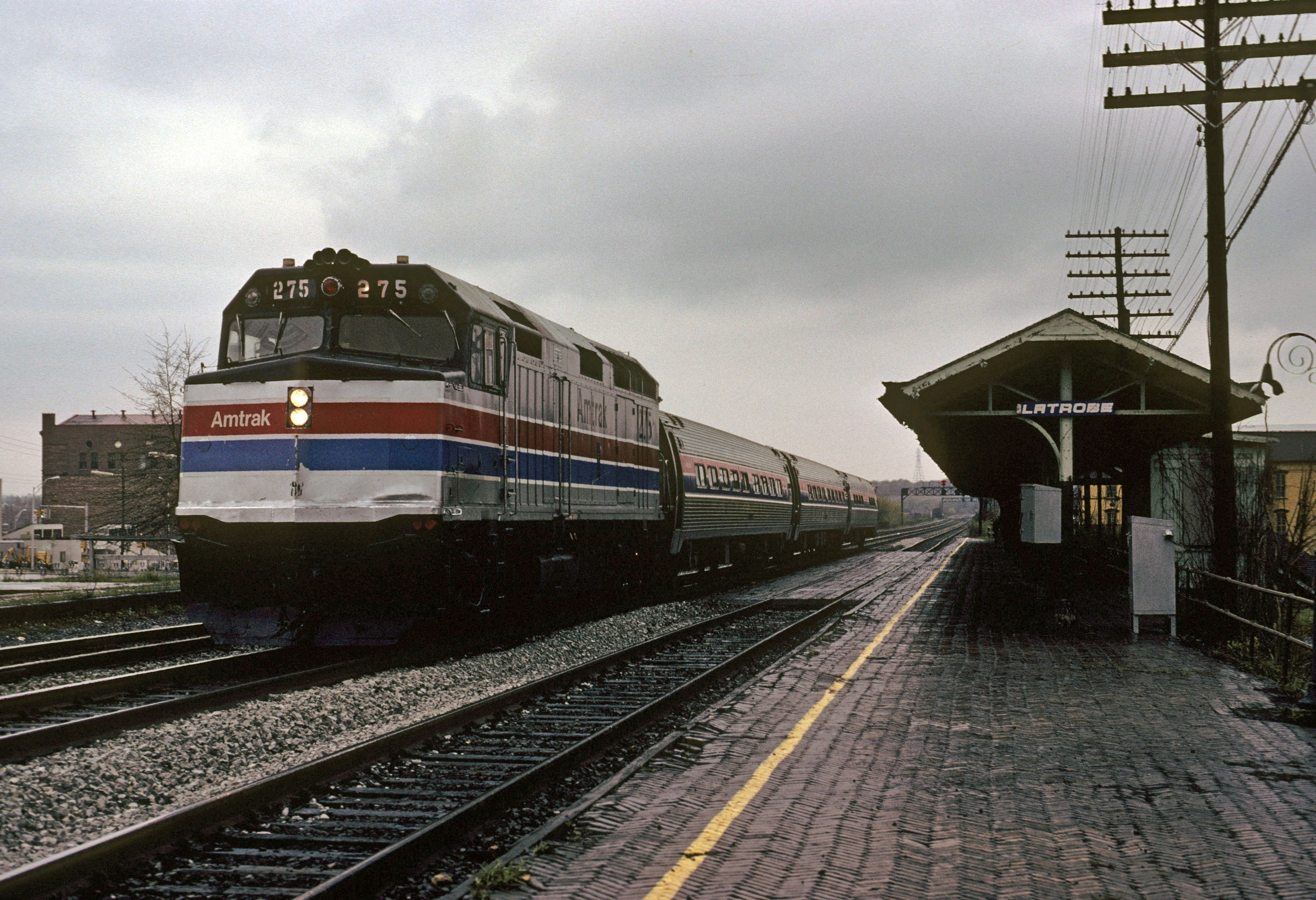
The first eastbound run of the Pennsylvanian in Latrobe, Pennsylvania, April 28, 1980

The Pennsylvanian was introduced on April 27, 1980, as an early state-supported service replacing the New York–Kansas City National Limited, which Amtrak discontinued in 1979 and had previously provided service over the corridor. The National Limited was itself the successor to the Spirit of St. Louis. The Pennsylvanian operated as a daytime train and initially ran between Pittsburgh and Philadelphia, where passengers could make connections to New York City via a Clocker train arriving from New York and the Montrealer operating toward New York. At the time of its introduction, the Broadway Limited provided overnight sleeper service over much of the same corridor. The Pennsylvanian used Amtrak's then-new Amfleet equipment, including a café car. Pennsylvania agreed to cover 20 percent of the train's costs in the first year (about $580,000), with the state and Amtrak sharing costs equally by the third year.

Between 1981 and 1983, Pennsylvanian equipment was turned every night to operate a second state-supported train, the Fort Pitt, which ran from Pittsburgh to Altoona. Amtrak withdrew this train in early 1983 after the Pennsylvania Department of Transportation (PennDOT) declined to continue subsidizing the increased operation. At the time the Fort Pitt carried 30 passengers per day. On October 30, 1983, the Pennsylvanian was extended to New York City, eliminating the transfer at Philadelphia.

After significant ridership gains in 1984, PennDOT proposed that a second train be added to the route. PennDOT and Amtrak would have split the costs evenly. Amtrak officials were favorable, but budget problems stalled the plan.

In the late 1980s, passenger rail groups urged Amtrak to extend the Pennsylvanian to Cleveland, Ohio. Proposals included new stations in Sewickley and Beaver Falls. Pressure increased in 1989 when Amtrak announced the re-routing of the Broadway Limited and Capitol Limited over that same route as part of a restructuring of routes in Indiana. As part of this change, the Capitol Limited began serving the Cleveland–Pittsburgh route, albeit in the middle of the night. Amtrak and PennDOT considered two routes for an extended Pennsylvanian: one via Alliance, Ohio, following the route of the Capitol Limited, and one via Youngstown, Ohio, partially following the Broadway Limited, with a new stop in New Castle, Pennsylvania.

On November 7, 1998, Amtrak extended the Pennsylvanian through to Chicago along the route of the Capitol Limited via Toledo, finally bringing a daylight connection to Cleveland. The Three Rivers continued to run over a different schedule via Akron, Ohio and Fostoria. As part of the change Amtrak truncated the eastern end to Philadelphia, enabling the train to complete the run within a single day. The change was driven by Amtrak's growing mail and express business; Pittsburgh–Philadelphia ridership suffered.

=== 21st century ===
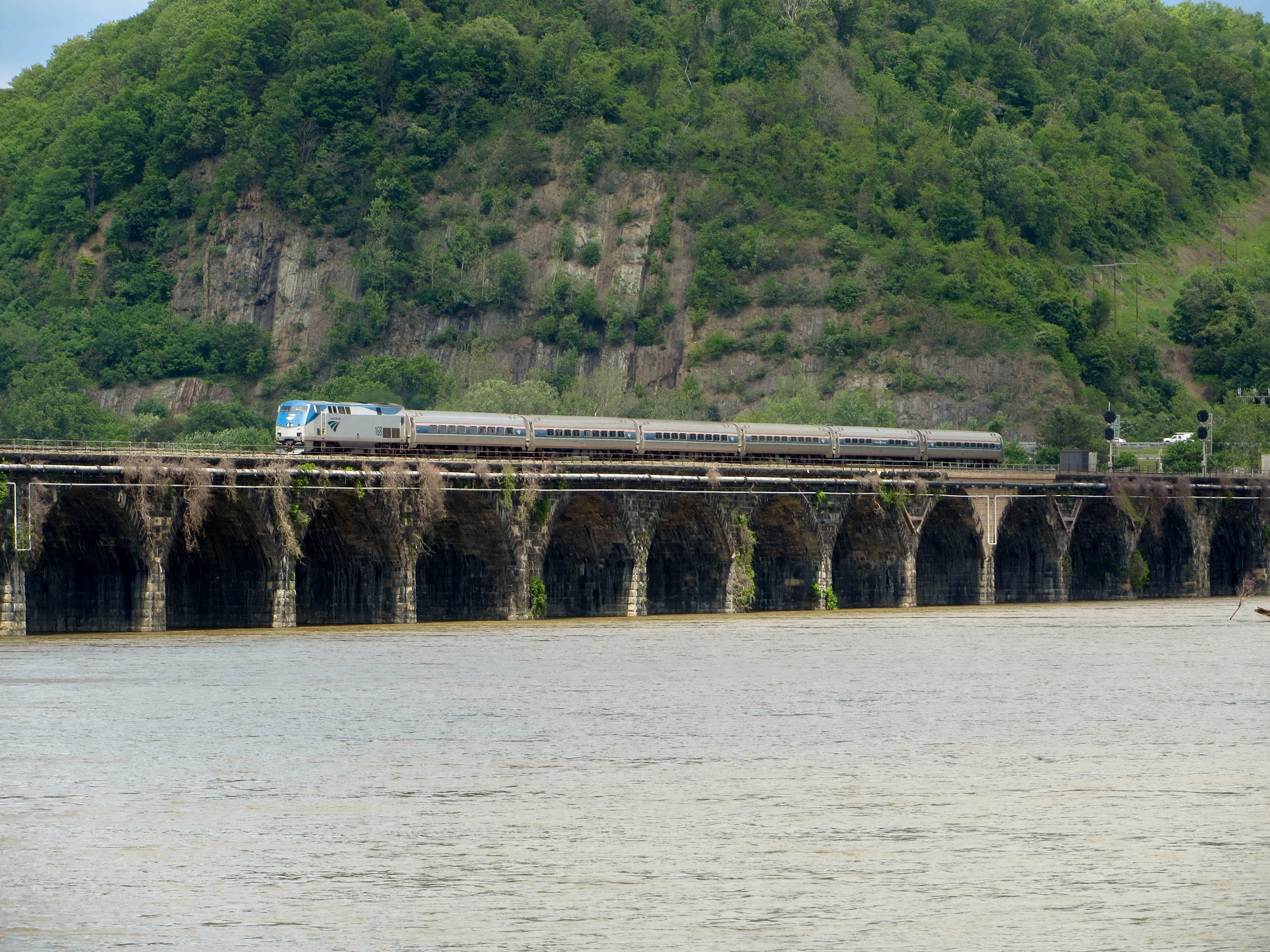
The Pennsylvanian on the Rockville Bridge in 2014

Amtrak returned the Pennsylvanian to the New York–Pittsburgh route on January 27, 2003, citing low ridership and Amtrak's withdrawal from the express freight business. On November 1, 2004, Amtrak merged the Pennsylvanian and Three Rivers, keeping the latter name with a western terminus in Chicago. Amtrak had sought $2.5 million in assistance from Pennsylvania to keep both trains running. On March 8, 2005, Amtrak truncated service to Pittsburgh-New York City, and restored the Pennsylvanian name to the route. Since 2005, there has not been through service west of Pittsburgh from the Pennsylvanian corridor; a transfer to the Floridian is required at Pittsburgh. As part of its 2010 federally mandated analysis of the worst-performing long-distance routes, Amtrak determined that reinstating a through-car connection with the Pennsylvanian would result in the highest gain in monetary and customer service measurements of possible options. To implement this, Amtrak planned to operate a Viewliner sleeper car, an Amfleet cafe car and two Amfleet coaches between Chicago and New York approximating the historic Broadway Limited, via the Capitol Limited and Pennsylvanian.

The train has been primarily financed by the Pennsylvania Department of Transportation since October 1, 2013, when the Rail Safety Improvement Act of 2008 took effect. This federal law eliminated federal subsidies for Amtrak routes less than 750 miles (1,210 km) in length.

In late 2019, the train began operating with a baggage car for checked baggage and bicycle handling at New York, Newark, Philadelphia, Lancaster, Harrisburg, Altoona, Johnstown and Pittsburgh.

In March 2020, service on the Pennsylvanian was suspended as part of a round of service reduction in response to the ongoing COVID-19 pandemic. Service resumed on June 1, 2020.

=== Increased frequency ===
In January 2011, the state received a $750,000 grant from the federal government to study expanding service westwards from Harrisburg to Pittsburgh along the route of the Pennsylvanian, including higher speeds and additional frequencies. The Pennsylvania State Rail Plan 2020 called for a second round-trip Amtrak train between Pittsburgh and New York City, with one trip extended to Cleveland. The second trip was then projected to begin during the fiscal year running from October 2023 to September 2024. The feasibility, schedule, and cost of adding a second train were underway as of November 2020.

In June 2022, the state and Norfolk Southern announced an agreement for a $200 million capacity improvement, with a second Pennsylvanian round trip to be added by 2025. By August 2023, the opening date had slipped to 2026, with construction on the necessary infrastructure planned to start in 2024. In September 2023, the Pennsylvania Department of Transportation and Norfolk Southern reached an agreement on making the necessary $200 million worth of improvements to the line for a second daily service.

In December 2023, the project was awarded $143.6 million from the Federal Railroad Administration (FRA) with PennDOT providing 20% in matching funds. The Pennsylvanian route was also selected into the FRA's Corridor Identification and Development Program, granting $500,000 to study further service increases. The second daily round trip commenced on November 18, 2026.

== Operation ==
=== Equipment ===
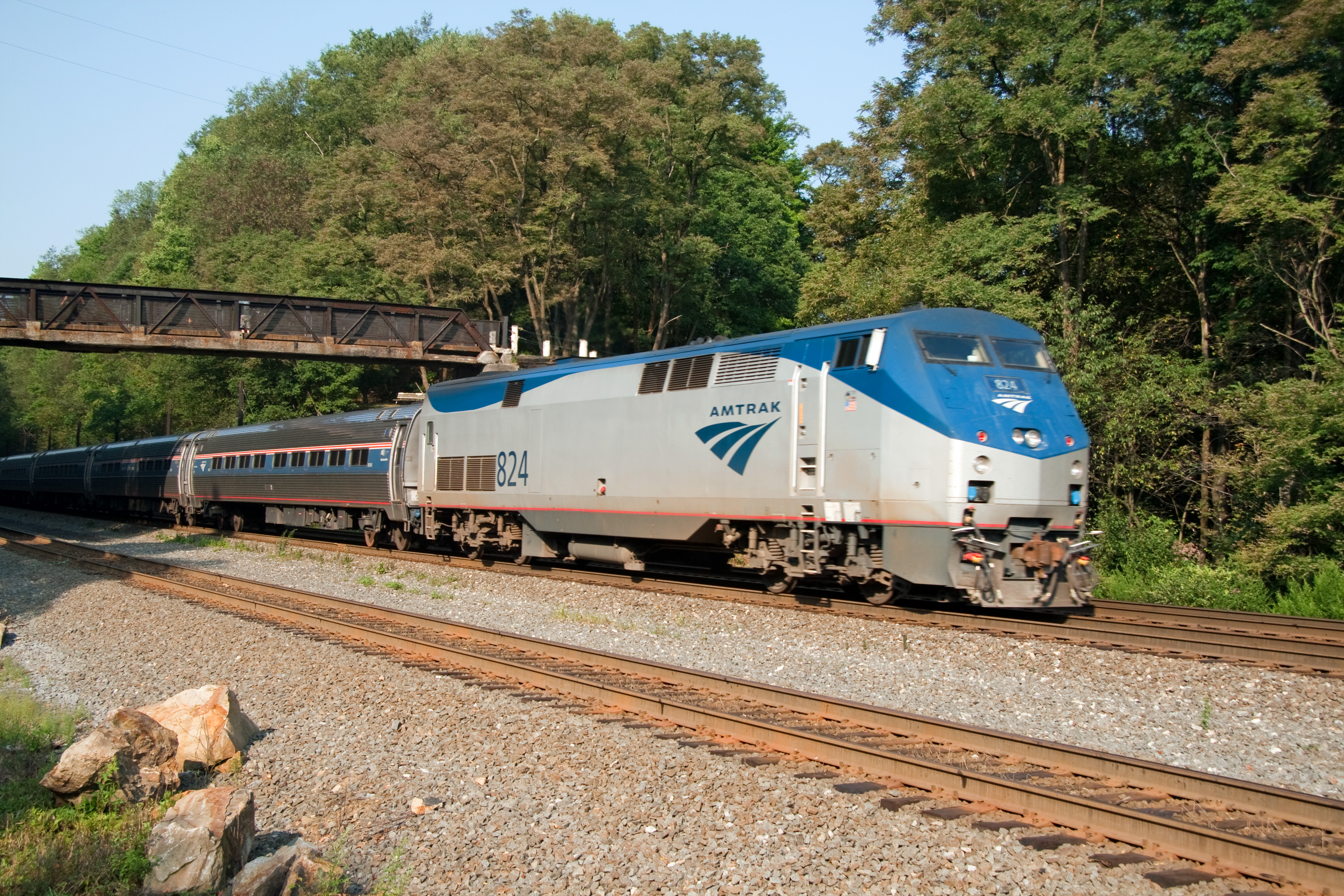
The eastbound Pennsylvanian passing through Cassandra, Pennsylvania

A typical Pennsylvanian consists of a locomotive, a Viewliner baggage car, an Amfleet Business Class coach, Amfleet café car, and four or five Amfleet coaches.

Between Pittsburgh and Philadelphia, trains are pulled by a GE Genesis diesel locomotive at speeds up to 110 mph (177 km/h). Between Philadelphia and New York, the service operates over the Northeast Corridor which has overhead electric lines and trains are pulled by Siemens ACS-64 electric locomotives at speeds up to 125 mph (201 km/h).

By 2031, the train's existing equipment is expected to be replaced by Amtrak Airo trainsets, Amtrak's branding for trainsets combining Siemens Venture passenger cars with a Siemens Charger diesel-electric locomotive. The Pennsylvanian trainsets will include six passenger cars with a food service area and a mix of 2×2 Coach Class and 1×2 Business Class seating. The car nearest the locomotive will be an "Auxiliary Power Vehicle" (APV) equipped with a pantograph to draw power from overhead lines and supply electricity to four electric traction motors in the APV and four in the locomotive. The design is intended to allow near-seamless transitions between diesel and electric operation, eliminating the need for a time-consuming locomotive change in Philadelphia.

=== Classes of service ===
All classes of service include complimentary WiFi, an electric outlet (120 V, 60 Hz AC) at each seat, reading lamps, fold-out tray tables. Reservations are required on all trains, tickets may be purchased online, from an agent at some stations, a ticketing machine at most stations, or, at a higher cost, from the conductor on the train.

- Coach Class: 2×2 seating. Passengers self-select seats on a first-come, first-served basis.
- Business Class: 2×2 seating with complimentary soft drinks.

=== Ridership ===
Over fiscal years 2009–2016, ridership grew from 199,484 to 223,114, an increase of 10.6%. Ridership peaked at 231,720 in FY 2015. Ticket revenue grew from $7,819,404 to $11,555,451, an increase of 47.8%. (Note: Compiled from Amtrak's annual ridership and revenue reports.) Starting in 2017 Amtrak stopped reporting their revenue data alongside ridership data. as such it was excluded.

Starting in fiscal year 2020, Amtrak revised how it calculates ridership, causing a small but noticeable drop in the 2019 numbers. It was chosen to report the revised metrics below.

The impact of COVID-19 was split across FY2020 and FY2021, as reflected in the lower than average passenger numbers across those two years. The pandemic caused an initial drop of ridership in FY2020 of 39% on the route as compared to FY2019. The drop remained throughout FY2021, with a relative drop of 40.3% compared to FY2019, the last fiscal year pre-covid data exists. (Note: Compiled from Amtrak's annual ridership and revenue reports and PennDOT Annual Report.)

=== Route ===
A map of the Pennsylvanian train route

Going westwards, the Pennsylvanian initially follows the portion of the Amtrak-owned Northeast Corridor from New York City to Philadelphia; after a locomotive swap at the north end of the train, the remainder of the route follows the historic Pennsylvania Railroad's Main Line. It reverses direction in Philadelphia and follows the Amtrak-owned Philadelphia to Harrisburg Main Line to Harrisburg. The remaining portion over the Norfolk Southern Railway's Pittsburgh Line follows the Juniata River and then Little Juniata River to Altoona, after which it climbs Allegheny Mountain and then follows the Little Conemaugh River and then Conemaugh River. After crossing Chestnut Ridge, it winds across the Allegheny Plateau before descending Brush Creek and Turtle Creek into the Pittsburgh area.

=== Station stops ===
State	Town/City	Station	Connections
NY	New York City	Penn Station	Amtrak (long-distance): Cardinal, Crescent, Lake Shore Limited, Palmetto, Silver Meteor; Amtrak (intercity): Acela, Adirondack, Berkshire Flyer, Carolinian, Empire Service, Ethan Allen Express, Keystone Service, Maple Leaf, Northeast Regional, Vermonter; Long Island Rail Road: ■ Main Line, ■ Port Washington Branch; NJ Transit: ■ North Jersey Coast Line, ■ Northeast Corridor Line, ■ Gladstone Branch, ■ Montclair–Boonton Line, ■ Morristown Line; NYC Subway: PATH: HOB-33 JSQ-33 JSQ-33 (via HOB); Local bus: MTA Bus; Intercity bus: FlixBus, Tripper Bus, Vamoose Bus
NJ	Newark	Newark Penn Station	Amtrak: Acela, Cardinal, Carolinian, Crescent, Keystone Service, Northeast Regional, Palmetto, Silver Meteor, Vermonter; Newark Light Rail; NJ Transit: ■ North Jersey Coast Line, ■ Northeast Corridor Line, ■ Raritan Valley Line; PATH: NWK-WTC; Local bus: NJ Transit Bus; Intercity bus: Greyhound, Coach USA, FlixBus, Fullington Trailways
NJ	Iselin	Metropark	Amtrak: Acela, Northeast Regional, Keystone Service, Palmetto, Vermonter; NJ Transit: ■ Northeast Corridor Line; Local bus: NJ Transit Bus
NJ	Trenton	Trenton	Amtrak: Cardinal, Carolinian, Crescent, Keystone Service, Northeast Regional, Palmetto, Silver Meteor, Vermonter; NJ Transit: ■ Northeast Corridor Line, ■ River Line; SEPTA Regional Rail: ■ Trenton Line; Local bus: SEPTA Suburban Bus, NJ Transit Bus
PA	Philadelphia	30th Street Station	Amtrak: Acela, Cardinal, Carolinian, Crescent, Keystone Service, Northeast Regional, Palmetto, Silver Meteor, Vermonter; SEPTA Regional Rail: all lines NJ Transit: ■ Atlantic City Line; SEPTA Metro: Local bus: SEPTA City Bus, SEPTA Suburban Bus, NJ Transit Bus; Intercity bus: Martz Trailways
PA	Paoli	Paoli	Amtrak: Keystone Service; SEPTA Regional Rail: ■ Paoli/Thorndale Line; Local bus: SEPTA Suburban Bus
PA	Lancaster	Lancaster	Amtrak: Keystone Service; Local bus: Red Rose Transit Authority
PA	Elizabethtown	Elizabethtown	Amtrak: Keystone Service; Local bus: Red Rose Transit Authority
PA	Harrisburg	Harrisburg Transportation Center	Amtrak: Keystone Service; Local bus: Capital Area Transit, Lebanon Transit, rabbittransit Intercity bus: Greyhound, FlixBus, Fullington Trailways
PA	Lewistown	Lewistown	
PA	Huntingdon	Huntingdon	
PA	Tyrone	Tyrone	Intercity bus: Greyhound
PA	Altoona	Altoona Transportation Center	Local bus: AMTRAN; Intercity bus: Greyhound
PA	Johnstown	Johnstown	Local bus: CamTran; Intercity bus: Greyhound
PA	Latrobe	Latrobe	Local bus: Westmoreland County Transit Authority
PA	Greensburg	Greensburg	Local bus: Westmoreland County Transit Authority
PA	Pittsburgh	Union Station	Amtrak: Floridian; Local bus: Pittsburgh Regional Transit; Intercity bus: Greyhound, FlixBus, Fullington Trailways
