= Tyrone station =

Amtrak train station in Pennsylvania

Tyrone, PA
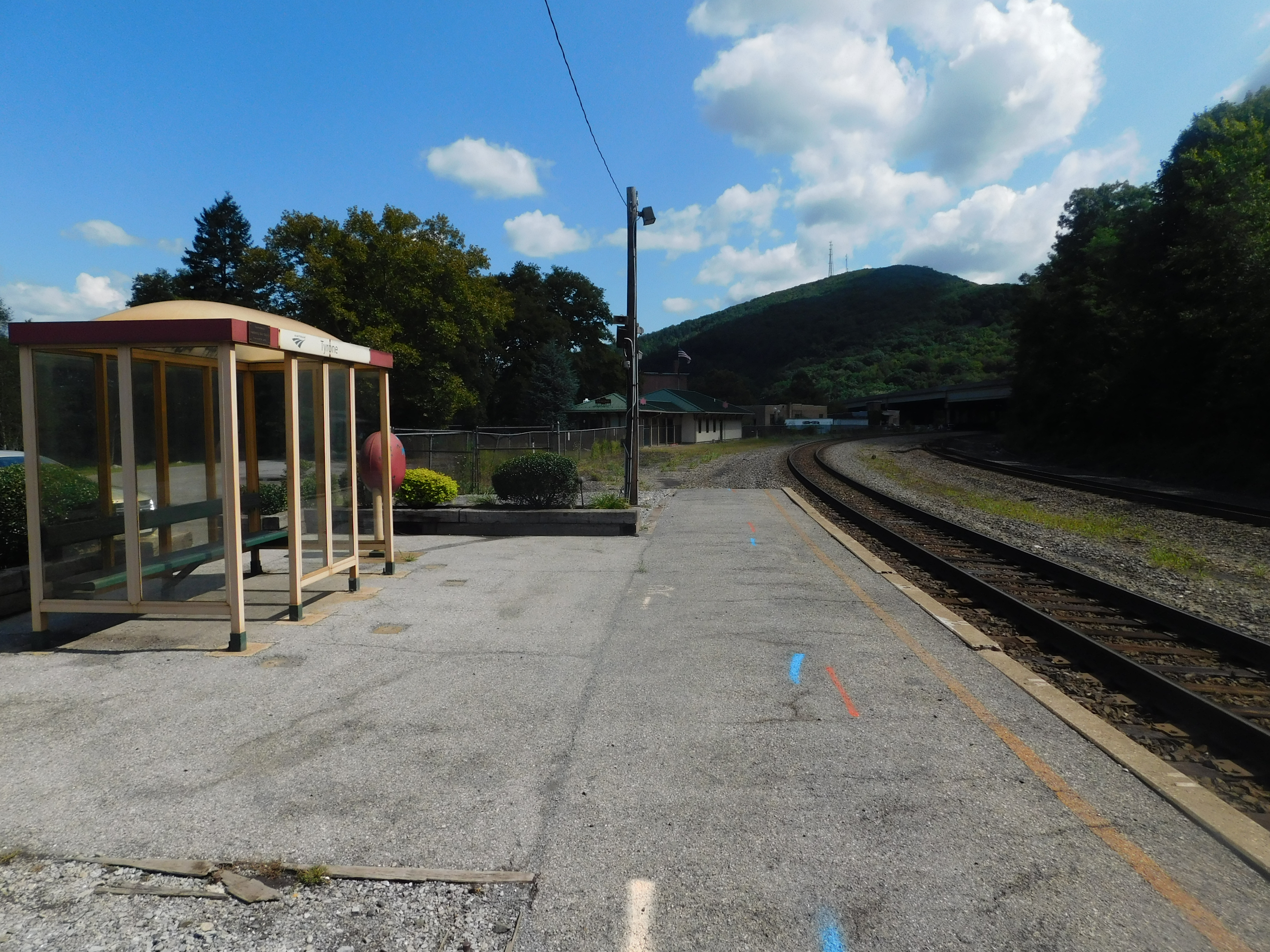
- Tyrone station in August 2018

General information
- Location: Pennsylvania Avenue and West 10th Street; Tyrone, Pennsylvania; United States
- Coordinates: 40°40′8″N 78°14′20″W
- Owner: Amtrak
- Line: NS Pittsburgh Line (Keystone Corridor)
- Platforms: 1 side platform
- Tracks: 2
- Connections: Greyhound Lines

Construction
- Parking: Yes
- Accessible: Yes

Other information
- Station code: Amtrak: TYR

History
- Opened: 1880
- Rebuilt: 2000

Key dates
- March 1968: Station building demolished

Passengers
- FY 2025: 4,416 (Amtrak)

Services
Preceding station	Amtrak	Following station
Altoona toward Pittsburgh	Pennsylvanian	Huntingdon toward New York
Former services
Preceding station	Amtrak	Following station
Altoona toward Chicago	Three Rivers 1995–2005	Huntingdon toward New York
Altoona toward Kansas City	National Limited	Huntingdon toward New York or Washington, D.C.
Preceding station	Pennsylvania Railroad	Following station
Tipton toward Chicago	Main Line	Birmingham toward New York or Exchange Place
Terminus	Clearfield Branch	Sandy Ridge toward Gramplan
Terminus	Tyrone – Lock Haven	Port Matilda toward Lock Haven
Location

Tyrone station is an Amtrak railway station in the southern part of Tyrone, Pennsylvania. It is served by the two daily round trips of the Pennsylvanian.

== History and notable features ==
A new railroad station building exists at the stop, but it is only currently used as a museum for the Tyrone Historical Society. There is no ticket office at this station. Due to the small number of passengers, Tyrone station is a flag stop.

Historically, there had been more Pennsylvania Railroad trains between Pittsburgh and Harrisburg, with many stopping at the station. Tyrone had been the departure point for trains on the 'Bald Eagle Valley Branch' to Lock Haven for Altoona–Williamsport trains via Tyrone and Lock Haven. The last Altoona–Lock Haven train was between August 1950 and 1951.

Greyhound has an intercity bus stop less than 1/4 mile (0.40 km) north of the station, at 20 West 10th Street.
