= Johnstown station =

Railway station in Johnstown, Pennsylvania, United States

Johnstown, PA
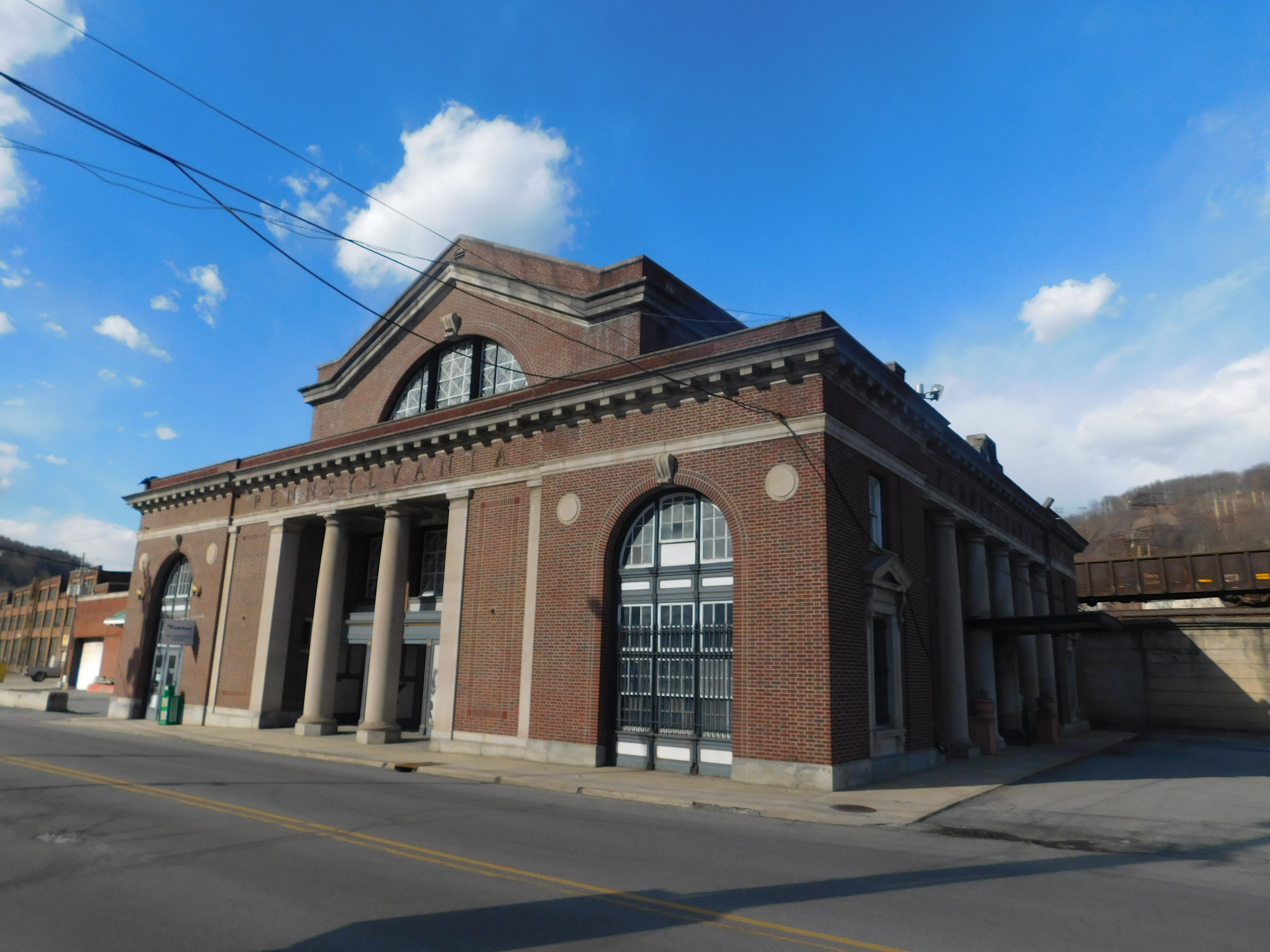
- The former Pennsylvania Railroad station in Johnstown, now serving as the main entrance for the Amtrak station

General information
- Location: 47 Walnut Street; Johnstown, Pennsylvania; United States
- Coordinates: 40°19′47″N 78°55′20″W
- Owner: Johnstown Area Heritage Association
- Line: NS Pittsburgh Line (Keystone Corridor)
- Platforms: 1 island platform
- Tracks: 2
- Connections: CamTran: 16, 18; Greyhound

Construction
- Accessible: Yes

Other information
- Station code: Amtrak: JST

History
- Opened: 1916
- Rebuilt: 1985, 2022 (planned)

Passengers
- FY 2025: 20,436 (Amtrak)

Services
Preceding station	Amtrak	Following station
Latrobe toward Pittsburgh	Pennsylvanian	Altoona toward New York
Former services
Preceding station	Amtrak	Following station
Latrobe toward Chicago	Three Rivers 1995–2005	Altoona toward New York
Greensburg toward Chicago	Broadway Limited Until 1995	Altoona toward New York
Latrobe toward Pittsburgh	Fort Pitt 1981–1983	Altoona Terminus
Latrobe toward Kansas City	National Limited 1971–1979	Altoona toward New York or Washington, D.C.
Preceding station	Pennsylvania Railroad	Following station
Seward toward Chicago	Main Line	Conemaugh toward New York or Exchange Place
Location

Johnstown station is an Amtrak intercity rail station in Johnstown, Pennsylvania, United States. The station is north of downtown Johnstown across the Little Conemaugh River. It is served by the two daily round trips of the Pennsylvanian.

== History ==
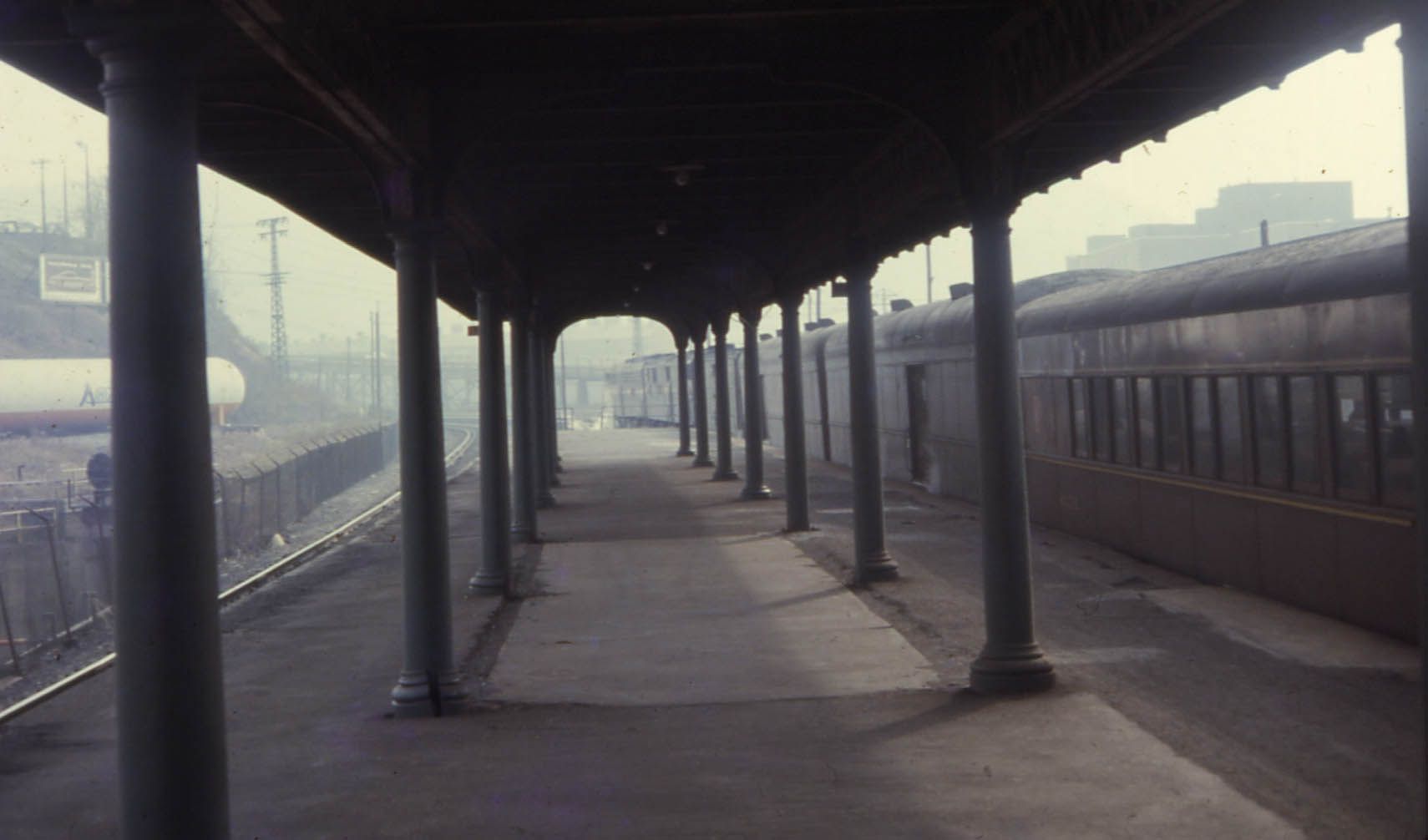
The station platform in 1967

The station building was designed by Kenneth MacKenzie Murchison for the Pennsylvania Railroad and built in 1916. Amtrak took over intercity passenger service in 1971. The cancellation of the Three Rivers in 2005 (leaving just the Pennsylvanian) marked the first time in Johnstown's railway history that the town was served by just a single daily passenger train.

The station had a high level platform until 1981, at which point it was removed for freight train clearances.

In November 2021, Amtrak announced plans for a renovation of the station, then expected to begin in October 2022. The work will include replacement of the existing island platform and headhouse with an accessible platform and headhouse with an elevator, filling of the existing baggage tunnel, and track work. As of June 2025, construction is expected to last from late 2026 to late 2028.
