= Harrisburg Transportation Center =

Intermodal station in Harrisburg, Pennsylvania

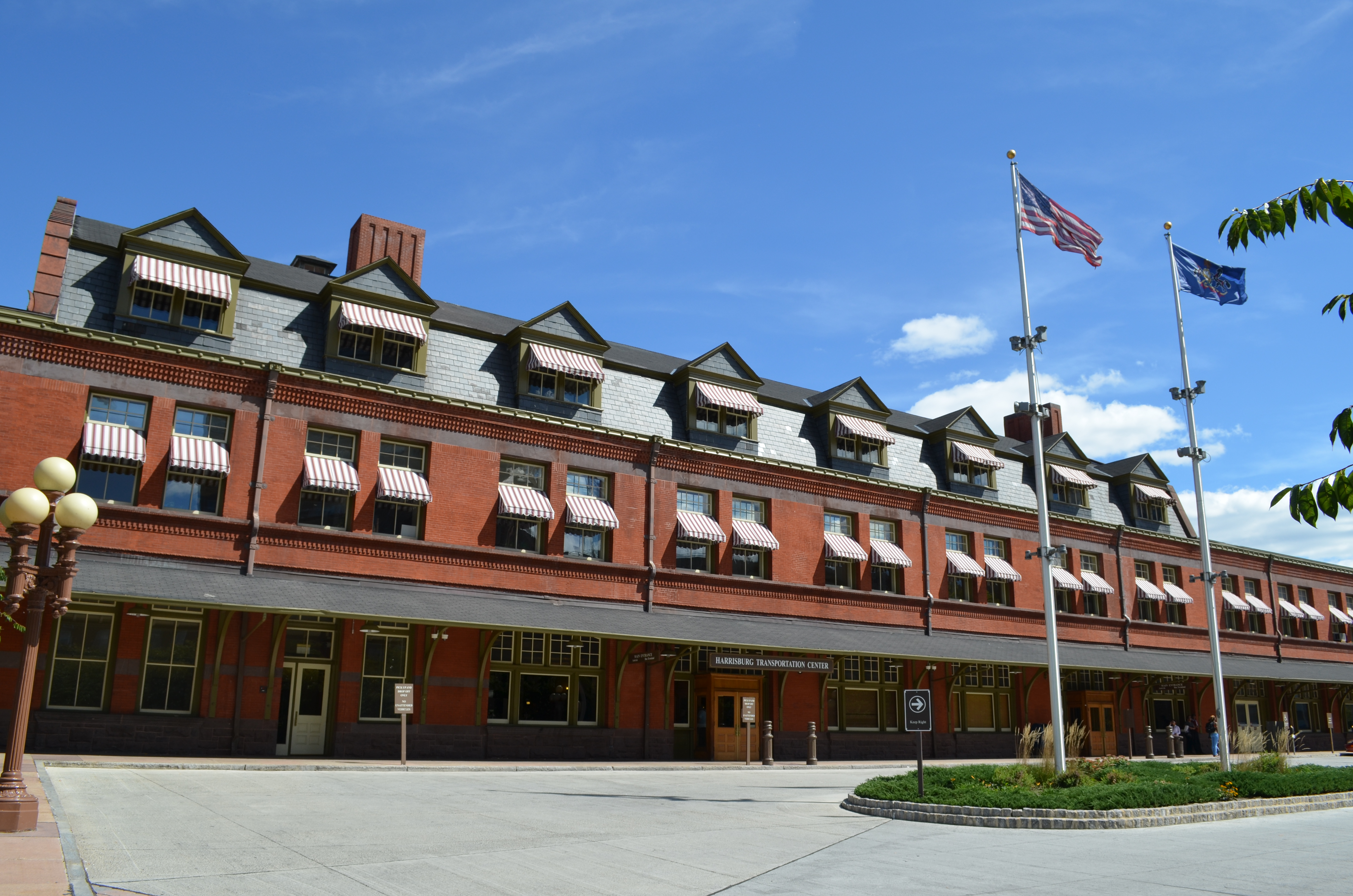
- Harrisburg Transportation Station in September 2012

General information
- Location: 4th and Chestnut streets Harrisburg, Pennsylvania; United States
- Coordinates: 40°15′43″N 76°52′40″W
- Owner: Amtrak
- Lines: Amtrak Philadelphia to Harrisburg Main Line; NS Pittsburgh Line (Keystone Corridor)
- Platforms: 4 island platforms
- Tracks: 8
- Connections: Capital Area Transit; FlixBus; Fullington Trailways; Greyhound Lines; Lebanon Transit; Rabbit Transit

Construction
- Parking: Metered
- Cycle facilities: Racks
- Accessible: Yes
- Architectural style: Colonial Revival

Other information
- Station code: Amtrak: HAR
- IATA code: ZUG

History
- Opened: 1887
- Rebuilt: 1905, 1986
- Electrified: January 15, 1938

Passengers
- FY 2025: 357,524 annually (Amtrak)

Services
Preceding station	Amtrak	Following station
Terminus	Keystone Service	Middletown toward New York
Lewistown toward Pittsburgh	Pennsylvanian	Elizabethtown toward New York
Former services
Preceding station	Amtrak	Following station
Lewistown toward Chicago	Three Rivers 1995–2005	Lancaster toward New York
Lewistown toward Chicago	Broadway Limited Until 1995	Lancaster toward New York
Lewistown toward Kansas City	National Limited	Elizabethtown toward New York
Lewistown toward Kansas City	National Limited	Baltimore toward Washington, D.C.
Preceding station	Pennsylvania Railroad	Following station
Maclay Street toward Chicago	Main Line	Steelton toward New York or Exchange Place
Dauphin toward Erie	Erie – Harrisburg	Terminus
Maclay Street toward Canandaigua	Northern Central Railway; Susquehanna & Elmira Division	Terminus
Lemoyne toward Winchester	Winchester – Harrisburg	Terminus
Terminus	Northern Central Railway; Baltimore Division	New Cumberland toward Calvert Street

U.S. National Register of Historic Places
- Official name: Harrisburg Central Railroad Station and Trainshed
- Designated: June 11, 1975
- Reference no.: 75001638

U.S. National Historic Landmark
- Designated: December 8, 1976
Location

The Harrisburg Transportation Center (HTC, formerly Pennsylvania Station, Harrisburg or Harrisburg Central Railroad Station) is a railway station and transportation hub in Harrisburg, Pennsylvania. It is located on the eastern edge of Downtown Harrisburg between the intersections of Aberdeen and Market streets and 4th and Chestnut streets.

The station is the primary hub for passenger rail and intercity bus services in the Harrisburg metropolitan area and South Central Pennsylvania.

== Building usage ==
The building is owned by Amtrak and managed and operated by the Harrisburg Redevelopment Authority. One of the station's tracks features a preserved locomotive, Pennsylvania Railroad 4859, on display.

== Service ==
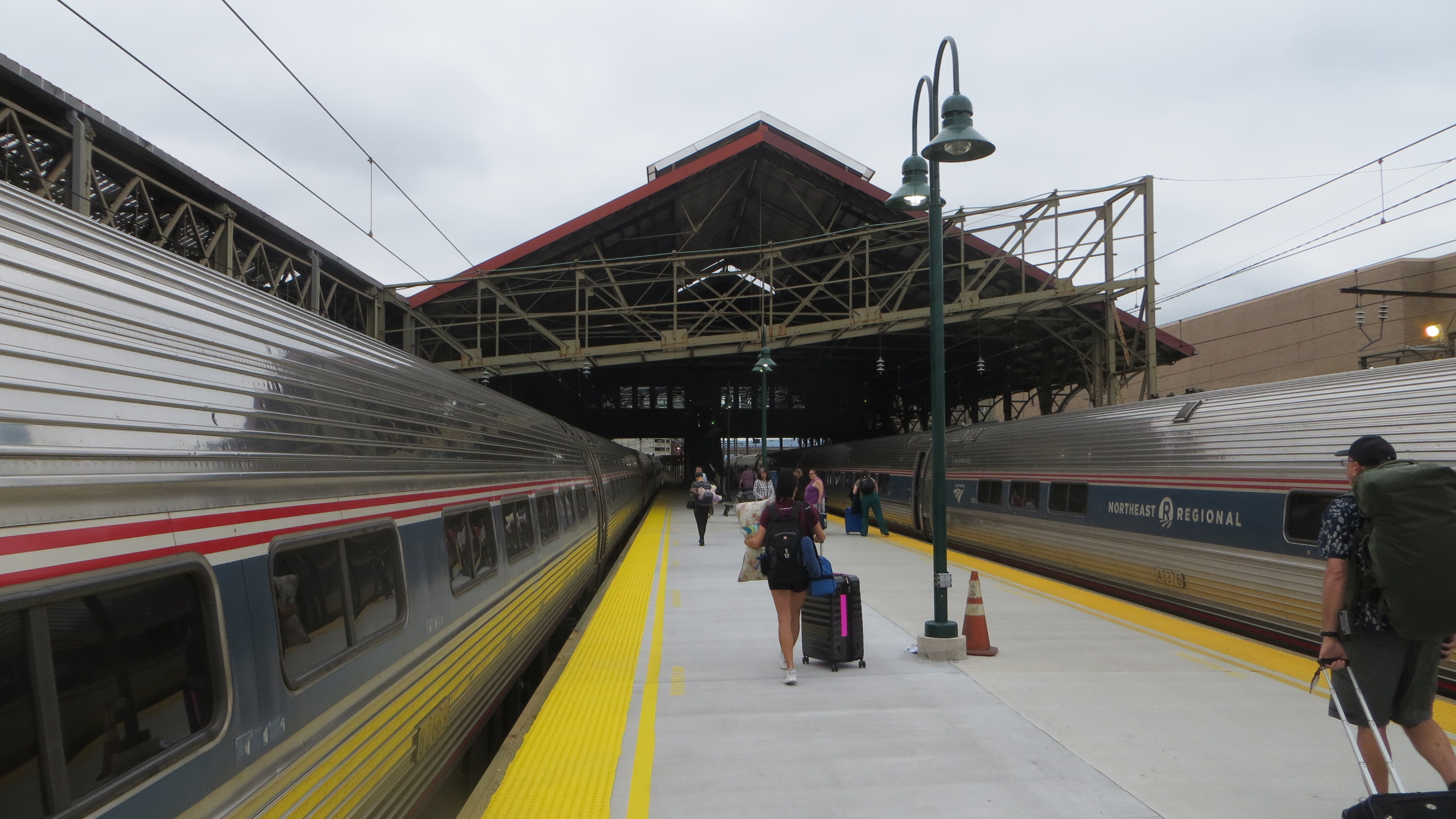
Train platform with a Keystone Service train on the left and the Pennsylvanian on the right

Amtrak provides service to the station via the Keystone Service and Pennsylvanian routes, which operate along the Keystone Corridor and Northeast Corridor. The Harrisburg Transportation Center is the western terminus of the Keystone Service. In Fiscal Year 2018, Harrisburg was the third busiest Amtrak station in Pennsylvania and 22nd busiest in the United States.

Intercity bus service to the station is operated by Greyhound Lines, FlixBus and Fullington Trailways. It is a hub for Capital Area Transit (CAT) local bus service. Rabbit Transit, Lebanon Transit, and R & J Transportation have stops at or near the station.

== History ==
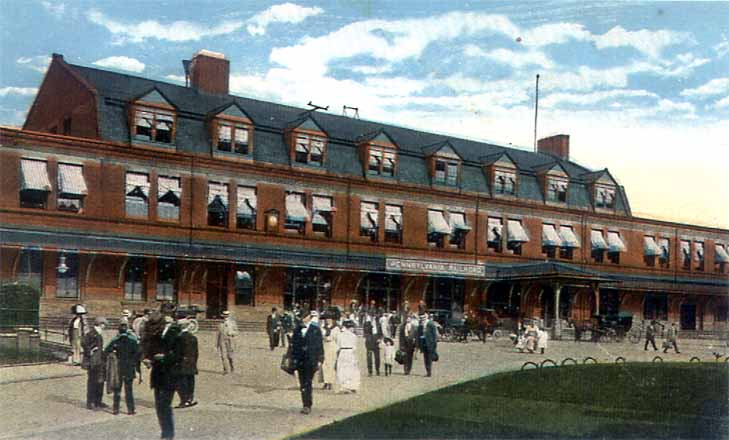
The station circa 1900

The current station is the third on the site. The first two stations were shared by the Pennsylvania Railroad (PRR), Reading Railroad, Northern Central Railway (NCR), and the Cumberland Valley Railroad (CVR). The third and current station excluded the Reading Railroad, which built its own station in 1856, and the CVR maintained a small depot adjoining the much larger NCR/PRR station. The CVR station was razed sometime in the late 1960s or early 1970s. The Reading Railroad discontinued passenger service into its Harrisburg station in the 1950s and its station was torn down in the early 1960s to make room for a new post office; however, it continued passenger service on the Queen of the Valley. The last northbound train bound for Sunbury, Williamsport and Buffalo was the Penn Central's unnamed successor to the Buffalo Day Express, ending in 1971.

The last Erie-bound PRR trains were in 1965 before the Northern Express and Southern Express were diverted to Buffalo.

The current station was built by PRR in 1887 and significantly rebuilt with its distinctive barn roof in 1905 following a serious fire in 1904.

It was listed on the National Register of Historic Places in 1975, and is also designated as a National Historic Landmark. The station is one of the few railway stations in the United States that still has a train shed above the tracks. It also has a red brick exterior, unlike many of the still-used U.S. railway stations built slightly later in the early 1900s that have white stone facing, including 30th Street Station in Philadelphia and Washington Union Station in Washington, D.C.
