= Huntingdon station (Amtrak) =

Railway station in Pennsylvania

Huntingdon, PA
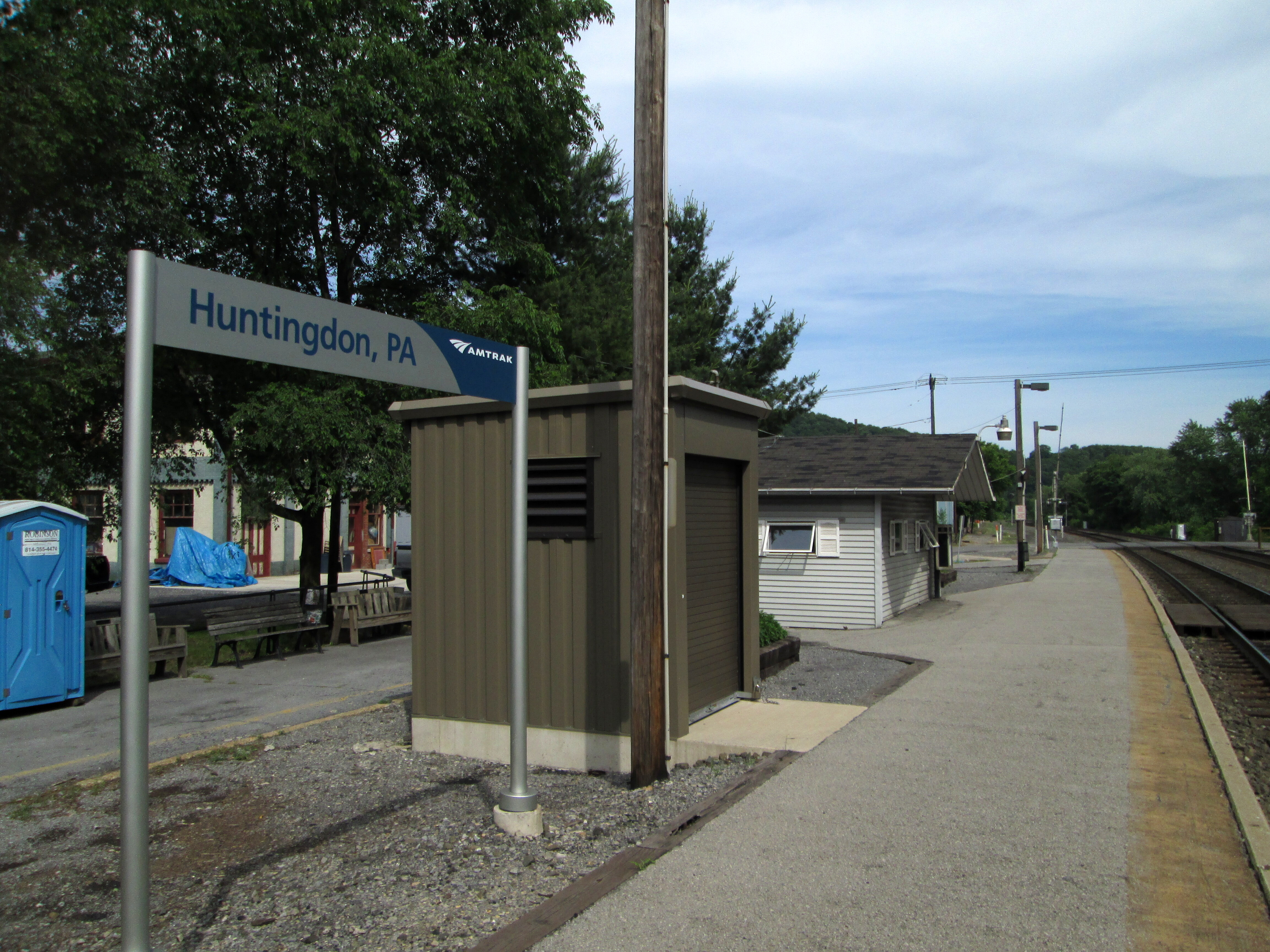
- Huntingdon station in 2013

General information
- Location: Fourth and Allegheny Streets; Huntingdon, Pennsylvania; United States
- Coordinates: 40°29′2″N 78°0′40″W
- Owner: Amtrak
- Line: NS Pittsburgh Line (Keystone Corridor)
- Platforms: 1 side platform
- Tracks: 2

Construction
- Parking: Yes
- Accessible: Yes

Other information
- Station code: Amtrak: HGD

History
- Opened: 1872

Passengers
- FY 2025: 5,586 (Amtrak)

Services
Preceding station	Amtrak	Following station
Tyrone toward Pittsburgh	Pennsylvanian	Lewistown toward New York
Former services
Preceding station	Amtrak	Following station
Tyrone toward Chicago	Three Rivers 1995–2005	Lewistown toward New York
Altoona toward Chicago	Broadway Limited Until 1995	Lewistown toward New York
Tyrone toward Kansas City	National Limited	Lewistown toward New York or Washington, D.C.
Preceding station	Pennsylvania Railroad	Following station
Warrior Ridge toward Chicago	Main Line	Ardenheim toward New York or Exchange Place
Petersburg toward Altoona	Petersburg Branch	Terminus
Location

Huntingdon station is an Amtrak railway station in Huntingdon, Pennsylvania. The station is situated at the south end of the borough, along one of the major streets into Huntingdon (4th Street), just north of the Juniata River. It is served by the two daily round trips of the Pennsylvanian.

== History ==
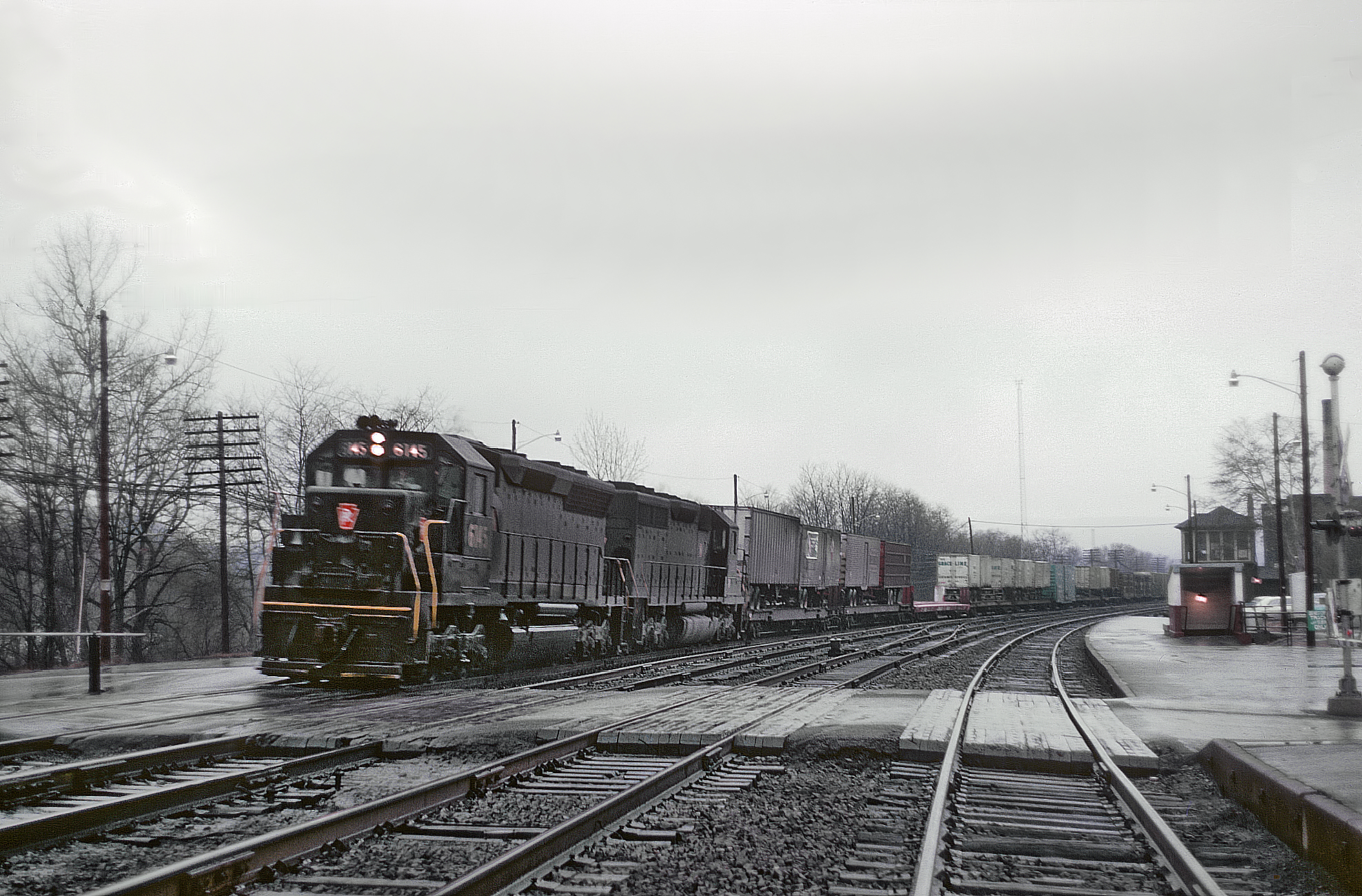
A freight train at the station in 1969

The station was originally built by the Pennsylvania Railroad in 1872, and shared service with the Huntingdon and Broad Top Mountain Railroad, which had a station across the tracks. The station house was closed by PRR in 1965, and is currently a local business.

A shack-like, but structurally sound building, it also contained a signal house, which for a time served as a rail museum but now houses the Huntingdon County Chamber of Commerce. Efforts to save the former H&BTM station failed when it was demolished in 2001.

Huntingdon is currently only served by Amtrak's Pennsylvanian. Until 2005, Huntingdon was served by the Three Rivers (a replacement service for the Broadway Limited), an extended version of the Pennsylvanian that terminated in Chicago.

Amtrak completed a $3.5 million renovation of the station in 2026. It included an accessible platform and a new brick shelter.
