= Lewistown station =

Railway station in Lewistown, Pennsylvania

Lewistown, PA
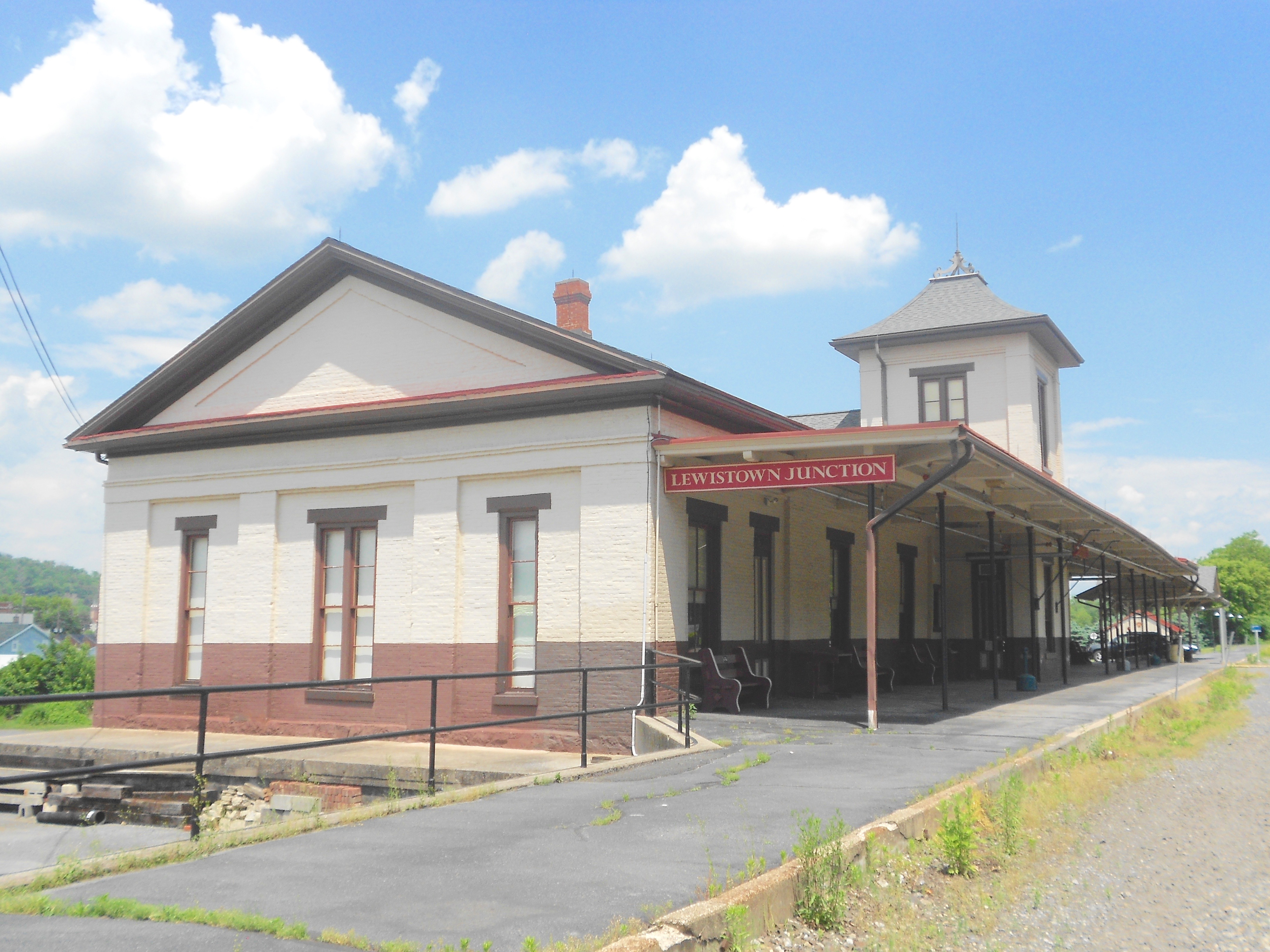
- Lewistown station in 2016

General information
- Location: 150 Helen Street; Lewistown, Pennsylvania; United States
- Coordinates: 40.5882°N 77.5803°W
- Owner: Pennsylvania Railroad Technical & Historical Society
- Line: NS Pittsburgh Line (Keystone Corridor)
- Platforms: 1 side platform
- Tracks: 2

Construction
- Parking: Yes
- Accessible: Yes

Other information
- Station code: Amtrak: LEW

History
- Opened: 1849
- Rebuilt: 1985–1999
- Former names: Lewistown Junction

Passengers
- FY 2025: 12,494 (Amtrak)

Services
Preceding station	Amtrak	Following station
Huntingdon toward Pittsburgh	Pennsylvanian	Harrisburg toward New York
Former services
Preceding station	Amtrak	Following station
Huntingdon toward Chicago	Three Rivers 1995–2005	Harrisburg toward New York
Huntingdon toward Chicago	Broadway Limited Until 1995	Harrisburg toward New York
Huntingdon toward Kansas City	National Limited	Harrisburg toward New York or Washington, D.C.
Preceding station	Pennsylvania Railroad	Following station
Granville toward Chicago	Main Line	Shawnee toward New York or Exchange Place
Location

Lewistown station (also known as Lewistown Junction) is an Amtrak railway station on Pennsylvania Route 103 in southern Lewistown, Pennsylvania. It is served by the two daily round trips of the Pennsylvanian.

== History ==
The Broadway Limited at Lewistown in 1991

The station building is the oldest structure built by the Pennsylvania Railroad which is still standing. The building was constructed from 1848 to 1849 as the freight station, with a nearby hotel serving as the passenger depot. Train service to Lewistown from Harrisburg started in September 1849. The hotel's additional use as the passenger station ended in 1868 after an expansion had been made to the existing freight station. The hotel remained in operation along with a restaurant, and a Railway Express Agency. That building was demolished in the 1950s. "J" Tower, which was added in the 1870s as a two-story brick tower within the depot, was removed in the mid-1950s. During restoration of the depot, a replica of "J" Tower was installed into the building in the mid-1990s.

After the merger of the Pennsylvania and New York Central Railroads on February 1, 1968, ownership transferred to Penn Central. When Amtrak took over passenger train operations on May 1, 1971, ownership of the station was transferred to Amtrak. Amtrak closed the ticket office in 1977. Amtrak sold the station and surrounding land to the Pennsylvania Railroad Technical and Historical Society in October 1985, with allowances to keep Lewistown as a stop for their daily passenger trains.

In December 2019, the Mifflin County Planning Commission announced a two-phase transportation study on the improvements needed to the station and infrastructure, and the transportation and traffic flow.

== Bibliography ==
- Yanosey, Robert (2010). Pennsylvania Railroad Facilities in Color: Volume 8 Allegheny Division: Banks to Antis. Scotch Plains, NJ: Morning Sun Books. ISBN 978-1582482897.
