= Cove, Pennsylvania =

Unincorporated community in Pennsylvania, US

Coordinates: 40°21′17″N 76°58′40″W

Cove is an unincorporated community in Perry County, Pennsylvania, United States. It is a former borough and a railway junction interchanging point with the Norfolk Southern Pittsburgh Line. A post office existed here from 1870 to 1967.
