= Pittsburgh Line =

Norfolk Southern rail line

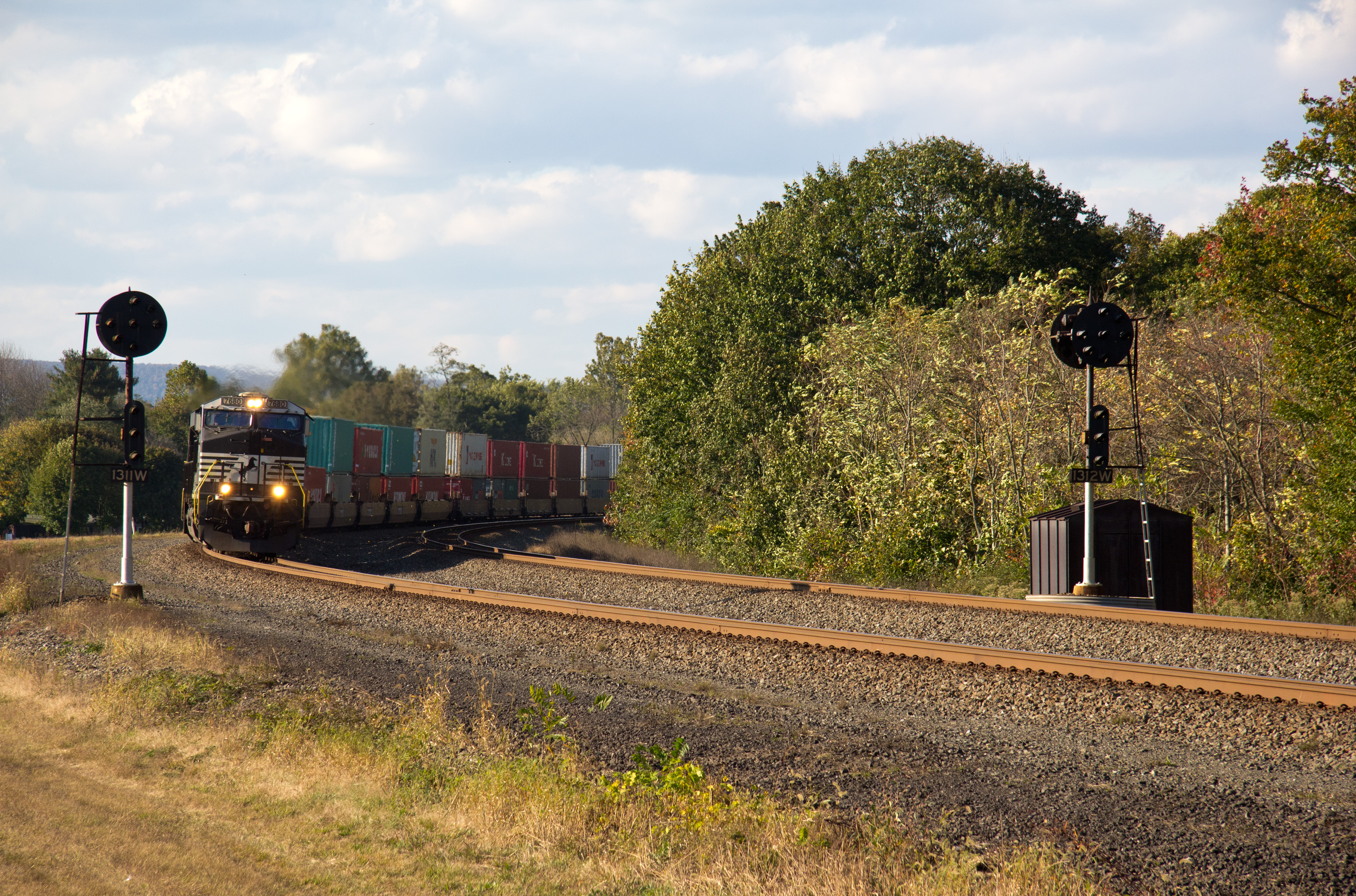
- Eastbound intermodal train on the Pittsburgh Line in Newport, Pennsylvania

Overview
- Status: Operational
- Owner: Norfolk Southern
- Locale: Western and central Pennsylvania
- Termini: Pittsburgh (CP-West Pitt); Harrisburg (CP-Harrisburg)

Service
- Type: Freight rail and passenger rail
- Operator(s): Norfolk Southern, Amtrak

Technical
- Line length: 248 mi (399 km)
- Number of tracks: 2–4
- Track gauge: 4 ft 8 1/2 in (1,435 mm) standard gauge

The Pittsburgh Line is a rail line owned and operated by the Norfolk Southern Railway in the U.S. state of Pennsylvania. The line spans 248 miles (399 km) between its namesake city of Pittsburgh in the western part of the state and Harrisburg in the central region. It forms part of the longer Keystone Corridor, which continues east to Philadelphia via Amtrak's Philadelphia to Harrisburg Main Line.

The Pittsburgh Line is Norfolk Southern's primary east–west artery through its Pittsburgh and Harrisburg divisions. Along its route, the line crosses the Allegheny Mountains via the Gallitzin Tunnels west of Altoona and the Horseshoe Curve. At its eastern end, it connects with the Harrisburg Line, providing access to Reading and Philadelphia. At its western end, it connects with the Fort Wayne Line toward Conway, Pennsylvania, linking to points west in Ohio and Indiana.

The line is one of Norfolk Southern's busiest freight corridors, with approximately 50 to 70 trains daily, and serves as a major route for intermodal traffic between the Northeast and the rail hubs in Chicago.

== History ==
The Pittsburgh Line was originally owned by the Pennsylvania Railroad (PRR). It began as two rail lines, the Middle Division Main Line which was part of the PRR Middle Division and the Pittsburgh Division Main Line which was part of the PRR Pittsburgh Division. The Pennsylvania Railroad combined the Middle Division Main Line and the Pittsburgh Division Main Line into one rail line, forming the Pittsburgh Line, though at the time the Pittsburgh Line was not referred to by that name. At the same time the Middle Division and the Pittsburgh Division were also combined.

The Pennsylvania Railroad eventually combined the merged Middle Division/Pittsburgh Division Main Line with their main rail line to Philadelphia, forming the Main Line of the Pennsylvania Railroad (now known as the Keystone Corridor). The Main Line served as the PRR's primary route across Pennsylvania, continuing its existence through the Penn Central years and the early years of Conrail.

Conrail broke the PRR Main Line into two rail lines again, reestablishing the Pittsburgh Line and the PRR Philadelphia main line which eventually became known as the Philadelphia to Harrisburg Main Line, now under the ownership of Amtrak. The Pittsburgh Line received its current name in the 1980s under Conrail.

The Pittsburgh Line was passed down to the Norfolk Southern Railway in 1999 during the breakup of Conrail between Norfolk Southern and CSX Transportation.

== Major terminals ==
The Pittsburgh Line is marked with three major freight terminals at its ends. On its east end, Harrisburg Terminal handles the bulk of the railroad's intermodal traffic, with a handful of intermodal trains originating and terminating there. Across the Susquehanna River in Enola is Norfolk Southern's major freight terminal in the Greater Harrisburg area: Enola Yard, which handles almost all manifest freight traffic that passes through the area. Many of the Pittsburgh Line's manifest freight trains originate or terminate here, with a few continuing south to Baltimore and points east, while others bypass Enola and cross the Rockville Bridge over the Susquehanna to Harrisburg bound for Allentown and points east.

On its west end, the Pittsburgh Line becomes the Fort Wayne Line after crossing the Allegheny River bridge, where trains travel 23 miles (37 km) to reach Conway Yard. Conway is the hub of activity in Western Pennsylvania, where many trains originate and terminate, with many of those trains being the same freight trains that originate and terminate at Enola Yard, respectively. Conway is the hub of operations for Norfolk Southern in the Greater Pittsburgh area, featuring a hump yard and a crew change point for virtually all Pittsburgh and Fort Wayne Line trains.

== Routing ==
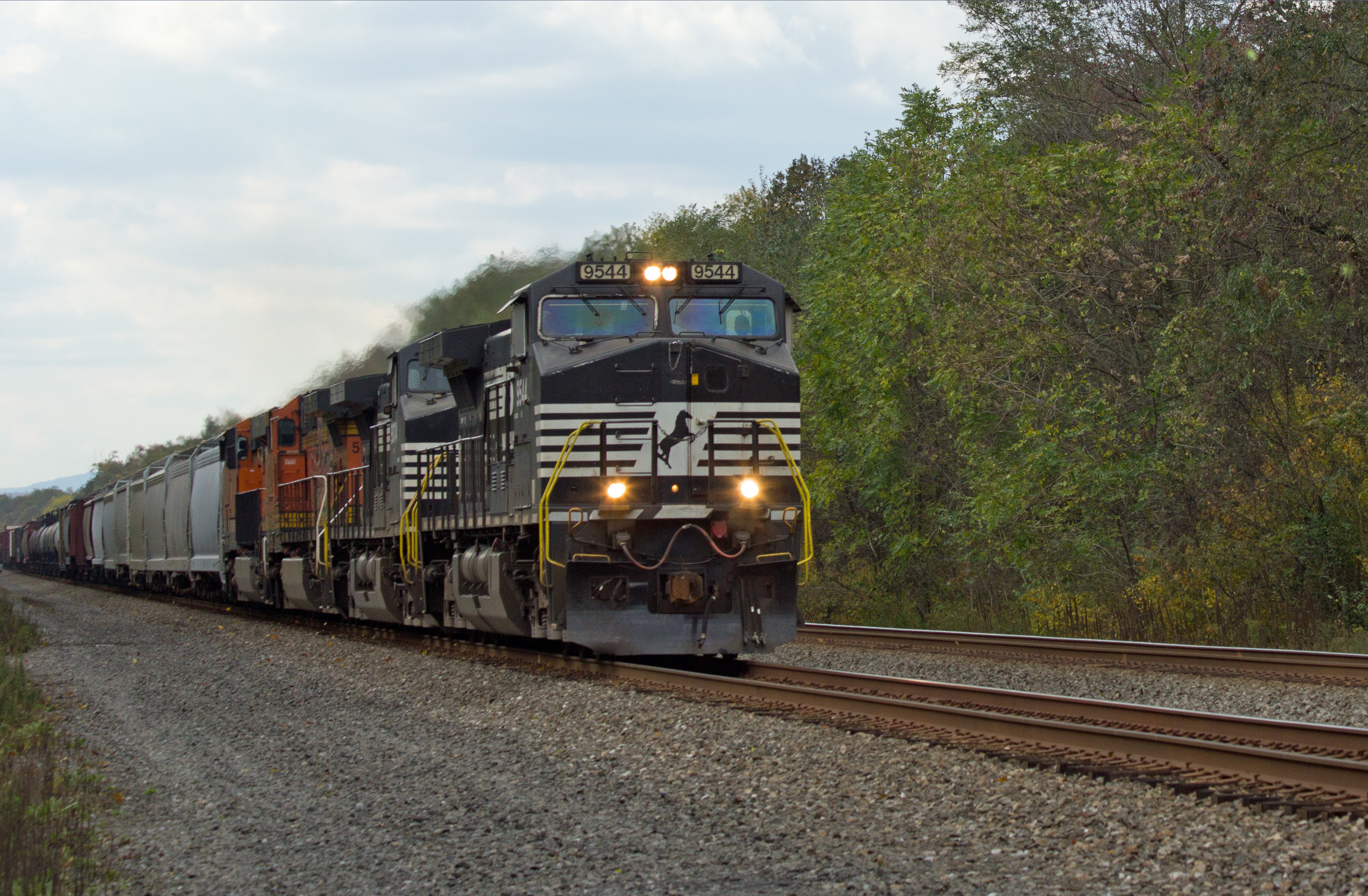
Two Norfolk Southern and two BNSF locomotives lead a manifest between Port Royal and Millerstown

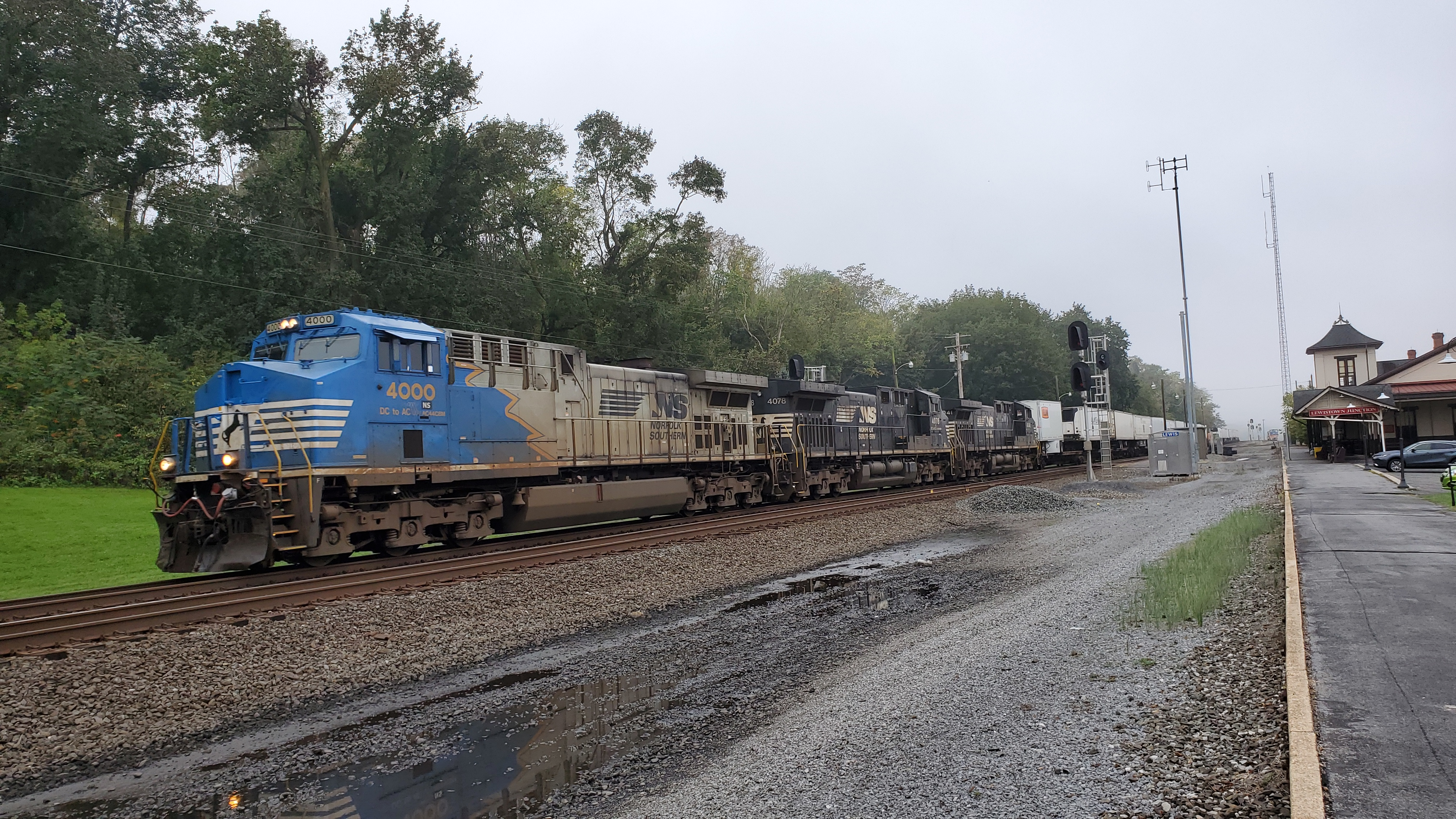
A trio of GE AC44C6Ms lead an eastbound intermodal at Lewistown station in 2021. Of note is AC44C6M #4000, one of only a few AC44C6Ms to wear a unique paint scheme and one of only two to wear the Sonic Bonnet scheme, the other being #4001.

From Harrisburg/Enola, the railroad travels northwest following the path of the Susquehanna River parallel to U.S. Route 11/15, passing through the communities of Marysville, Cove, and Duncannon. At Duncannon, the Pittsburgh Line leaves the Susquehanna and follows the path of the smaller Juniata River, which it will follow for much of its length to Altoona. This segment is unofficially dubbed the "Middle Division", after the Pittsburgh Line's predecessor, the Middle Division Main Line which was part of the Pennsylvania Railroad (PRR) Middle Division. U.S. Route 22 follows the route for much of its length here. The line interchanges with the Juniata Valley Railroad at Lewistown, and with the Nittany and Bald Eagle Railroad at Tyrone. Once at Altoona, the railroad arrives at the base of the Allegheny Mountain Front, which it must climb to reach Johnstown and Pittsburgh.

Altoona is the site of the Norfolk Southern (NS)'s Juniata Shops, the largest locomotive repair facility on the NS system. Originally constructed by the PRR in 1850, this large complex of shops is what gave the city of Altoona its worth and structure.

Leaving Altoona, the railroad travels at a 1.76% grade up the east slope of the Alleghenies, negotiating the famous Horseshoe Curve during that climb. Past the curve, the Pittsburgh Line continues to climb a grade of 1.86% to the small town of Gallitzin, where the mainline reaches the top of its climb at 2,167 feet (661 m) above sea level, the total westward climb from Altoona amounting to 12 miles (19 km). From there, the railroads descends the Alleghenies' west slope to Johnstown, a total distance of about 25 miles (40 km). From Johnstown, the Pittsburgh Line follows the path of the Conemaugh River on both of its banks to Conpit Junction, where the line divides. Westbound and lighter eastbound trains take the again-graded Pittsburgh Line west towards Pittsburgh, while heavier eastbound trains take the Conemaugh Line on an easier routing from Pittsburgh, which continues to follow the Conemaugh River. The Conemaugh Line joins back in with the Pittsburgh Line at CP-PENN in Pittsburgh. The line's westernmost end is at CP-WEST PITT by Pittsburgh's Amtrak station, where it crosses the Allegheny River to form the Fort Wayne Line.

== Allegheny Mountains and Horseshoe Curve ==
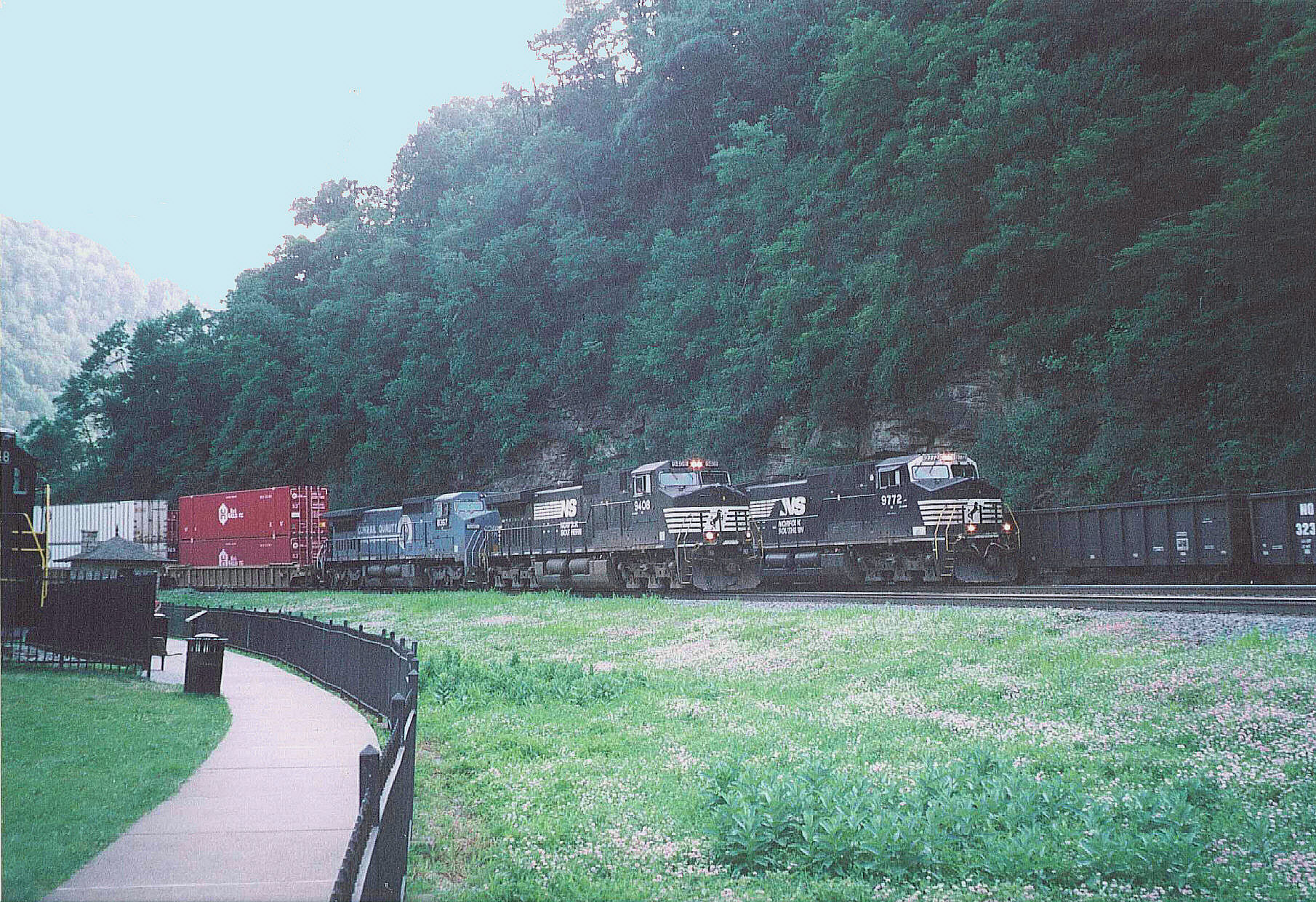
Three Norfolk Southern freight trains pass each other on the Horseshoe Curve in 2006.

Until reaching Altoona, the Pittsburgh Line is a double-track mainline from Duncannon. Once at Altoona, a third track is added for the climb up the Allegheny Mountains. The line goes back to two at Conpit Junction, where the Conemaugh Line remains a single-track route.

On the east slope of the Alleghenies, the tracks traverse remote mountainous terrain at a grade of about 1.8%. Roughly halfway up the westward ascent lies the Horseshoe Curve. Originally constructed by the PRR in 1854, the 220-degree curve was the solution for the railroad to gain enough elevation around a valley to reach the higher land across to continue west. Constructed mainly by immigrants, the curve was built by cutting into the hillside around Kittanning Point and filling in the necessary places for the railroad right-of-way to be laid. Today, the curve functions as a tourist attraction for both railroad enthusiasts and the rest of the public, and is a magnet for drawing visitors from all over the globe. It is listed on the National Register of Historic Places, and boasts a visitors park in the apex of the curve adjacent to the Pittsburgh Line tracks, as well as a visitors center and gift shop.

Past the curve, the Pittsburgh Line continues west to Gallitzin, passing through MG Interlocking a mile west of Horseshoe Curve, whose old PRR interlocking tower is also on the historic register, though off-limits to the public. East of Gallitzin, the railroad passes through Bennington Curve, the site of a PRR passenger wreck in 1947 killing 16 people and injuring over 100. Past Bennington Curve at a railroad timetable station called "SF", the three tracks split. Tracks 2 (bi-directional) and 3 (westward) continue on towards Gallitzin at their same ascent, while Track 1 (eastward) diverges up a 2.46% grade known as "The Slide", which is a downhill-only track restricting trains to traveling no more than 12 miles per hour (19 km/h) over its steep grade. Both sets of main tracks pass through tunnels to exit and crest in the town of Gallitzin. Tracks 2 and 3 pass through the new Allegheny Tunnel, while Track 1 passes through the New Portage Tunnel. A third tunnel can be seen; the Gallitzin Tunnel, which used to house Track 3 before the Allegheny Tunnel was heightened and widened to house Tracks 2 and 3 as well as doublestack container traffic on intermodal trains in 1994. Upon its completion in 1995, the Gallitzin Tunnel was officially closed.

Past Gallitzin, the railroad passes through the small town of Cresson, where all of the Pittsburgh Line's tracks come back together. Here is also where a locomotive helper base is located, as well as interchange(s) with the RJ Corman Railroad.

Past Cresson, the railroad passes down the Alleghenies' west slope, through the towns of Lilly, Cassandra, Portage, Wilmore, Summerhill, South Fork, Mineral Point, Parkhill, and East Conemaugh before reaching Johnstown at the bottom of the mountain. South Fork is the junction of the South Fork Secondary, a coal route used to reach local mines in the area which generates a train or two a day bound for various destinations.

== Helpers ==
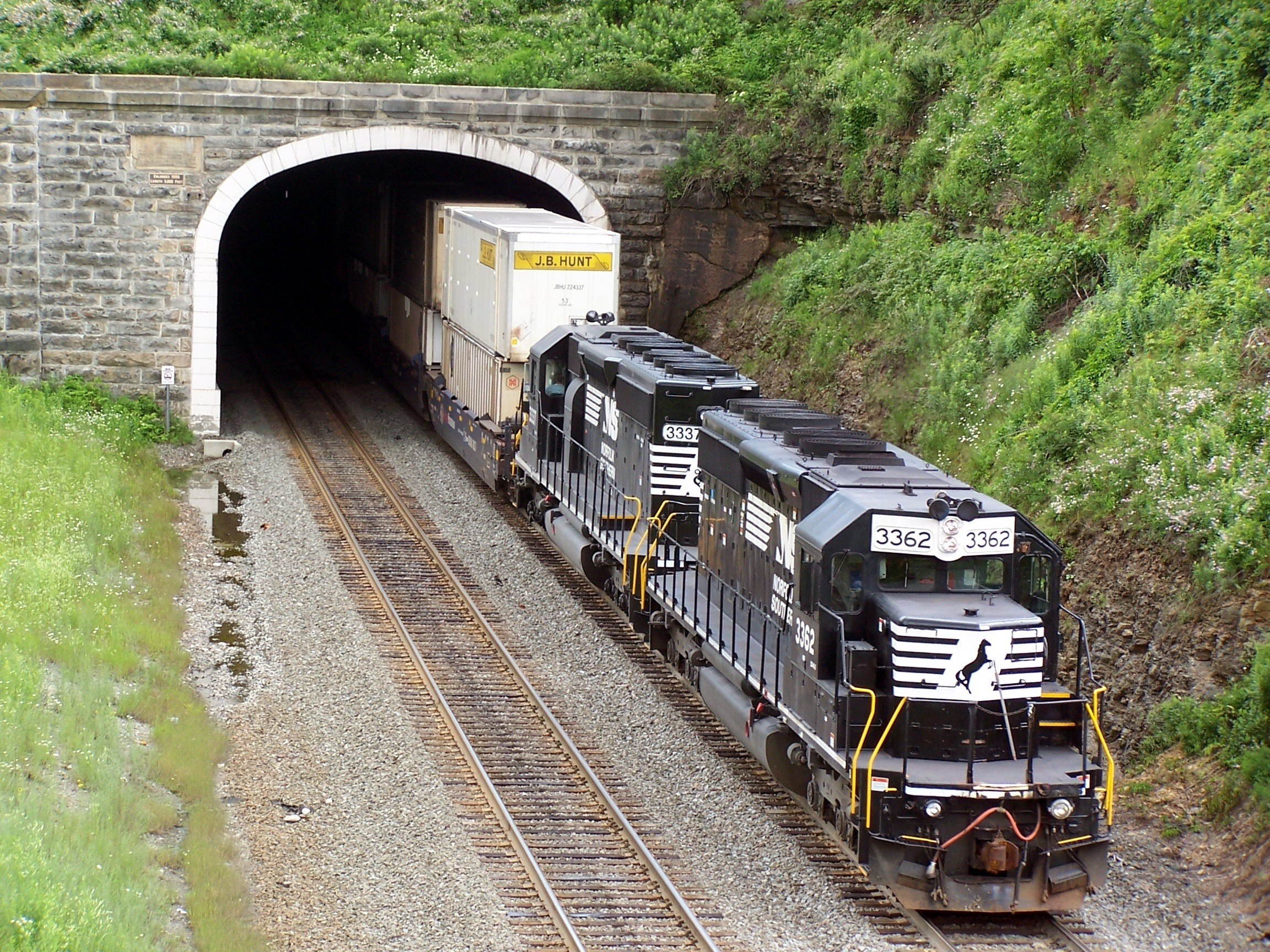
Helpers on the rear of an intermodal train entering the Gallitzin Tunnel

Helper locomotives are used by Norfolk Southern to assist heavy trains over mountainous portions of the Pittsburgh Line. Helper crews are mainly based in Altoona and Conemaugh/Johnstown, though some helpers are called as far away as Pittsburgh.

== Passenger operations ==
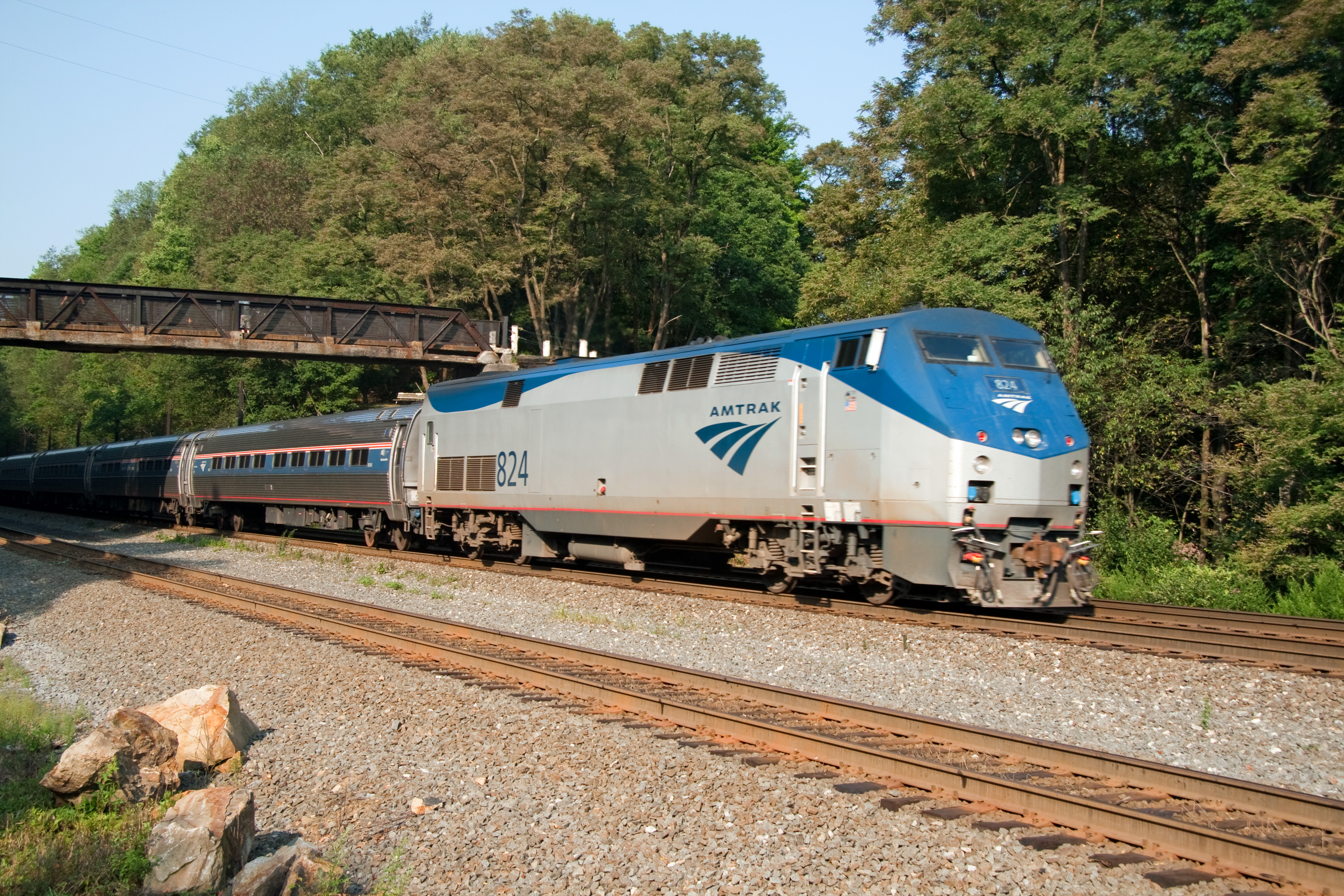
The eastbound Amtrak Pennsylvanian passes through Cassandra on the Pittsburgh Line

Today, Amtrak's Pennsylvanian is the only passenger service that remains in operation on the Pittsburgh Line, making stops at Harrisburg, Lewistown, Huntingdon, Tyrone, Altoona, Johnstown, Latrobe, Greensburg, and Pittsburgh.

In May 2013 the Commonwealth of Pennsylvania agreed to US$3.8 million in funding to subsidize the passenger line.

== See also ==
- Conemaugh Line, a low-grade alternate route between Johnstown and Pittsburgh
- Port Perry Branch, used (together with part of the Mon Line) as a high-clearance alternate route between Wilmerding and Pittsburgh
- List of Norfolk Southern Railway lines
