= Three Rivers (train) =

Former Amtrak passenger train between New York and Chicago via Pittsburgh

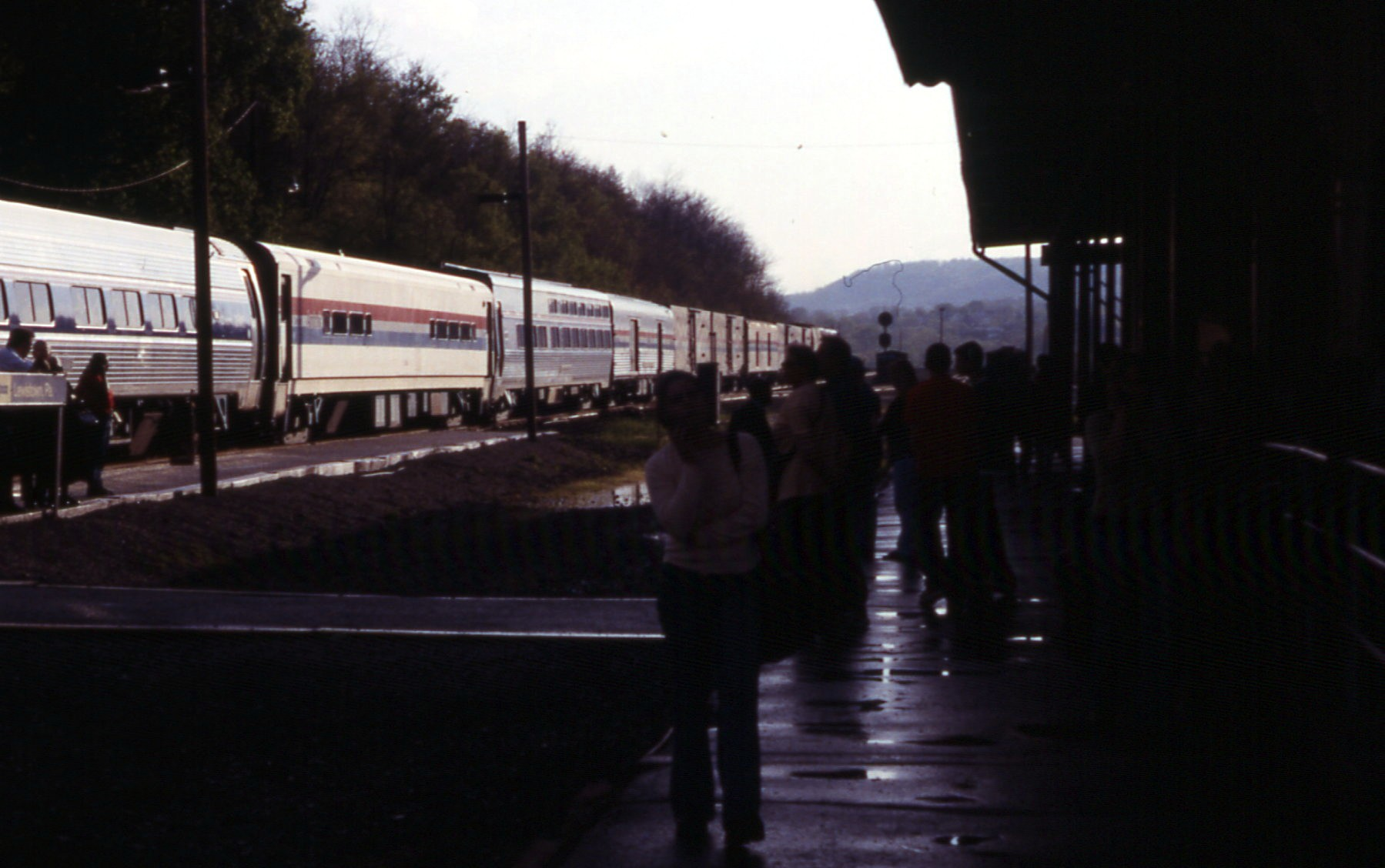
- The Three Rivers at Lewistown in 2002.

Overview
- Service type: Inter-city rail
- Status: Discontinued
- Locale: Northeastern United States; Midwestern United States
- Predecessor: Broadway Limited
- First service: September 10, 1995
- Last service: March 7, 2005
- Successor: Pennsylvanian
- Former operator: Amtrak

Route
- Termini: New York City; Chicago, Illinois
- Stops: 19
- Distance travelled: 908 miles (1,461 km)
- Average journey time: 19 hours 30 minutes
- Service frequency: Daily
- Train number: 40, 41

Technical
- Rolling stock: Amfleet coaches; Horizon or Amfleet dinettes; Viewliner or Heritage Fleet sleepers
- Track gauge: 4 ft 8 1/2 in (1,435 mm)
- Track owners: Amtrak; Conrail (until 1999); Norfolk Southern; CSXT

The Three Rivers was an Amtrak passenger train that ran daily between New York City and Chicago via Philadelphia, Pittsburgh, and Akron. It commenced on September 10, 1995, replacing the Broadway Limited, and ran until March 7, 2005, when Amtrak cancelled a contract with the United States Postal Service that was specific to the train.

== History ==
Amtrak began the Three Rivers on September 10, 1995, as a replacement for the discontinued Broadway Limited. The train originally ran between New York and Pittsburgh, extending a New York–Harrisburg Keystone Service train. Using train numbers 46/47, it exchanged mail cars with the Chicago–Washington, D.C. Capitol Limited in Pittsburgh, while through passengers disembarked and changed trains.

Through service began on February 1, 1996, by coupling two Three Rivers Amfleet coaches to the Superliner consist of the Capitol Limited. Passage between the single-level and double-level cars was facilitated by a transition dorm car.

Amtrak ended the switching operation on November 10, 1996, in favor of extending the Three Rivers to Chicago as an independent train. In doing so, they restored the Broadway Limited's numbers (40/41), albeit neither its full dining service nor its sleeping cars due to equipment shortages and an unfavorable schedule.

On April 1, 1999, Amtrak added a sleeping car to the Three Rivers, using four previously stored Heritage Fleet sleepers that they had restored for $250,000 since no Viewliners were available. The last standard 10-6 sleepers operated by Amtrak, they required a Federal Railroad Administration waiver to operate because of their direct-dump toilets. When the waiver expired in October 2001, Amtrak retired the Heritage sleepers and replaced them with Viewliners, which had since become available. It ceased on March 7, 2005, after Amtrak cancelled a contract with the United States Postal Service that was specific to the train.

== Route ==
The Pittsburgh–New York Three Rivers stopped at Pittsburgh, Greensburg, Johnstown, Altoona, Huntingdon, Lewistown, Harrisburg, Lancaster, Paoli, Philadelphia, Trenton, Newark and New York. With the extension to Chicago in 1996, service began to Hammond–Whiting and Nappanee. Other stops in Ohio were added as station improvements were funded: Youngstown (May 16, 1997), Fostoria (December 15, 1997) and Akron (August 10, 1998). Latrobe was added as a flag stop on May 17, 1998.

Highlights along the route included Horseshoe Curve near Altoona, Pennsylvania, and the Allegheny Mountains. The New York–Chicago trip took about 20 hours.

Service over the former route of the Three Rivers east of Pittsburgh is now provided by the Pennsylvanian. While its route west of Pittsburgh to Hammond–Whiting is no longer served by passenger trains, the Floridian still connects Pittsburgh and Chicago, albeit on a different route via Cleveland.

== Equipment ==
The Three Rivers used Amfleet coaches and either Amfleet or Horizon dinettes in addition to the later Heritage sleeper. At the height of Amtrak's experiment with mail and express business, a typical late 1990s Three Rivers had 4–6 passenger cars and upwards of 25 mail cars.
