= Lebanon Transit =

Public transportation system in Pennsylvania, US

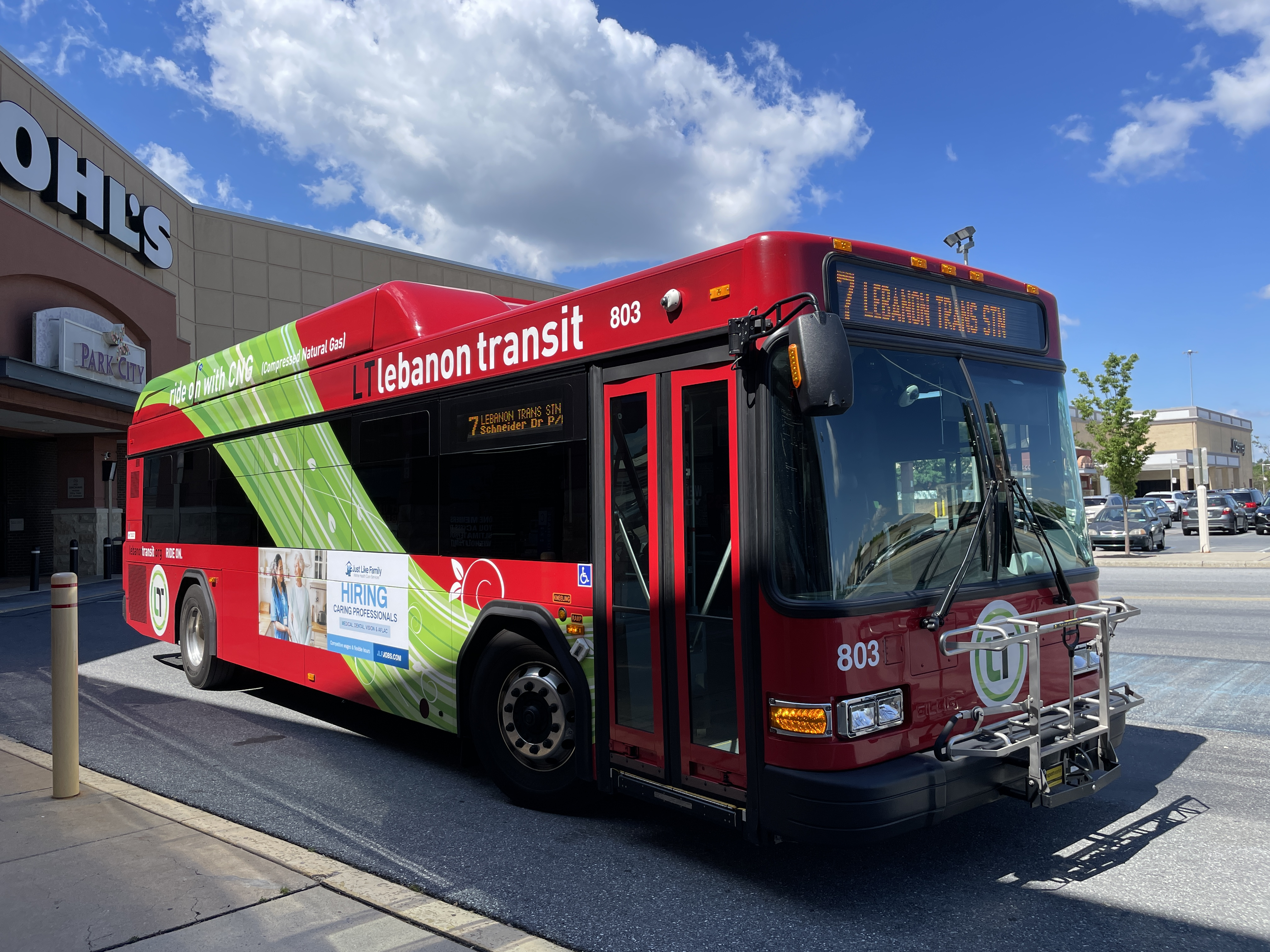
- Lebanon Transit bus 803 at the Park City Center shopping mall in Lancaster on the Route 7 line
- Headquarters: 200 Willow Street; Lebanon, Pennsylvania
- Service area: Lebanon County, Pennsylvania
- Service type: Bus
- Routes: 10 (conventional) 3 (express) 1 (special)
- Hubs: Lebanon Transfer Center
- Daily ridership: 800 (weekdays, Q2 2025)
- Annual ridership: 248,800 (2024)
- Fuel type: Diesel
- Website: lebanontransit.org

Lebanon Transit (LT) is an American public transportation service that is located in Lebanon County, Pennsylvania. It provides bus and paratransit service to Lebanon, Pennsylvania and select communities in the region, including service to Hershey. Lebanon Transit also operates commuter bus service to Harrisburg and a Saturday bus route to the Park City Center shopping mall in Lancaster.

In 2024, the system had a ridership of 248,800, or about 800 riders per weekday as of the second quarter of 2025.

== History ==
Previously known as County of Lebanon Transit (COLT), the system was rebranded Lebanon Transit on May 3, 2010.

== Routes ==
Lebanon Transit operates ten bus routes in their conventional bus service, and three express bus routes. On Saturdays, a special route is operated outside of the county to Park City Center shopping mall in neighboring Lancaster County.

All bus routes operate on a hub and spoke style network and depart from the Downtown Bus Terminal on Willow Avenue.

=== Urban routes ===
Former COLT Bus logo

- 1: to Lebanon Valley Mall, Weis Market, Lebanon Plaza, Foodland, Manor Care, Quentin Circle, Norman Dr., Cornwall Rd.
- 2: to 8th St., Maple St., Spruce Park, Walmart, Lebanon Village, Lehman St.
- 3: to Webster Manor, Town House Apts., Alley Blind Center, Brookside Apartments, N. 10th Street.
- 4: to East Lebanon Area, WellSpan Good Samaritan Hospital, Salvation Army Store, Dollar Tree/Home Depot
- 6: to South 8th St. (GSH Dialysis), VA Medical Center, South Hills Park, Locust St., Good Samaritan Hospital
- 8: to West Lebanon County, Cleona, Annville, Palmyra, and selected Hershey areas
- 16: to Lebanon, Cleona, Annville, Palmyra, Hershey, Hershey Park, Grantville & Hollywood Casino at Penn National Race Course
- 16C: Late Night service to WellSpan Good Samaritan Hospital, Home Depot, and Walmart
- 17: to Park & Ride Shuttle, Giant, Walmart
- 88: to Cleona, Annville, and DHL

=== Express routes ===
- Commute King A: to Harrisburg via Cleona, Annville, Palmyra, and Hershey
- Commute King B: to Harrisburg via Jonestown and Fort Indiantown Gap
- 10 Old Forge Road Express: to Jonestown and Old Forge Road

=== Special route ===
- 7: to Quentin, Manheim, and Park City Center in Lancaster (Saturdays only)

=== Berks Area Regional Transportation Authority agreement ===
On September 9, 2013, LT implemented a pilot service with the Berks Area Regional Transportation Authority, in which a new regional service would be offered linking Reading, Lebanon, Hershey and Harrisburg. The service would use both BARTA and LT buses over the length of the route, and times would be coordinated if a transfer would be necessary between the two agency's buses. The service is expected to be run for a reasonable trial time period, and expanded if found to be adequately patronized. The service has hopes of replacing service previously offered by Bieber Tourways, which had abandoned the service on July 1, 2013.

== Paratransit ==
Lebanon Transit operates a paratransit service called LT Paratransit weekdays through the urban and county areas of Lebanon County. The service is operated as a shared ride service, and requires a reservation after being previously approved through PWD (person with disabilities) or ADA (Americans with Disabilities Act) program guidelines.
