= Fort Pitt (train) =

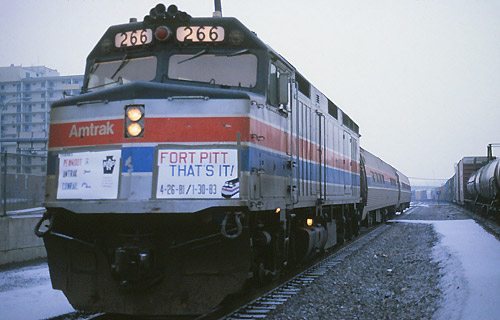
- The final Fort Pitt at Altoona station on January 30, 1983

Overview
- Service type: Inter-city rail
- Status: Discontinued
- Locale: Western Pennsylvania
- First service: April 26, 1981
- Last service: January 30, 1983
- Former operator: Amtrak

Route
- Termini: Pittsburgh; Altoona
- Stops: 4
- Distance travelled: 117 mi (188 km)
- Average journey time: 2 hours 37 minutes
- Service frequency: Daily
- Train number: 37-39

On-board services
- Class: Unreserved coach
- Catering facilities: On-board cafe

Technical
- Rolling stock: Amfleet coaches
- Track gauge: 1,435 mm (4 ft 8 1/2 in) standard gauge
- Track owner: Conrail

The Fort Pitt was a 117-mile (188 km) daily passenger train operated by Amtrak between Pittsburgh, Pennsylvania, and Altoona, Pennsylvania. The Fort Pitt was a so-called Section 403(b) train, meaning that its operation was subsidized by the state of Pennsylvania.

The Fort Pitt operated in tandem with the Pennsylvanian, then a Pittsburgh—Philadelphia service. The westbound Pennsylvanian, after arriving in Pittsburgh in the evening, would be turned around and east to Altoona. The following morning, that trainset returned to Pittsburgh as a westbound Fort Pitt, then ran eastbound to Philadelphia (Pennsylvania) as a Pennsylvanian. This allowed Amtrak and the Pennsylvania Department of Transportation (PennDOT) to operate two routes with the same two equipment sets. A typical consist was three to four Amfleet coaches pulled by an EMD F40PH locomotive. Amtrak added Pitcairn as a stop in mid-1981 to supplement the Pittsburgh—Greensburg Parkway Limited commuter train.

The Fort Pitt began operation April 26, 1981, and was withdrawn on January 30, 1983, when PennDOT declined to continue funding the train. On average, the Fort Pitt carried 30 passengers daily, set against a subsidy of $547,453.
