= Spirit of St. Louis (train) =

Passenger train operated by Penn Central and Amtrak

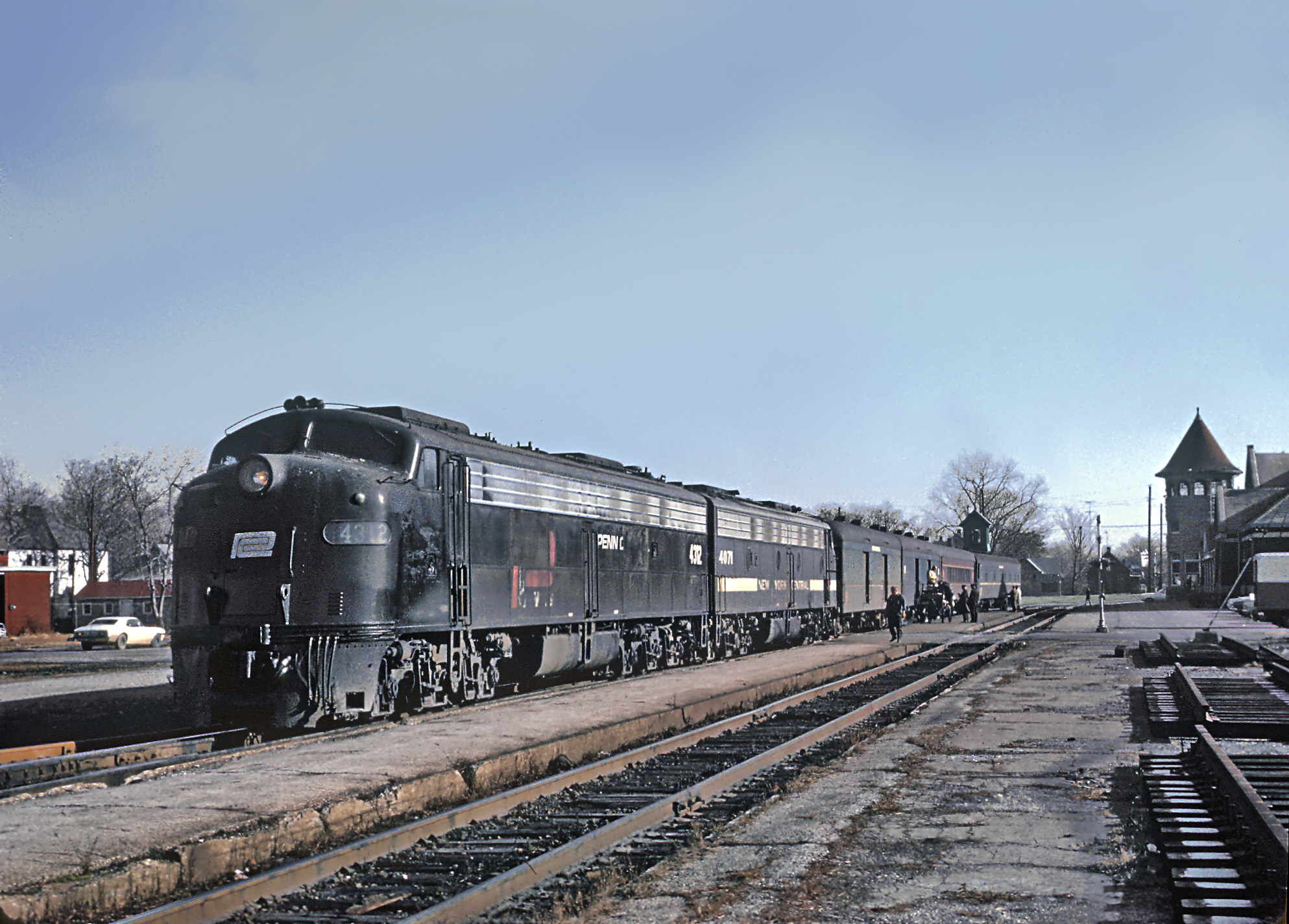
- The Spirit of St. Louis at Terre Haute, Indiana, in 1970

Overview
- Service type: Inter-city rail
- Status: Discontinued
- Locale: Eastern United States
- Predecessor: New Yorker (eastbound); St. Louisian (westbound)
- First service: June 15, 1927
- Last service: July 1971
- Successor: National Limited
- Former operator(s): Pennsylvania Railroad (1927–1968); Penn Central (1968–1971); Amtrak (1971)

Route
- Termini: New York City; St. Louis, Missouri
- Distance travelled: 1,050.6 miles (1,690.8 km)
- Service frequency: Daily
- Train number(s): 30 (St. Louis to New York); 31 (New York to St. Louis)
- Line(s) used: Main Line (Pennsylvania Railroad)

On-board services
- Seating arrangements: Reclining seat coaches
- Sleeping arrangements: Roomettes, double bedrooms (1964)
- Catering facilities: Dining car
- Observation facilities: Lounge car

Technical
- Timetable number(s): 30 (eastbound); 31 (westbound)

The Spirit of St. Louis was a named passenger train on the Pennsylvania Railroad and its successors Penn Central and Amtrak between New York and St. Louis, Missouri. The Pennsylvania introduced the Spirit of St. Louis on June 15, 1927, replacing the New Yorker (eastbound) and St. Louisian (westbound); that September, its running time was 24 hours and 50 minutes each way.

The name honored the airplane Spirit of St. Louis, flown the month before by Charles Lindbergh from New York to Paris. The train competed with the New York Central's Southwestern Limited and the Baltimore & Ohio's National Limited, both of which connected St. Louis to the New York area.

Amtrak took over the Spirit of St. Louis in 1971, renaming it National Limited after the B&O train that the new company decided to cancel.. Amtrak extended the train's service to Kansas City, Missouri, along the Missouri Pacific Railroad main line, and added a branch from Harrisburg, Pennsylvania, to Washington, D.C., via York, Pennsylvania, and Baltimore, Maryland.
