= National Limited (Amtrak train) =

Defunct passenger rail service in the Eastern United States

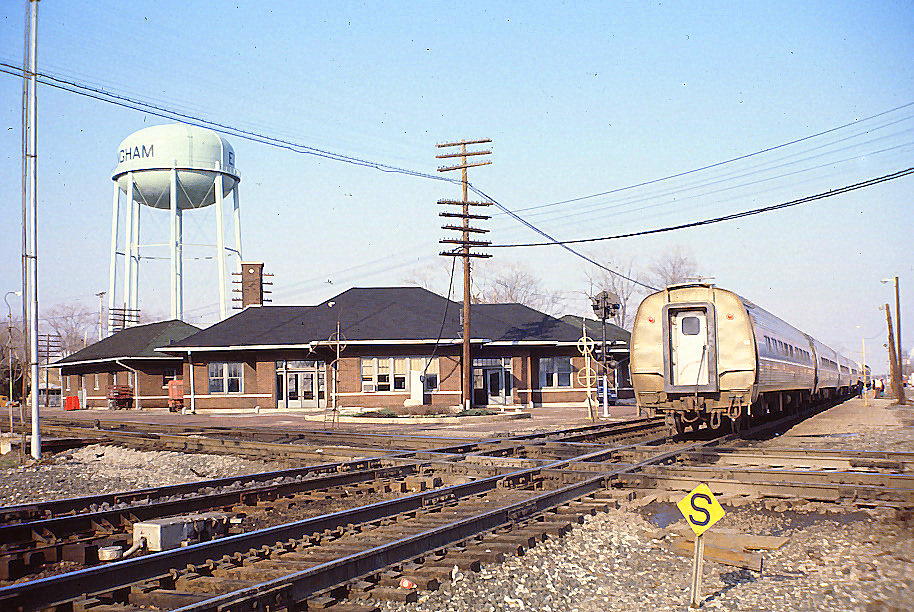
- The National Limited at Effingham, Illinois, in 1979

Overview
- Service type: Inter-city rail
- Status: Discontinued
- Locale: Eastern United States
- Predecessor: Spirit of St. Louis
- First service: July 1971
- Last service: October 1, 1979
- Former operator: Amtrak

Route
- Termini: New York City, New York; Washington, D.C. Kansas City, Missouri
- Distance travelled: 1,322 miles (2,128 km)
- Service frequency: Daily
- Train numbers: 30/31; 430/431 (Washington Section)

On-board services
- Classes: First class (sleepers); Reserved coach
- Sleeping arrangements: Bedrooms; Roomettes
- Catering facilities: Dining car
- Observation facilities: Dome car

Technical
- Rolling stock: Heritage fleet
- Track gauge: 4 ft 8 1/2 in (1,435 mm)

The National Limited was a passenger train that ran between Kansas City, Missouri, and both New York City and Washington, D.C., splitting in Pennsylvania. Amtrak operated the train from 1971 to 1979.

== History ==
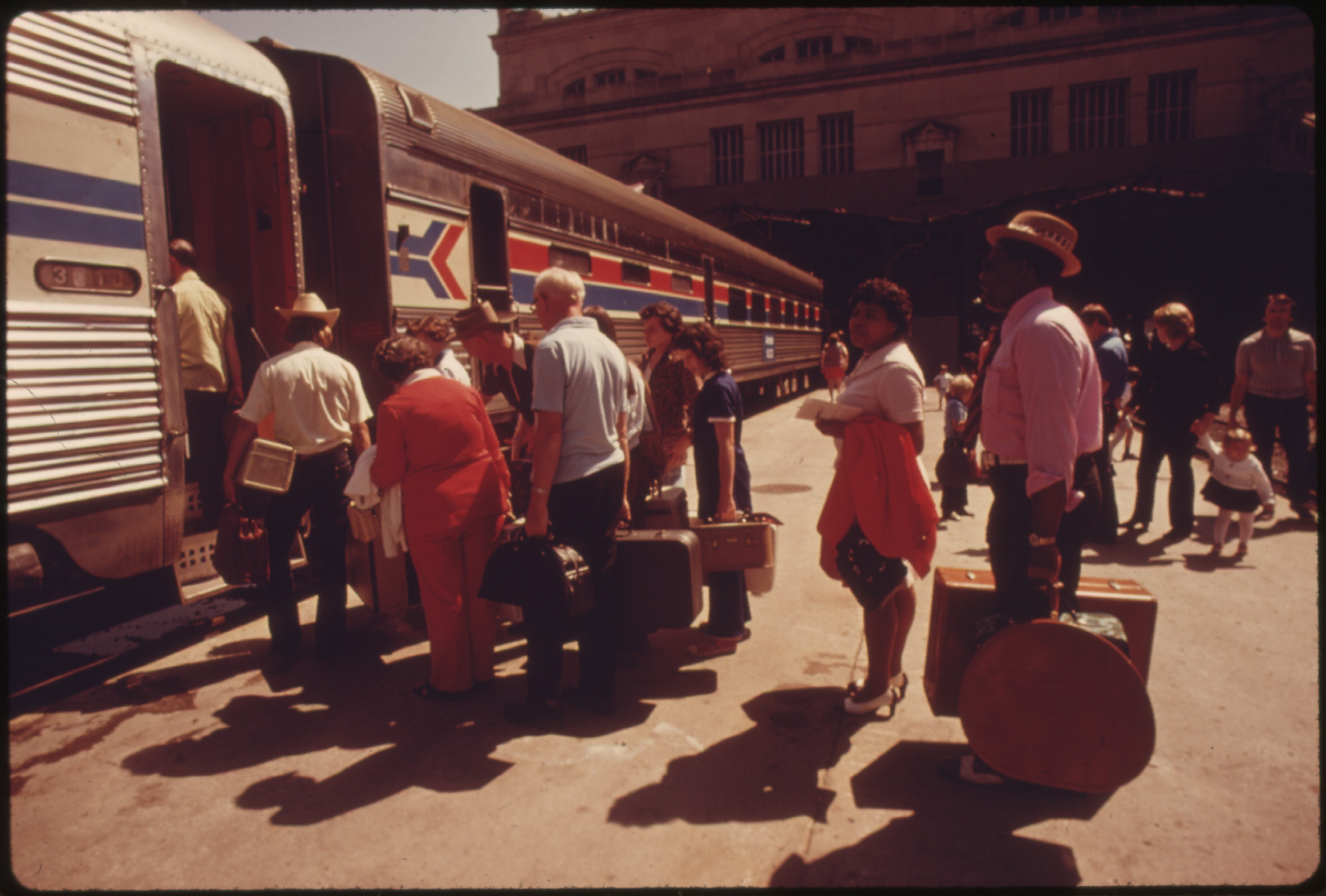
The National Limited at Kansas City in 1974

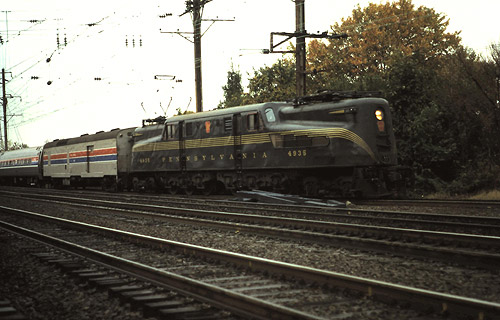
The National Limited switches from the Northeast Corridor to the Port Road Branch at Perryville, Maryland, in the 1970s.

In 1970, the Department of Transportation, in its designation of endpoints for the Amtrak system, ordered a train to run between New York, Washington, and St. Louis. The route had been served by the Spirit of St. Louis, originally run by the Pennsylvania Railroad and later inherited by Penn Central.

The route was later amended to run all the way to Kansas City, with a connection to the Super Chief running between Chicago and Los Angeles.

Amtrak initially retained the Spirit of St. Louis, extending it to Kansas City along the Missouri Pacific Railroad. In July 1971, the train was renamed the National Limited to better reflect the scope of the route. That name had been used by another New York-St. Louis train operated by the Baltimore and Ohio Railroad which had been the Spirit of St. Louis' principal rival. On paper, the route should have been a financial success. Not only did it serve a myriad of population centers (New York, Philadelphia, Pittsburgh, Columbus, Dayton, Indianapolis, St. Louis and Kansas City), but its predecessor had existed for almost 60 years (the St. Louisian had run along the route from 1913 until being replaced by the Spirit of St. Louis in 1927). However, it was fraught with problems almost from the start. It frequently ran late (and sometimes not at all), owing to the poor condition of ex-PRR trackage in Ohio, Indiana, and Illinois.

For most of its existence, the National Limited operated a Washington section. Until October 29, 1978, this section split at Harrisburg and reached Washington Union Station via the Port Road Branch. From that date until discontinuance, the National Limited split at North Philadelphia station, which had long been used as the sole Philadelphia stop for east-west PRR/Penn Central trains.

=== Demise ===
In 1979, the Carter administration, in its plan to cut Amtrak's budget, required all routes to meet a minimum cost/farebox ratio. Any train not making enough money would be dropped from the system. Rampant delays caused by deteriorating Penn Central trackage in the Midwest led to a substantial decline in ridership on the National Limited. Two other former Penn Central trains inherited by Amtrak, the Floridian (formerly the South Wind) and the James Whitcomb Riley, were plagued by similar problems.

Despite protests by local politicians, the National Limited made its last run on October 1, 1979. Although the National Limited saw increased ridership in early 1979 due to the oil crisis, it was not enough to spare the train. Amtrak officials said that eastbound trains frequently left Kansas City with fewer than 100 passengers even at the peak of the crisis.

The end of the National Limited spelled the end of intercity rail service in Columbus and Dayton. It also isolated Amtrak's primary maintenance facility, the Beech Grove Shops in Beech Grove, Indiana, near Indianapolis (inherited from Penn Central). The state of Missouri, not wanting to see service lost between St. Louis and Kansas City, stepped in on that part of the National's route, and introduced the Mules (the St. Louis Mule and the Kansas City Mule) to provide service there; this route has since been succeeded by the Missouri River Runner. Service to Indianapolis returned in 1980 with the Indianapolis–Chicago Hoosier State, which reconnected the Beech Grove Shops to the rest of the network.

== Potential restoration ==
In June 2021, Senator Jon Tester (D-Montana) amended the Surface Transportation Investment Act of 2021 to require the Department of Transportation (not Amtrak itself) to evaluate the restoration of discontinued long-distance routes, such as the National Limited. The bill passed the Senate Commerce Committee with bipartisan support, and was later rolled into President Biden's Infrastructure Investment and Jobs Act (IIJA), which was passed into law in November 2021. The report must be delivered to Congress within two years. The law also provides $2.4 billion in new funds to Amtrak's long-distance route network.

On October 28, 2022, the FRA announced the beginning of the Amtrak Daily Long-Distance Service Study as required by the IIJA. Its purpose is to evaluate the restoration and addition of discontinued and new long-distance passenger services, as well as the upgrading of tri-weekly long-distance services (the Sunset Limited and the Cardinal) to daily operation. The criteria for either restoring or creating new long-distance routes are that they connect large and small communities as part of a "regional rail network", provide economic and social well-being for rural areas, provide "enhanced connectivity" for the existing long-distance passenger trains, and reflect the support and engagement of the locals and region for restored long-distance passenger service. These criteria include the National Limited, among other trains. The study will take place through 2023, and will engage with stakeholders, the rail companies, and communities as it "evaluates how to better connect people with long-distance rail services".
