= Philadelphia Main Line =

Main Line of Philadelphia Main Line, Philadelphia Main Line
- Collection of suburban communities
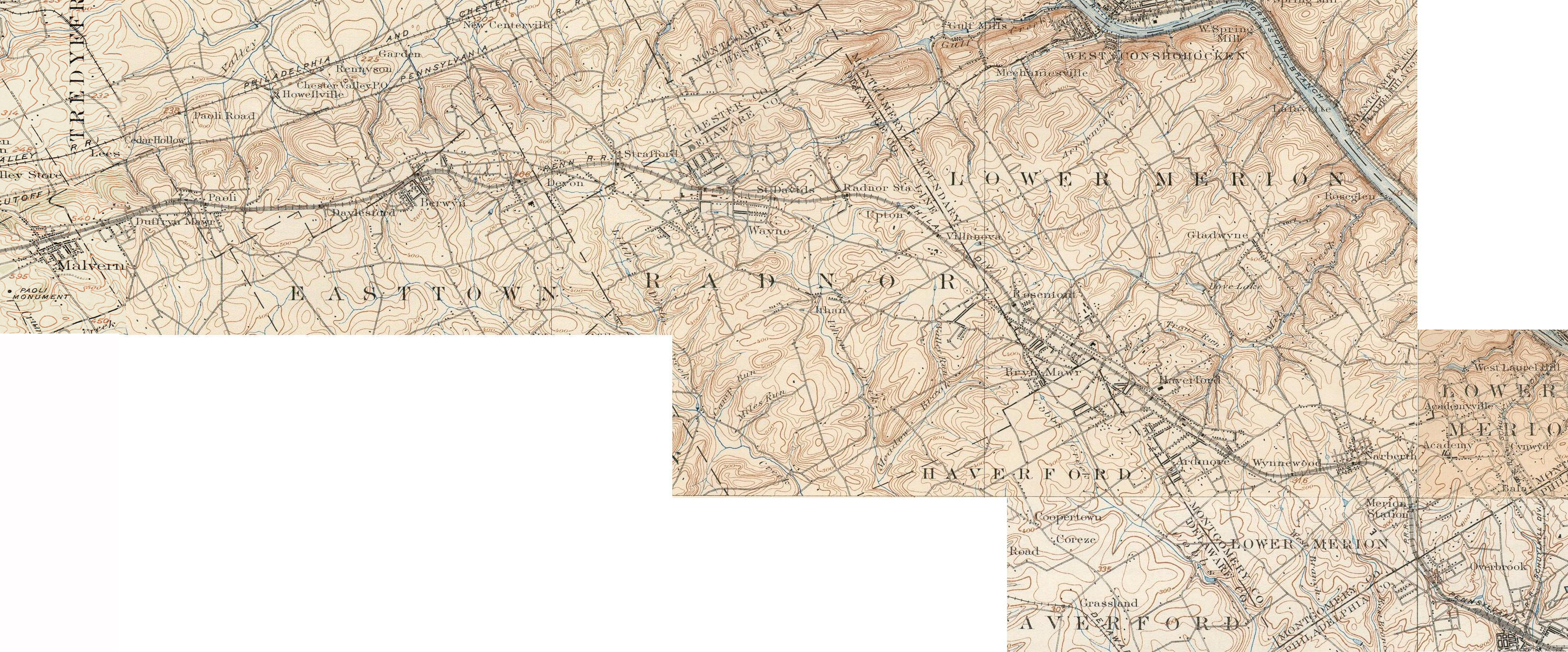
- Map of the historic Philadelphia Main Line, c. 1895

- Location of Pennsylvania in the United States
- Coordinates: 40.019°N 75.313°W
- Country: United States
- State: Pennsylvania
- County: Primarily Montgomery and Chester counties; certain northern parts of Delaware County
- Named for: The Pennsylvania Railroad's Main Line
- Demonym: Main Liner
- Time zone: UTC−5 (EST)
  - Summer (DST): UTC−4 (EDT)
- Area codes: 215, 267, 445, 610, and 484

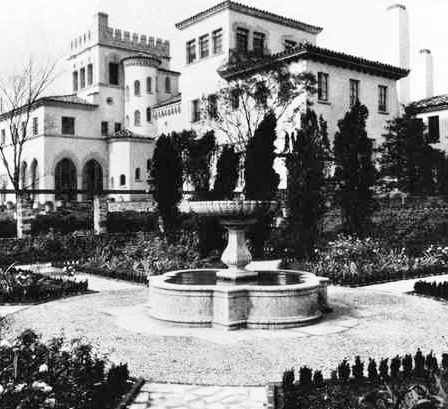
La Ronda Estate (1929–2009) in Bryn Mawr, by architect Addison Mizner)

The Philadelphia Main Line, known simply as the Main Line, is an informally delineated historical and social region of suburban Philadelphia, Pennsylvania. Lying along the former Pennsylvania Railroad's once prestigious Main Line, it runs northwest from Center City Philadelphia parallel to Philadelphia and Lancaster Turnpike, also known as U.S. Route 30.

The railroad first connected the Main Line towns in the 19th century. They became home to sprawling country estates belonging to Philadelphia's wealthiest families, and over the decades became a bastion of "old money". The Main Line includes some of the wealthiest communities in the country, including Villanova, Radnor, Haverford, and Merion. Today, the railroad is Amtrak's Keystone Corridor, along which SEPTA's Paoli/Thorndale Line operates.

== History ==
=== 17th and 18th centuries ===
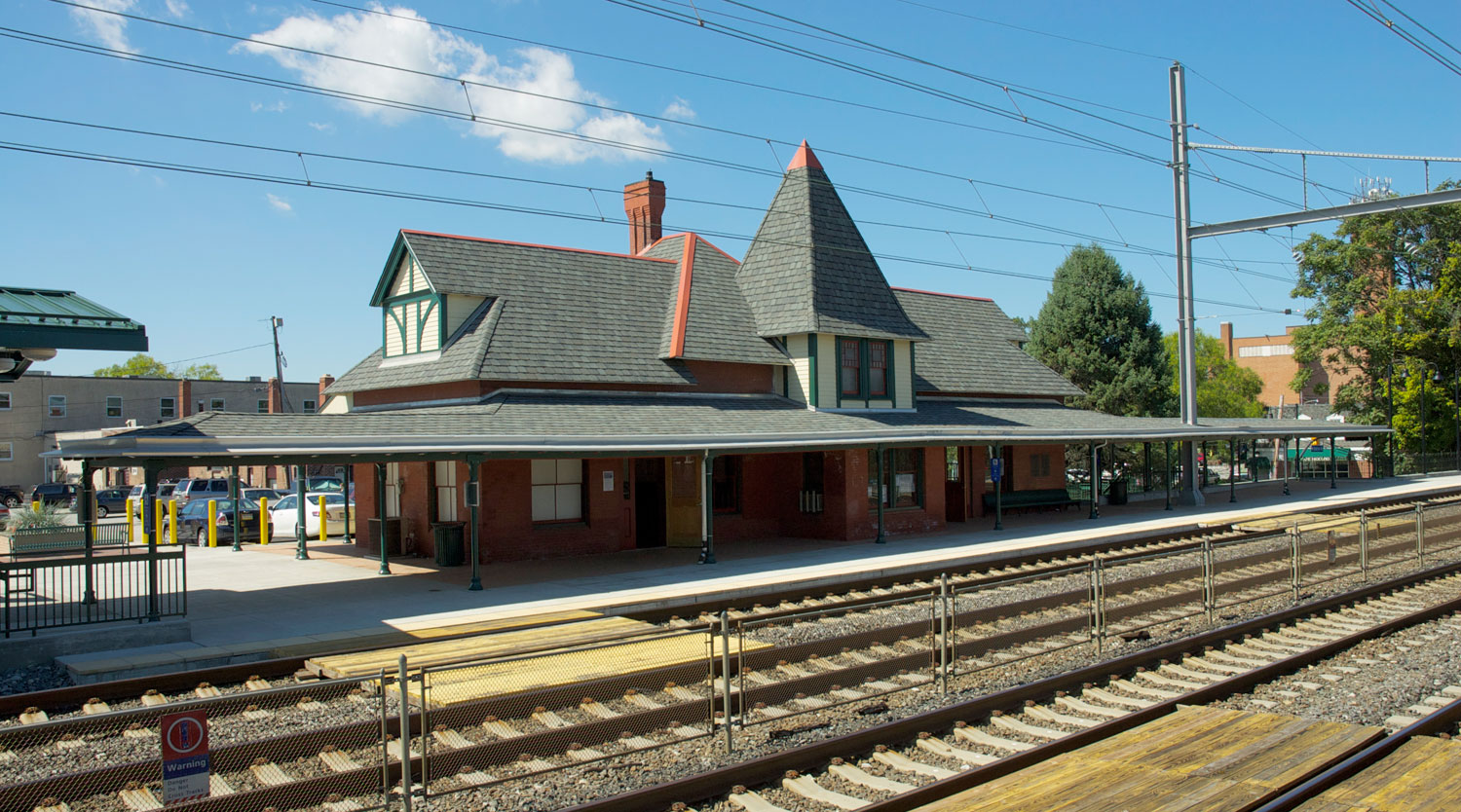
Wayne Station on SEPTA's Paoli/Thorndale Line after renovations in 2010

The Main Line region was long part of Lenapehoking, the homeland of the Lenape Native Americans. Europeans arrived in the 1600s, after William Penn sold a tract of land, called the Welsh Tract, to a group of Welsh Quakers in London in 1681. This accounts for the many Welsh place names in the area. However, what might be termed the "Celtification" of many Main Line place and street names occurred long after colonial times. So, for instance, as a marketing device to attract wealthy new residents, the area once awkwardly named Athensville became the more culturally glamorous Ardmore (Ardmore is a place name found in Ireland and Scotland) in 1873.

=== 19th century ===
The state of Pennsylvania built its main line during the early 19th century as part of the Main Line of Public Works that spanned Pennsylvania. Later in the century, the Pennsylvania Railroad, developed much of the land surrounding the tracks to defray the cost of major improvements, encouraged the development of this picturesque environment by building way stations along the portion of its track closest to Philadelphia. The benefits of what was touted as "healthy yet cultivated country living" attracted Philadelphia's social elite, many of whom had one house in the city and another larger "country home" on the Main Line.

=== 20th century ===
In the 20th century, many wealthy Philadelphia families moved to the Main Line suburbs. Part of the national trend of suburbanization, this drove rapid investment, prosperity, and growth that turned the area into greater Philadelphia's most affluent and fashionable region. Estates with sweeping lawns and towering maples, the débutante balls and the Merion Cricket Club, which drew crowds of 25,000 spectators to its matches in the early 1900s, were the setting for the 1940 Grant/Hepburn/Stewart motion picture The Philadelphia Story.

The railroad placed stops about two minutes apart, starting with Overbrook. The surrounding communities became known by the railroad station names which started at Broad Street Station in Center City Philadelphia and went on to 32nd Street Station, replaced by 30th Street Station in 1933, the 52nd Street Station (decommissioned), and then the Main Line stations: Overbrook, Merion, Narberth, Wynnewood, Ardmore, Haverford, Bryn Mawr, Rosemont, Villanova, Radnor, St. Davids, Wayne, Strafford, Devon, Berwyn, Daylesford, Paoli, and Malvern. At least five of these station buildings, along with the first Bryn Mawr Hotel, were designed by Wilson Brothers & Company.

A branch line of the Main Line (currently known as SEPTA's Cynwyd Line) extended to the communities now known as Bala and Cynwyd (via Wynnefield Station in Philadelphia), then proceeded to the West Laurel Hill Cemetery, where there was once a station, and crossed back into Philadelphia over the Schuylkill River via the famous Manayunk Bridge. Broad Street Station was replaced with Suburban Station in 1930, and 30th Street Station replaced 32nd Street three years later. Suburban service now extends west of the Main Line to the communities of Exton, Whitford, Downingtown, and Thorndale.

The railroad line then continued on to Chicago, with major stations at Lancaster, Harrisburg and Pittsburgh. The railroad, since taken over by Amtrak, is still in service, although its route is slightly different from the original. It also serves the Paoli/Thorndale Line of the SEPTA Regional Rail system.

=== Gilded Age ===
It was not only extremely wealthy people on the Main Line in the period 1880–1920. Wealthy households required large numbers of servants in order to maintain their lifestyle. Often these servants were Black migrants from the South and recent immigrants from Europe. For example, in the 1900 census, Tredyffrin Township was 13.5% Black; another 15% had been born in Europe. The two largest countries of origin were Italy and Ireland. The corresponding figures for Lower Merion Township were 6% Black and 15% born in Europe; almost 11% were from Ireland.

Another dimension of this story is illustrated by the community of Mount Pleasant, in Tredyffrin Township just north of Wayne. This is a community that became predominantly Black in the late 19th and early 20th centuries.

As of the 1920 census, most of the Black residents in the Mount Pleasant region, or their parents, had come from the South. Many of the men in this neighborhood, along Henry Avenue and Mount Pleasant Avenue, were employed by the railroad, as quarry workers, or as chauffeurs and gardeners by private families. The occupations often given for women were cooks and laundresses. This remains a predominantly Black community to the present day.

=== 21st century ===
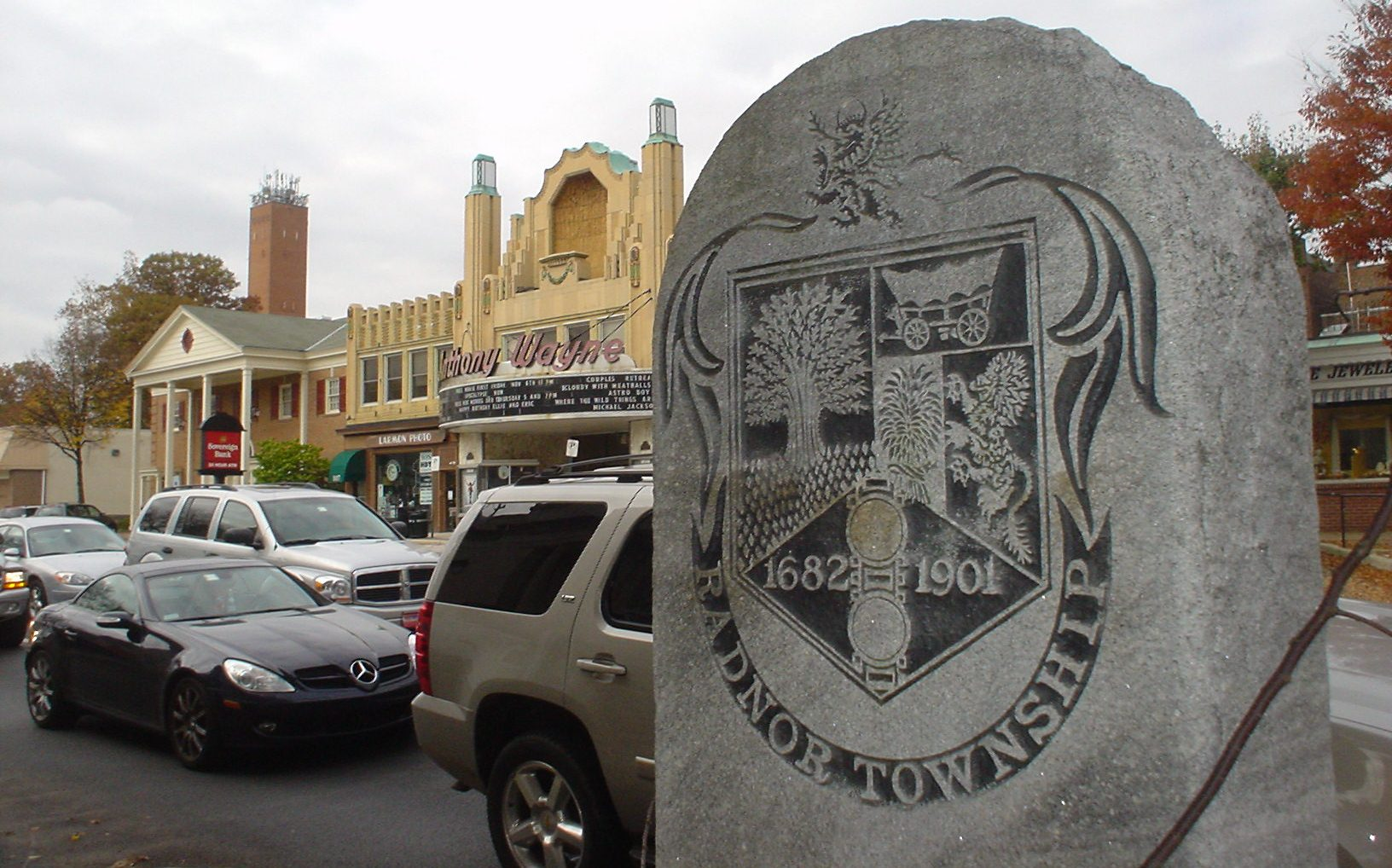
A mile post on U.S. Route 30 in front of Anthony Wayne Theater with AT&T tower in background

Today, the Main Line is another name for the western suburbs of Philadelphia along Lancaster Avenue (U.S. Route 30) and the former main line of the Pennsylvania Railroad and extending from the city limits to, traditionally, Bryn Mawr and ultimately Paoli, an area of about 200 square miles (520 km^{2}). The upper- and upper middle-class enclave has historically been one of the bastions of "old money" in the Northeast, along with places like Long Island's North Shore (AKA: "Gold Coast"); Westchester County, New York; Middlesex County, Massachusetts; and Fairfield County, Connecticut.

Neighborhoods along the Main Line include nineteenth and early twentieth-century railroad suburbs and post-war subdivisions, as well as a few surviving buildings from before the suburban development era. The area today is known primarily for several educational institutions as well as robust suburban life.

== Geography ==
=== Core towns ===
Core towns Additional core towns Infill communities

The original Main Line towns are widely considered to follow the acronym "Old Maids Never Wed And Have Babies." From Philadelphia, they are:

- Overbrook
- Merion
- Narberth
- Wynnewood
- Ardmore
- Haverford
- Bryn Mawr

These seven towns are characterized as one of the primary bastions of old money in Southeastern Pennsylvania. They are comparably more dense than other suburbs and have lively, walkable downtowns. All of these communities were established along Lancaster Avenue prior to the railroad's construction.

As early as 1887, Bala and Cynwyd were also included in atlases of the Pennsylvania Railroad in Lower Merion Township and Montgomery County. By 1908, one of the first atlases to refer specifically to the "Main Line" as a socio-cultural entity includes:

- Bala
- Cynwyd

The following towns are often grouped with the core Main Line:

- Wayne
- Paoli
- Malvern

=== Infill communities ===
Beyond these nine communities, many others have grown in the 20th century, either in between the core towns or nearby them, including:

- Gladwyne, immediately to the northeast of Bryn Mawr
- Villanova and Radnor, between Bryn Mawr and Wayne
- Strafford, Devon, and Berwyn, between Wayne and Paoli

These communities are primarily residential and consist of larger lot sizes than in the nine core towns. All of them, except Gladwyne, are on the railroad and have their own station stop.

== Demographics ==
There is no collective data for the Main Line, so all data is by ZIP Code. The median family income on the Main Line is $192,630. In comparison, the median family income for the state of Pennsylvania is $87,500. The following ZIP codes are those within the previously mentioned municipalities that make up the Main Line. Income data are from the 2024 American Communities Survey. Data on median home prices are from Zillow.

ZIP code	Name/Aliases	Population	Median family income	Median home price
19003	Ardmore	14,146	$169,026	$528,326
19004	Bala Cynwyd	9,942	$186,250	$672,890
19010	Bryn Mawr, Rosemont, Garrett Hill	21,629	$202,173	$908,007
19035	Gladwyne	3,956	$250,001	$1,558,538
19041	Haverford	6,535	$250,001	$1,136,815
19066	Merion	5,409	$250,001	$1,096,288
19072	Narberth, Penn Valley	10,782	$250,001	$839,327
19085	Villanova, Radnor	10,333	$250,001	$1,564,548
19087	Wayne, St. Davids, Strafford, Chesterbrook	33,717	$208,213	$833,856
19096	Wynnewood, Penn Wynne	15,107	$244,893	$806,191
19301	Paoli	7,617	$173,217	$640,803
19312	Berwyn	11,745	$239,773	$982,757
19333	Devon	7,953	$221,875	$858,336
19355	Malvern	28,188	$206,299	$787,463

== Transportation ==
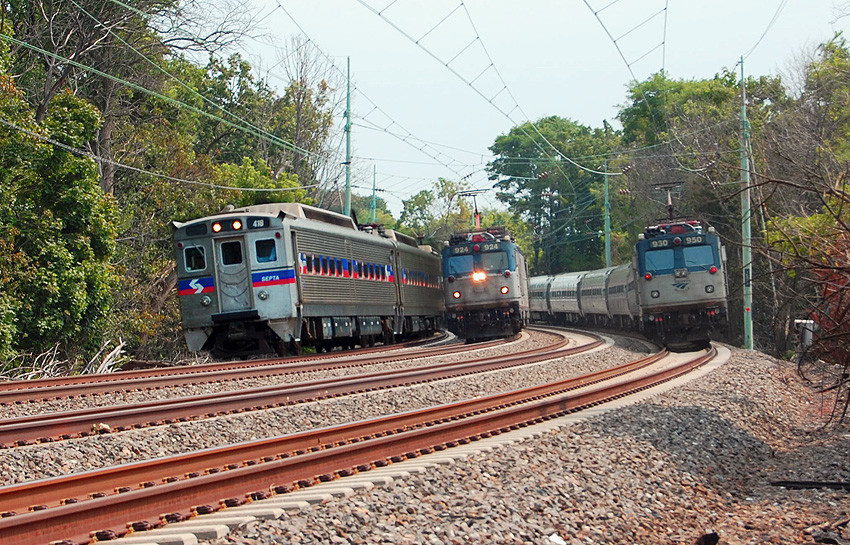
SEPTA and Amtrak share a four track rail line between Philadelphia and Thorndale.

The Main Line is served by numerous modes of transportation among which are three commuter rail lines operated by SEPTA. Connecting the region directly with Center City Philadelphia are the Paoli/Thorndale Line which shares the former Pennsylvania Railroad four track Keystone Corridor grade with Amtrak, and the Manayunk/Norristown Line which operates over the former Reading Railroad Norristown grade. The light rail Norristown High Speed Line runs over the Philadelphia and Western Railroad line between 69th Street Transportation Center in Upper Darby and Norristown Transportation Center in Norristown. Amtrak's intercity Keystone Service (New York City to Harrisburg) and Pennsylvanian (New York City to Pittsburgh) also serve the region with stops at the jointly operated Amtrak/SEPTA stations at Ardmore and Paoli.

The main thoroughfare through the Main Line is U.S. Route 30 which follows Lancaster Avenue (formerly the Philadelphia and Lancaster Turnpike) running east to west and serves as the backbone of the region by connecting a large majority of its towns and municipalities. Other highways serving the area are the Schuylkill Expressway (I-76) which connects it to Philadelphia, and the Blue Route (I-476) which runs north to south connecting the region with the Northeast Extension and the Pennsylvania Turnpike to the north, and to Philadelphia International Airport and I-95 to the south. Along the northern edge of the Main Line, US 202 runs from I-76 in a southwesterly direction, crossing US 30 in Frazer.

SEPTA also commissions suburban buses on Route 105 to run from the 69th Street Transportation Center in Upper Darby to Rosemont and Paoli. This bus runs almost entirely along Lancaster Avenue.

SEPTA also offers light rail service through the Norristown High Speed Line. The Norristown High Speed Line runs along the Main Line from Upper Darby to Ithan Avenue Station and Villanova Station before making a northward turn at the junction of Lancaster Avenue and the Blue Route toward Norristown.

== Recreation and attractions ==
A rider jumping in a sidesaddle class at the Devon Horse Show

- The Appleford Estate: A 300-year-old 24-acre (97,000 m^{2}) estate located in Villanova. Today it is maintained as an arboretum and a bird sanctuary. Its gardens were designed by renowned landscape architect Thomas Warren Sears and include woods, meadows, formal gardens, brick walkways, rhododendron tracts, a stream, pond, and waterfall. Admission is free of charge and the house is available as a rental for special events.
- The Barnes Arboretum in Merion.
- Bryn Mawr Film Institute: A non-profit community theater founded in 2002 in the old Bryn Mawr Theater building, built in 1926, which is in the process of significant restoration. The institute offers showings of classic movies of the 20th century, opera, film education courses, and film discussions.
- The Cynwyd Heritage Trail is a 1.8-mile (2.9 km) linear 'rail-to-trail' park which opened in 2011. The trail intersects with roads, bridges, neighborhoods, parks, railway stations, historic mills, and the West Laurel Hill and Westminster Cemeteries. The trail also connects to the pedestrian-only Manayunk Bridge on the Schuylkill River, which opened in 2015.
- Chanticleer Garden: An estate and botanical garden located in Wayne, which is listed on the National Register of Historic Places.
- The Devon Horse Show: The oldest and largest multi-breed horse show in the U.S.
- Harriton House: Located in Bryn Mawr, was built in 1704 by a Welsh Quaker named Rowland Ellis. He named the estate "Bryn Mawr", meaning "high hill" in Welsh, which is where the community gained its name. The house's best known occupant was Charles Thomson, the first and only secretary of the Continental Congress in Philadelphia.
- Waynesborough: Revolutionary war hero Anthony Wayne's historic estate, where he was born. It is registered as a National Historic Landmark and is a historic house museum.
- Jenkins Arboretum: A nonprofit botanical garden located in Devon.
- King of Prussia Mall located in King of Prussia is the third-largest mall in terms of retail space in America and is only a short distance away from the Main Line.
- The Lower Merion Academy was built in 1812, and is a 3 1/2-story, five-bay, stuccoed stone building with cupola in the Federal style. It was renovated in 1938, in the Colonial Revival style. Located in Bala Cynwyd, it is still used for educational purposes and now also houses The Lower Merion Historical Society. It was added to the National Register of Historic Places in 2002. The free education provided to local children in the Academy predated Pennsylvania's state laws mandating free public schooling (1834–1836).
- The Merion Friends Meeting House, in Merion Station, completed in 1715, is the third oldest Quaker Meeting House in the United States. It is still in active use by the Society of Friends. The property also includes stables and a cemetery, with an estimated 2,000 burials (many of which are unmarked in accordance with early Quaker custom). Construction began in 1695, and the meeting house exhibits distinctively Welsh architectural features, including a cross- or T-shape building plan, that distinguish it from later Quaker meeting houses. It was declared a National Historic Landmark in 1999.
- The Woodmont Estate

== Athletic and social clubs ==
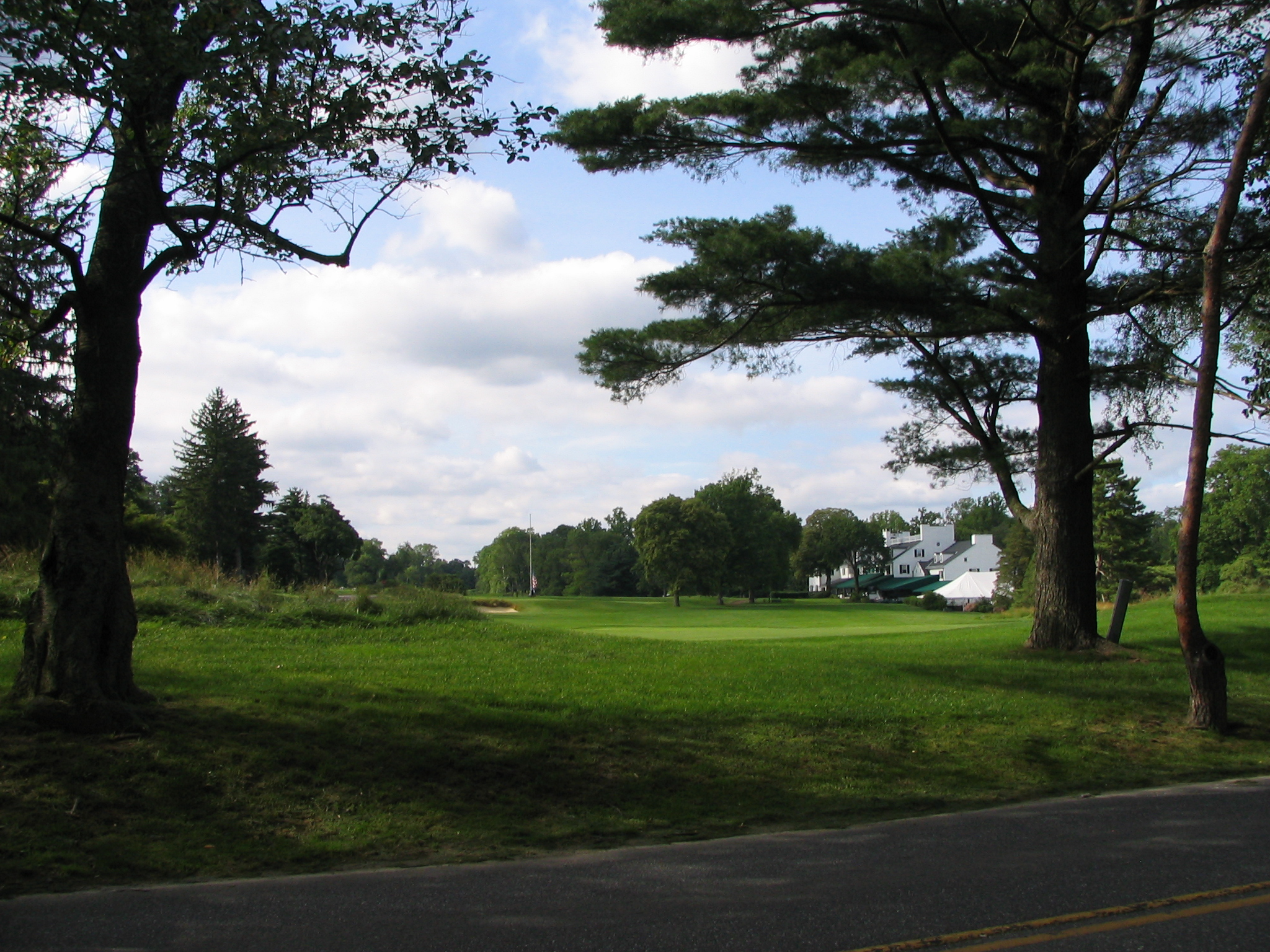
The first fairway at Merion Golf Club

Private clubs played an important role in the development of the Main Line, offering social gathering places and facilities for cricket, golf, tennis, squash, and horseback riding to wealthy or socially connected families. Among them are:

- Aronimink Golf Club
- Merion Cricket Club
- Merion Golf Club: Ranked America's 7th best golf course in 2008. Hosted the U.S. Open in 2013.
- Overbrook Golf Club
- Philadelphia Country Club: One of the first 100 golf courses established in the United States. Hosted the 1939 U.S. Open.
- Radnor Hunt: the oldest active foxhunting group in the United States

== Education ==
The school districts that serve the Main Line are Lower Merion School District in Montgomery County, Radnor Township School District and School District of Haverford Township in Delaware County, and the Tredyffrin/Easttown and Great Valley school districts in Chester County. The region has numerous private schools offering both religious and secular curriculums in addition to many public schools.

Public high schools

- Conestoga High School
- Great Valley High School
- Harriton High School
- Haverford High School
- Lower Merion High School
- Radnor High School

Private schools

- Academy of Notre Dame de Namur (Girls)
- Agnes Irwin School (Girls)
- The Baldwin School (Girls)
- Delaware Valley Friends School
- Devon Preparatory School (Boys)
- Episcopal Academy
- The Grayson School
- The Haverford School (Boys)
- French International School of Philadelphia
- Friends' Central School
- Holy Child School at Rosemont
- Jack M. Barrack Hebrew Academy
- Kohelet Yeshiva High School
- Malvern Preparatory School (Boys)
- Merion Mercy Academy (Girls)
- The Mesivta High School (Boys)
- The Phelps School (Boys)
- Sacred Heart Academy Bryn Mawr (Girls)
- The Shipley School
- Valley Forge Military Academy
- Villa Maria Academy (Girls)
- Woodlynde School

Parochial schools

- Archbishop John Carroll High School
- SS Colman-John Neumann School
- St. Aloysius Academy (Boys)
- St. Katharine of Siena School
- St. Margaret's School
- St. Monica's School
- St. Norbert's School
- St. Patrick's School

== Higher education ==
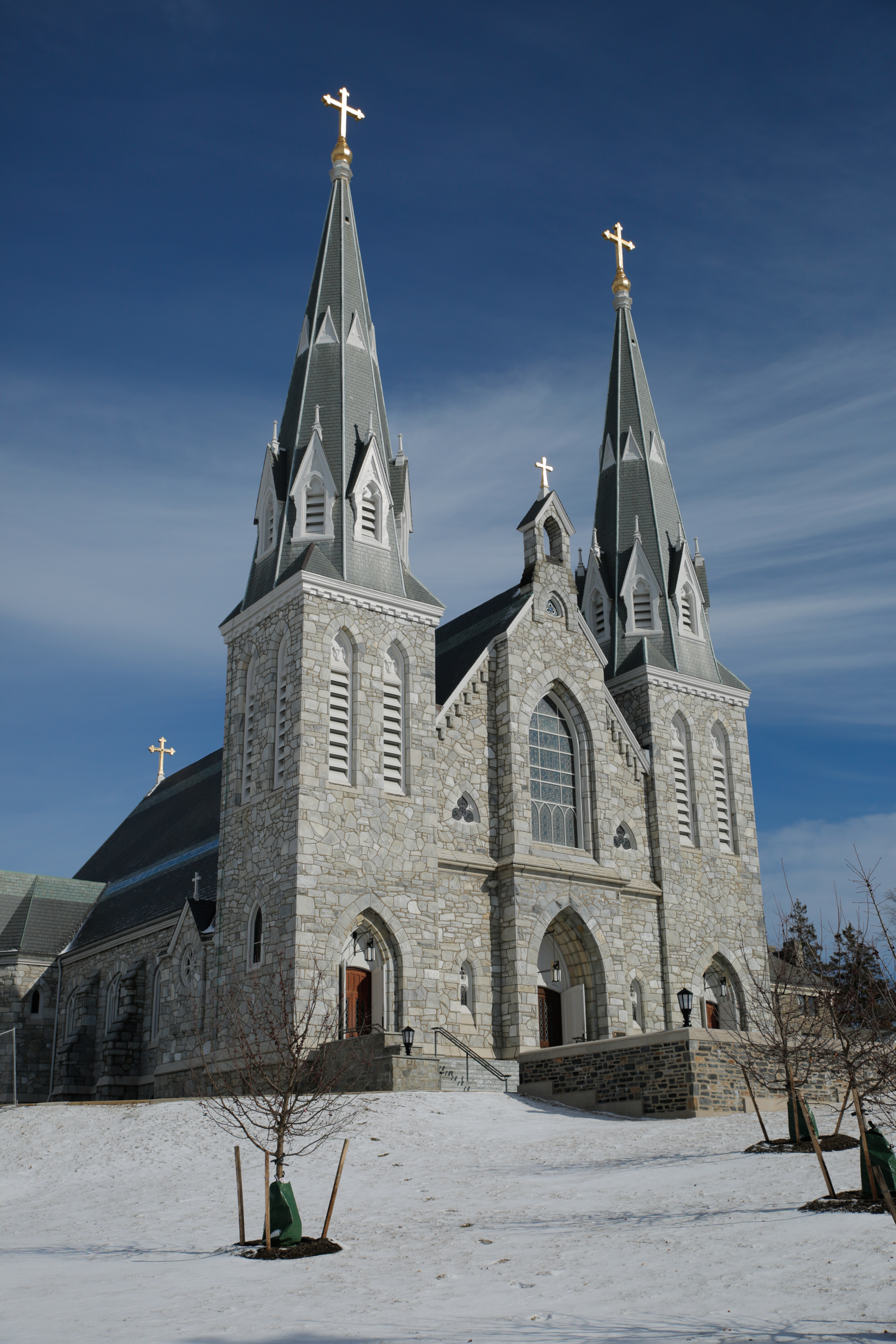
Saint Thomas of Villanova Church on the campus of Villanova University

- Bryn Mawr College
- Eastern University
- Harcum College
- Haverford College
- Immaculata University
- Penn State Great Valley School of Graduate Professional Studies
- Rosemont College
- Saint Joseph's University
- St. Charles Borromeo Seminary
- Valley Forge Military Academy and College
- Villanova University

== In popular culture ==
=== Film ===
A promotional poster for The Philadelphia Story

==== 1940–1989 ====
- The Philadelphia Story (1940)
- Kitty Foyle (1940)
- South Pacific (1958): Character "Lt. Joe Cable, USMC" is from Ardmore
- The Young Philadelphians (1959)
- The Happiest Millionaire (1967)
- Obsession (1976)
- Grease (1978): Loosely based on Radnor, PA
- Taps (1981): Filmed at VFMA, featuring scenes in Wayne (at Farmers Market and North Wayne Avenue)
- Trading Places (1983)
- Mannequin (1987)

==== 1990–present ====
- Downtown (1990): Set in Bryn Mawr and filmed in Philadelphia
- Philadelphia (1993): Tom Hanks's character celebrates Thanksgiving at his family home in Lower Merion
- To Wong Foo, Thanks for Everything! Julie Newmar (1995): The setting for Patrick Swayze's character's family home is Bala Cynwyd, with those scenes filmed in Montclair, New Jersey.
- Wide Awake (1998): M. Night Shyamalan movie, filmed at his alma mater, Waldron Mercy Academy
- The Sixth Sense (1999): The wake scene was set in Bryn Mawr.
- In Her Shoes (2005): Toni Collette's character attends a Main Line wedding and jokes about what she should wear.
- Pride (2007)
- Dare (2009)
- Happy Tears (2009)
- Tenure (2009)
- The Art of the Steal (2009): Documentary chronicling the acquisition and emigration of the Barnes art collection from Merion to Philadelphia.
- The Lovely Bones (film)
- Foxcatcher (2014)
- Split (2016)

=== Literature ===
- A Stranger Is Watching: The main character's murdered wife Nina grew up in a wealthy Philadelphia Main Line Family. In the book, it mentions that Nina went to Bryn Mawr College.
- Blackbird Sisters, mystery novels by Nancy Martin
- Bobos in Paradise, by David Brooks
- Official Preppy Handbook, by Lisa Birnbach
- The Pretty Little Liars series, by Sara Shepard, which uses the fictional Main Line suburb of Rosewood as its setting.
- Pterodactyls, by Nicky Silver. The play is set in a Main Line house.
- Song of Solomon, by Toni Morrison. The character First Corinthians is educated at Bryn Mawr College.
- The Catcher in the Rye, by J.D. Salinger. Valley Forge Military Academy (where Salinger attended for two years) is the basis for Pencey Prep. Additionally, the protagonist, Holden Caulfield, believes Jane Gallagher to have gone to Shipley, a Main Line private school.
- The It Girl, by Cecily von Ziegesar
- The Lovely Bones, by Alice Sebold
- The Man of My Dreams, by Curtis Sittenfeld
- The Badge of Honor Series, by W.E.B. Griffin. The main character, Matt Payne, is from Merion.
- Americanah, by Chimamanda Ngozi Adichie. The main character gets assaulted by a tennis coach in Ardmore and subsequently works as a nanny on the Main Line (possibly Merion)
- Luckiest Girl Alive, by Jessica Knoll, which uses the Main Line and the fictional Bradley School, based on The Shipley School, as its setting
- The Ginger Barnes Main Line Mysteries, by Donna Huston Murray, take place in the Philadelphia Main Line.
- That Summer by Jennifer Weiner

=== Television ===
- All My Children, Soap opera which aired from 1970 to 2011, set in a fictional suburb of Philadelphia, named Pine Valley and modeled after the town of Rosemont.
- Broad City: Co-creator and co-star Abbi Jacobson is from Wayne.
- Made
- My Super Sweet 16
- One Life to Live
- Thirtysomething
- Pretty Little Liars, as with the book, set in fictional Rosewood based on the city Rosemont, Pennsylvania and modeled after the town of Wayne, Pennsylvania.
- How to Get Away with Murder
- Mad Men: Betty Draper, Don Draper's wife in seasons one through three, is said to be from Lower Merion Township and to have attended Bryn Mawr.

== Notable residents ==
=== Arts ===
- Tory Burch, fashion designer and New York City socialite
- Albert C. Barnes, physician, chemist, businessman, art collector, writer, educator, and founder of the Barnes Foundation
- Walter Annenberg, newspaper and magazine publisher (Triangle Publications), ambassador, billionaire, philanthropist
- Gloria Braggiotti Etting, author, photographer, hostess, and wife of artist Emlen Etting

=== Business ===
- Ronald Perelman, billionaire, controlling owner of MacAndrews & Forbes and Revlon
- J. Howard Pew, son of Joseph N. Pew, founder of Sun Oil Company, and co-founder of The Pew Charitable Trusts
- John B. Thayer, cricketer, Pennsylvania Railroad VP (lost on the Titanic)
- Edward T. Welburn, Vice President of Global Design, General Motors
- John C. Bogle, founder and CEO of the Vanguard Group
- Alexander Cassatt, former president of the Pennsylvania Railroad
- Clement Acton Griscom, prominent 19th-century American shipping magnate, businessman, whose home, Dolobran in Haverford is noted for its architecture

=== Entertainment ===
- David Boreanaz, actor
- The family of Georg Ludwig von Trapp, the family depicted in The Sound of Music
- Chubby Checker, musician
- Gideon Glick, actor
- Patti LaBelle, musician
- Teddy Pendergrass, musician
- M. Night Shyamalan, film director
- Abbi Jacobson, co-star and co-creator of Comedy Central television series Broad City
- Kate DiCamillo, children's book author
- Anne Francine, actress and singer

=== Military and government ===
- Henry H. "Hap" Arnold, Commanding General of the U.S. Army Air Forces during World War II; General of the Army, General of the Air Force
- John Hickenlooper, U.S. Senator and former governor of Colorado
- Alexander Haig, U.S. Secretary of State, White House Chief of Staff, Supreme Allied Commander Europe
- Charles Thomson, secretary of the Continental Congress from 1774 to 1789
- Harris Wofford, former U.S. senator from Pennsylvania
- David Eisenhower and Julie Nixon Eisenhower
- Oscar Goodman, mayor of Las Vegas, Nevada
- Anthony Wayne, US Army officer and statesman

=== Science ===
- Bill Folger, Founder, American Society for the Adoption of the Metric System
- Pete Conrad, NASA astronaut; third man to walk on the Moon
- Andy Hertzfeld, computer scientist (Apple)
- Hilary Koprowski, polio vaccine pioneer

=== Sports ===
- Mark Herzlich, NFL football player
- Kyle Eckel, NFL football player
- Julius Erving, Hall of Fame NBA basketball player
- Kobe Bryant, Hall of Fame NBA basketball player
- Richie Ashburn, Hall of Fame baseball player with the Philadelphia Phillies and Phillies broadcaster
- Hobart "Hobey" Baker, amateur hockey and football player, member of the Hockey Hall of Fame
- Kyle Korver, NBA basketball player
- Allen Iverson, Hall of Fame NBA basketball player
- Jeffrey Lurie, owner of the Philadelphia Eagles football team
- Emlen Tunnell, member of the Pro Football Hall of Fame as a player, born in Bryn Mawr
- John Spagnola, former NFL football player
- Andy Reid, head coach of the NFL's Philadelphia Eagles and the Kansas City Chiefs
- Edward M. Snider, chairman of Comcast Spectacor, Philadelphia Flyers
- Jay Wright, head coach of the Villanova Wildcats men's basketball team
