= Merion station =

Railroad station in Merion, Pennsylvania

Merion
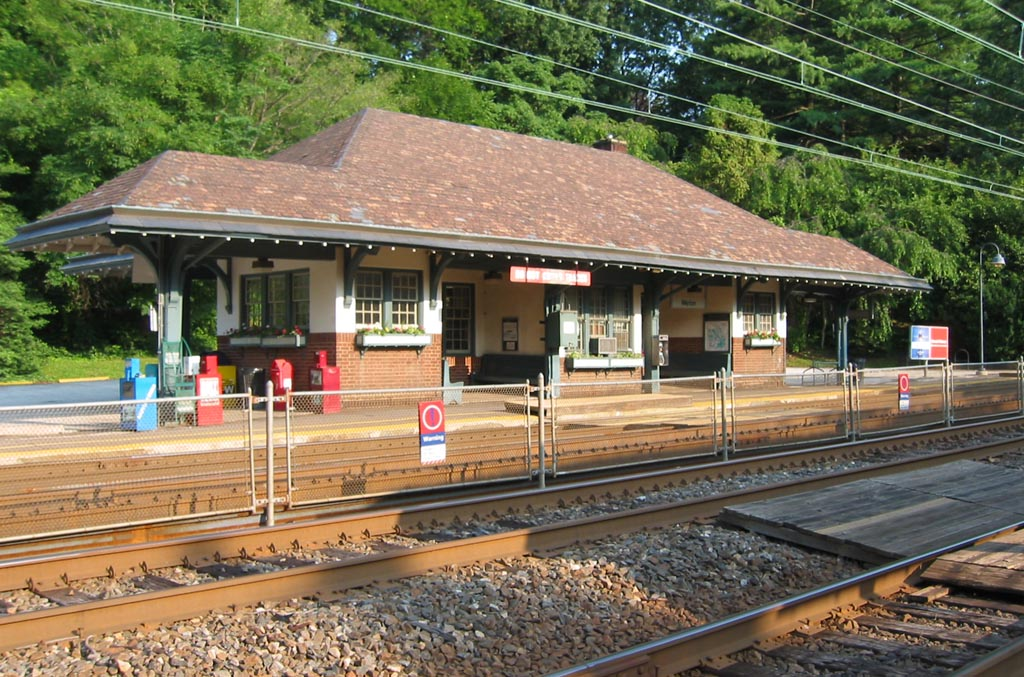
- Merion station house as seen from across the tracks in July 2005.

General information
- Location: 293 Idris Road; Merion, Pennsylvania; United States
- Coordinates: 39°59′51″N 75°15′05″W
- Owner: Amtrak
- Operator: SEPTA
- Line: Amtrak Philadelphia to Harrisburg Main Line (Keystone Corridor)
- Platforms: 2 side platforms
- Tracks: 4

Construction
- Parking: 87 spaces
- Cycle facilities: 24 rack spaces
- Accessible: No

Other information
- Fare zone: 2

History
- Rebuilt: 1917
- Electrified: 1915

Passengers
- 2017: 286 weekday boardings

Services
Preceding station	SEPTA	Following station
Narberth toward Thorndale	Paoli/Thorndale Line	Overbrook toward Temple University
Former services
Preceding station	Amtrak	Following station
Narberth toward Harrisburg	Silverliner Service Stop dropped in 1979	Overbrook toward Philadelphia–Suburban
Preceding station	Pennsylvania Railroad	Following station
Narberth toward Paoli	Paoli Line	Overbrook toward Suburban Station
Location

Merion station is a SEPTA Regional Rail station on the Paoli/Thorndale Line, located in Merion, Pennsylvania, just outside of Philadelphia. Merion has two low-level side platforms with pathways connecting the platforms to the inner tracks.

== History ==
The station building, constructed in 1917 by the Pennsylvania Railroad, is a designated historic station. It replaced an earlier structure built in the 1860s. It is one of the few historic stations to retain a complex of similarly-designed buildings: the passenger depot on the inbound side, and on the outbound side a still-active post office, outbound waiting room (now unused), and baggage building (also unused). SEPTA completed work to replace the station building's slate tile roof and renovate the outbound canopy in late 2007.

Amtrak stopped some westbound Silverliner Service trains at Merion until 1979.
