= Overbrook station =

Rail station in Overbrook, Philadelphia

Overbrook
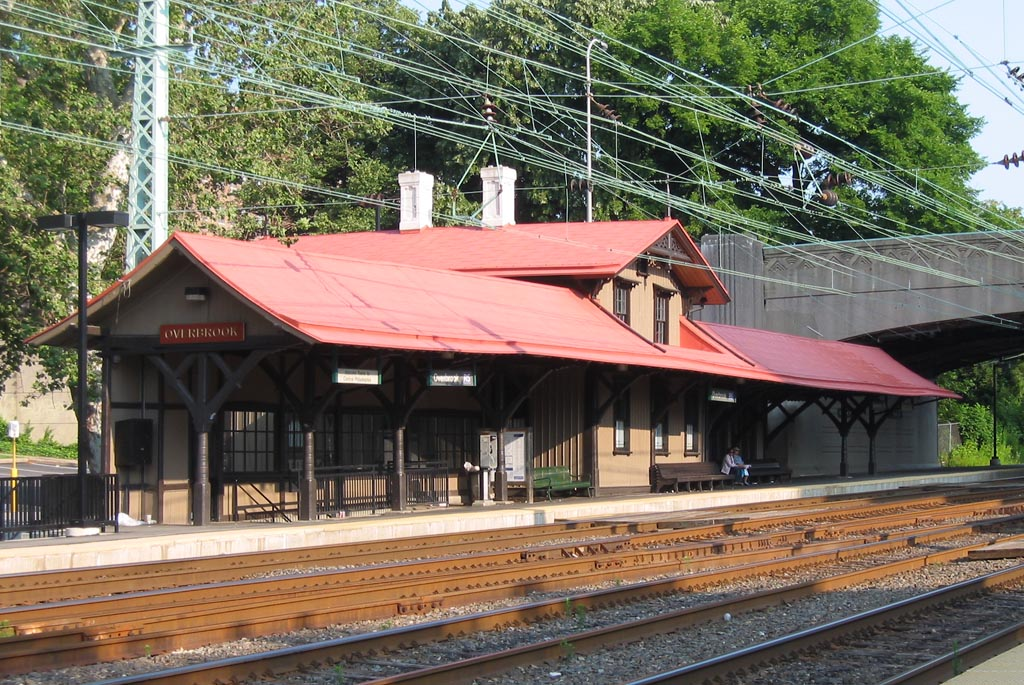
- Overbrook station in July 2005

General information
- Location: 2193 North 63rd Street; Philadelphia, Pennsylvania; United States
- Coordinates: 39°59′23.5″N 75°14′59.5″W
- Owner: Amtrak
- Operator: SEPTA
- Line: Amtrak Philadelphia to Harrisburg Main Line (Keystone Corridor)
- Platforms: 2 side platforms
- Tracks: 4
- Connections: SEPTA Metro: at 63rd–Malvern/Overbrook; SEPTA City Bus: 63, 65

Construction
- Parking: 162 spaces (112 daily, 50 permit)
- Accessible: yes

Other information
- Fare zone: 2

History
- Opened: 1860
- Rebuilt: 1999–2003
- Electrified: September 11, 1915

Passengers
- 2017: 774 boardings 717 alightings (weekday average)
- Rank: 26 of 146

Services
Preceding station	SEPTA	Following station
Merion toward Thorndale	Paoli/Thorndale Line	30th Street Station toward Temple University
Preceding station	SEPTA Metro	Following station
Terminus	major stops	36th Street Portal toward 13th Street
Former services
Preceding station	Amtrak	Following station
Narberth toward Harrisburg	Keystone Service Before 1988	Philadelphia–30th Street toward Philadelphia–Suburban
Preceding station	Pennsylvania Railroad	Following station
Merion toward Paoli	Paoli Line	52nd Street toward Suburban Station
Location

Overbrook station is a SEPTA Regional Rail station on the Paoli/Thorndale Line, located near 63rd Street and City Line Avenue (US 1) in the Overbrook neighborhood of Philadelphia, Pennsylvania. It serves many of the residents of Overbrook Farms and the suburban neighborhoods across City Avenue in neighboring Montgomery County, as well as Saint Joseph's University and Talmudical Yeshiva of Philadelphia. Overbrook has two low-level side platforms with pathways connecting the platforms to the inner tracks.

== History ==
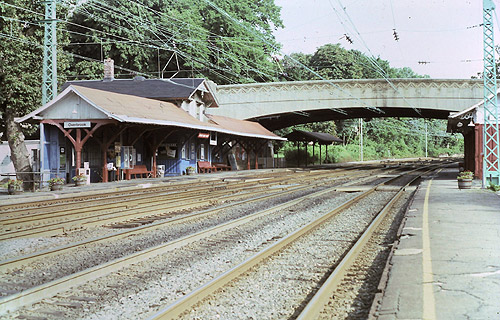
Overbrook station in 1984

The current station building was constructed around 1860 on the inbound (eastbound) side. The station, platforms, and canopies were restored from 1999 to 2003 in a $9.1 million project. A smaller shelter serves westbound passengers.

Amtrak served Overbrook with some westbound Keystone Service trips until 1987.

In 2009, the station was the site of a fire involving a Budd Silverliner II electric multiple unit catching fire due to a faulty heater.
