= Haverford station (SEPTA Regional Rail) =

SEPTA Regional Rail station in Haverford, Pennsylvania

Haverford
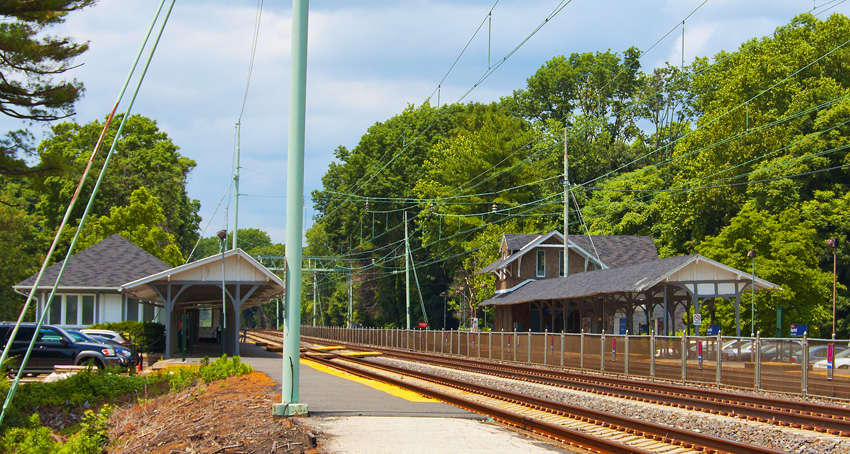

General information
- Location: 43 Haverford Station Road; Haverford, Pennsylvania; United States
- Coordinates: 40.0140°N 75.3003°W
- Owner: Amtrak
- Operator: SEPTA
- Line: Amtrak Philadelphia to Harrisburg Main Line (Keystone Corridor)
- Platforms: 2 side platforms
- Tracks: 4
- Connections: SEPTA Suburban Bus: 105

Construction
- Parking: 169 spaces (80 daily, 89 permit)
- Cycle facilities: 3 racks (6 bicycles)
- Accessible: No

Other information
- Fare zone: 2

History
- Opened: 1880
- Electrified: September 11, 1915

Passengers
- 2017: 404 boardings 328 alightings (weekday average)
- Rank: 66 of 146

Services
Preceding station	SEPTA	Following station
Bryn Mawr toward Thorndale	Paoli/Thorndale Line	Ardmore toward Temple University
Former services
Preceding station	Pennsylvania Railroad	Following station
Bryn Mawr toward Chicago	Main Line	Ardmore toward New York or Exchange Place
Bryn Mawr toward Paoli	Paoli Line	Ardmore toward Suburban Station
Location

Haverford station is a SEPTA Regional Rail station in Haverford, Pennsylvania. It is served by most Paoli/Thorndale Line trains with the exception of a few express runs, and is located on Haverford Station Road. The station was originally built by the Pennsylvania Railroad.

There are 169 parking spaces at the station. This station is 9.1 track miles from Suburban Station. In 2017, the average total weekday boardings at this station were 404, and the average total weekday alightings was 328.

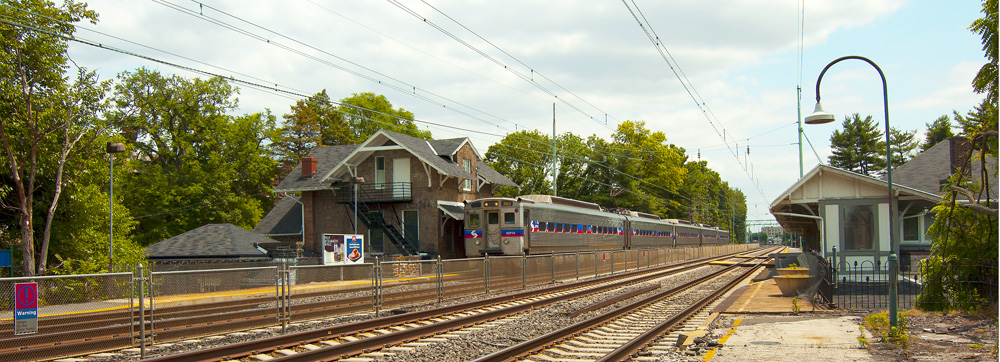
A westbound Paoli Local train at Haverford station.

== Station history ==
Originally called Haverford College station, the first station building was located south of the current location on the original path of the Philadelphia and Columbia Railroad. Until 1870, the tracks ran down what is now Railroad Avenue (between The Haverford School and Haverford College). In 1870, the Bryn Mawr cutoff rerouted the tracks to their current alignment in an attempt to eliminate curves and grades. The station house on the north side of the grade was built in 1870 (although some sources claim the origins to be roughly around 1880) by the Wilson Brothers architectural firm for the Pennsylvania Railroad. The station was built with an outcrop bay window on the first story which was removed when the mainline was expanded from two tracks to four.

The station is unique as there are 4 generations of structures at the station including the 1870 station house, c.1890 canopies, the 1898 north addition to the 1870 building, and a 1916 brick station/post office on the south side of the tracks. Haverford is also one of the few stations where the original station building was located on the outbound side of the tracks which explains the need for the inbound ticket office (on the south side) for commuters going into center city when the line was electrified. A freight house was located immediately west of the 1870 station building, but was removed in the late 1880s when the PRR moved Haverford Station Road under the grade in an improvement project to eliminate grade crossings on the mainline.

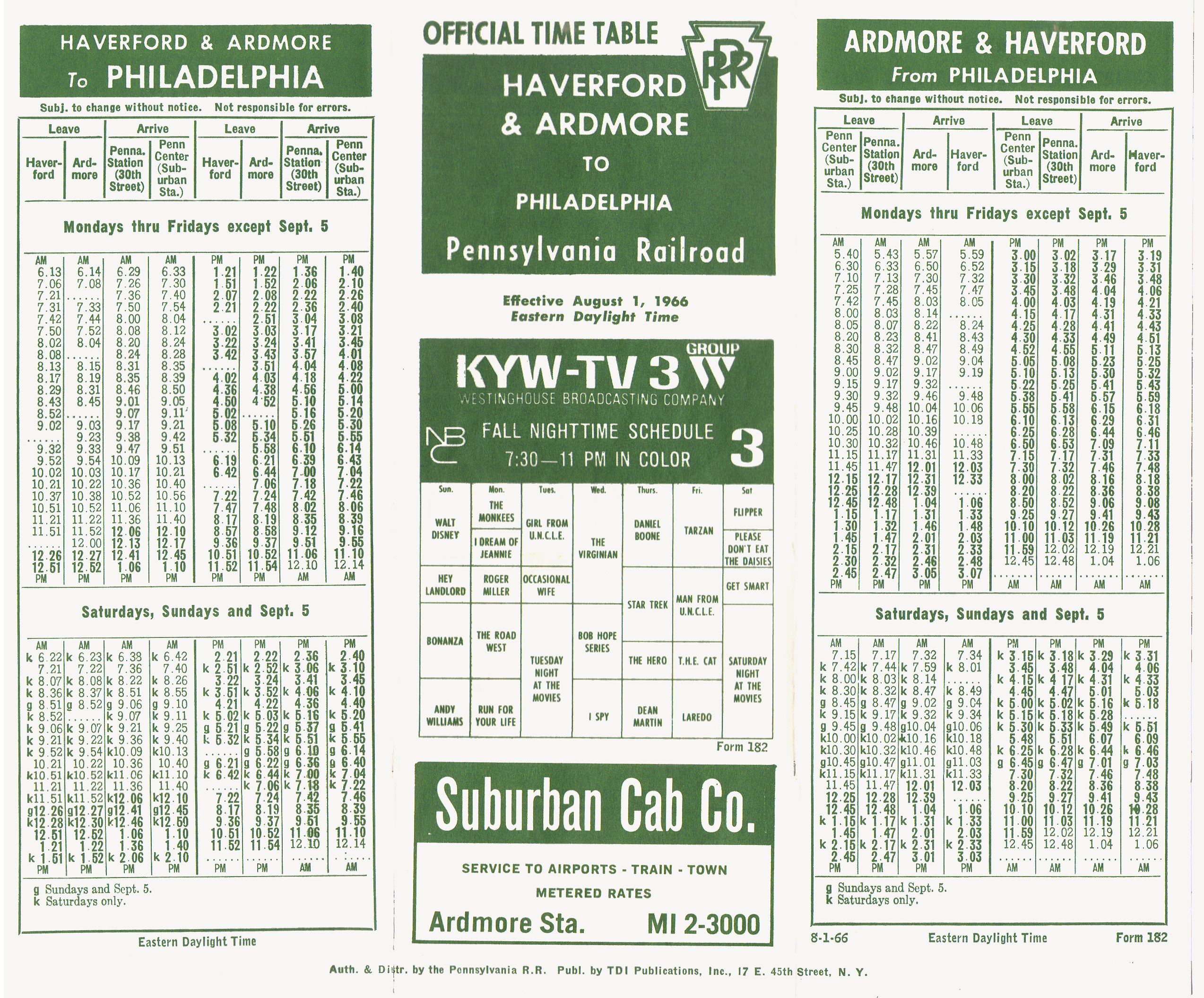
PRR commuter rail time table between Haverford and Philadelphia, 1966

The Pennsylvania Railroad operated commuter rail services at Haverford until merging with the New York Central in 1968 becoming the Penn Central which then filed for bankruptcy in 1970. Conrail was then responsible for operating all the former PRR commuter rail services including over the Main Line to Paoli/Thorndale Line until 1983 when SEPTA took over all regional rail operations in South Eastern Pennsylvania. Haverford is in the same situation as the other former stations on the Keystone Corridor and Northeast Corridor where Amtrak owns the properties and SEPTA leases them from Amtrak.

During the 20th century, the 1870s station building became obsolete; it suffered a fire in the 1970s which gutted the structure. The 1895 extension is currently rented to a private tenant which the main building remains empty.

== Station layout ==
Haverford has two low-level side platforms with pathways connecting the platforms to the inner tracks.
