= Wynnewood station =

Rail station in Wynnewood, Pennsylvania

Wynnewood
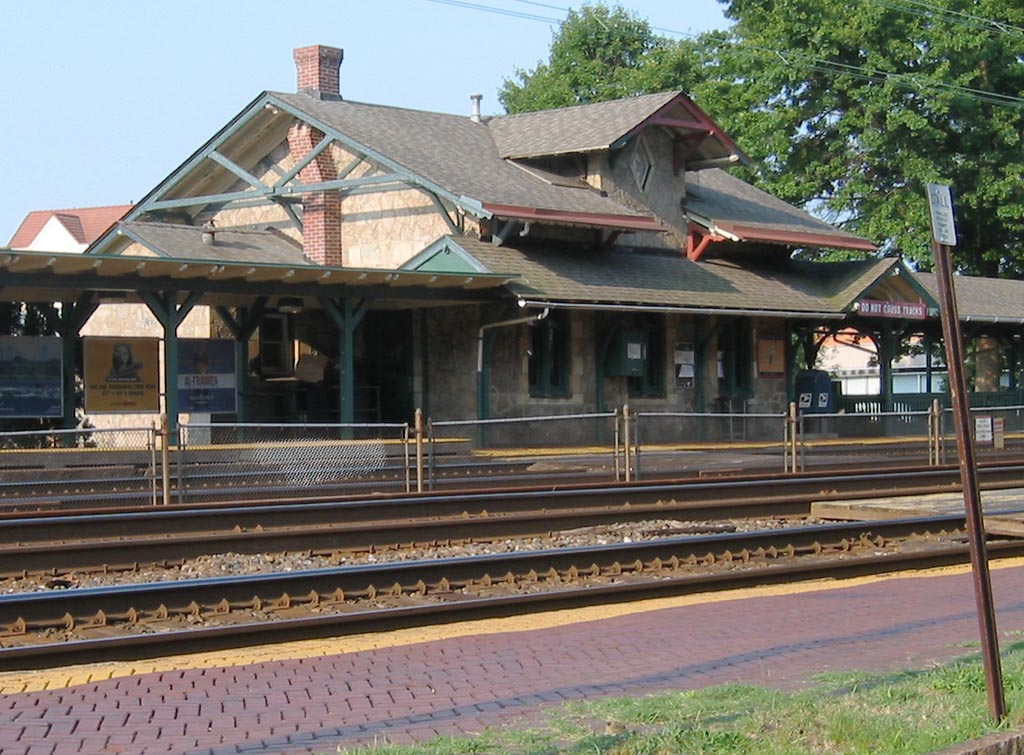
- Station in 2005

General information
- Location: 67 East Wynnewood Road; Wynnewood, Pennsylvania; United States
- Coordinates: 40.0027°N 75.2731°W
- Owner: Amtrak
- Operator: SEPTA
- Line: Amtrak Philadelphia to Harrisburg Main Line (Keystone Corridor)
- Platforms: 2 side platforms
- Tracks: 4
- Connections: SEPTA Suburban Bus: 105

Construction
- Parking: 239 spaces (117 daily, 122 permit)
- Cycle facilities: 4 racks (8 spaces)
- Accessible: No

Other information
- Fare zone: 2

History
- Opened: 1870
- Electrified: September 11, 1915

Passengers
- 2017: 765 boardings 561 alightings (weekday average)
- Rank: 28 of 146

Services
Preceding station	SEPTA	Following station
Ardmore toward Thorndale	Paoli/Thorndale Line	Narberth toward Temple University
Former services
Preceding station	Pennsylvania Railroad	Following station
Ardmore toward Paoli	Paoli Line	Narberth toward Suburban Station
Location

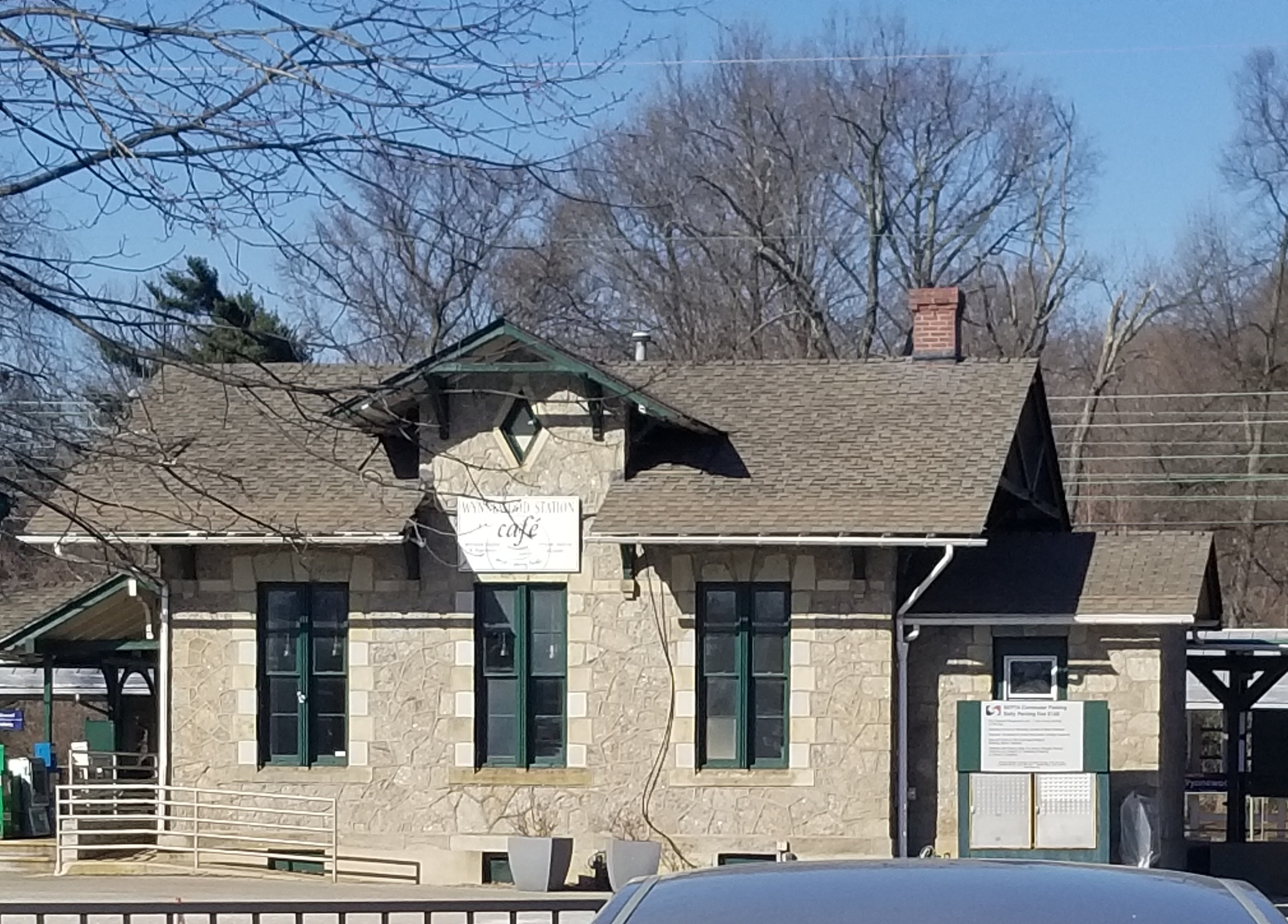
Street-facing side of the station building, photographed in 2018

Wynnewood station is a SEPTA Regional Rail station in Wynnewood, Pennsylvania. It is located at Wynnewood and Penn Roads in Philadelphia's western suburbs, and is served by most Paoli/Thorndale Line trains with the exception of several express runs.

The station was built in 1870 by the Wilson Brothers architectural firm for the Pennsylvania Railroad, and is one of the historic station buildings on the line built before 1930.

The station offers a small retail space, which is currently unused. The space was formerly occupied by Main Line Baking Company (2010–2016), Pup's Cafe (2009), Quaker Coffee (2005–2008), and Irish Bake Shoppe (1999–2005). The ticket office at this station is open weekdays 6:00 a.m. to 12:00 p.m. (excluding holidays). There are 239 daily and permit parking spaces at the station. This station is 7.4 track miles from Suburban Station. In 2017, the average total weekday boardings at this station was 765, and the average total weekday alightings was 561.

== Restoration and beautification ==
The Wynnewood Civic Association is a non-profit group of volunteers that maintains the landscaping and actively works to preserve and beautify the historic landmark.

== In popular culture ==
The train station scene from the 1962 film David and Lisa was filmed at this station.

== Station layout ==
Wynnewood has two low-level side platforms with pathways connecting the platforms to the inner tracks.
