= Narberth station (SEPTA) =

SEPTA Regional Rail station

Narberth
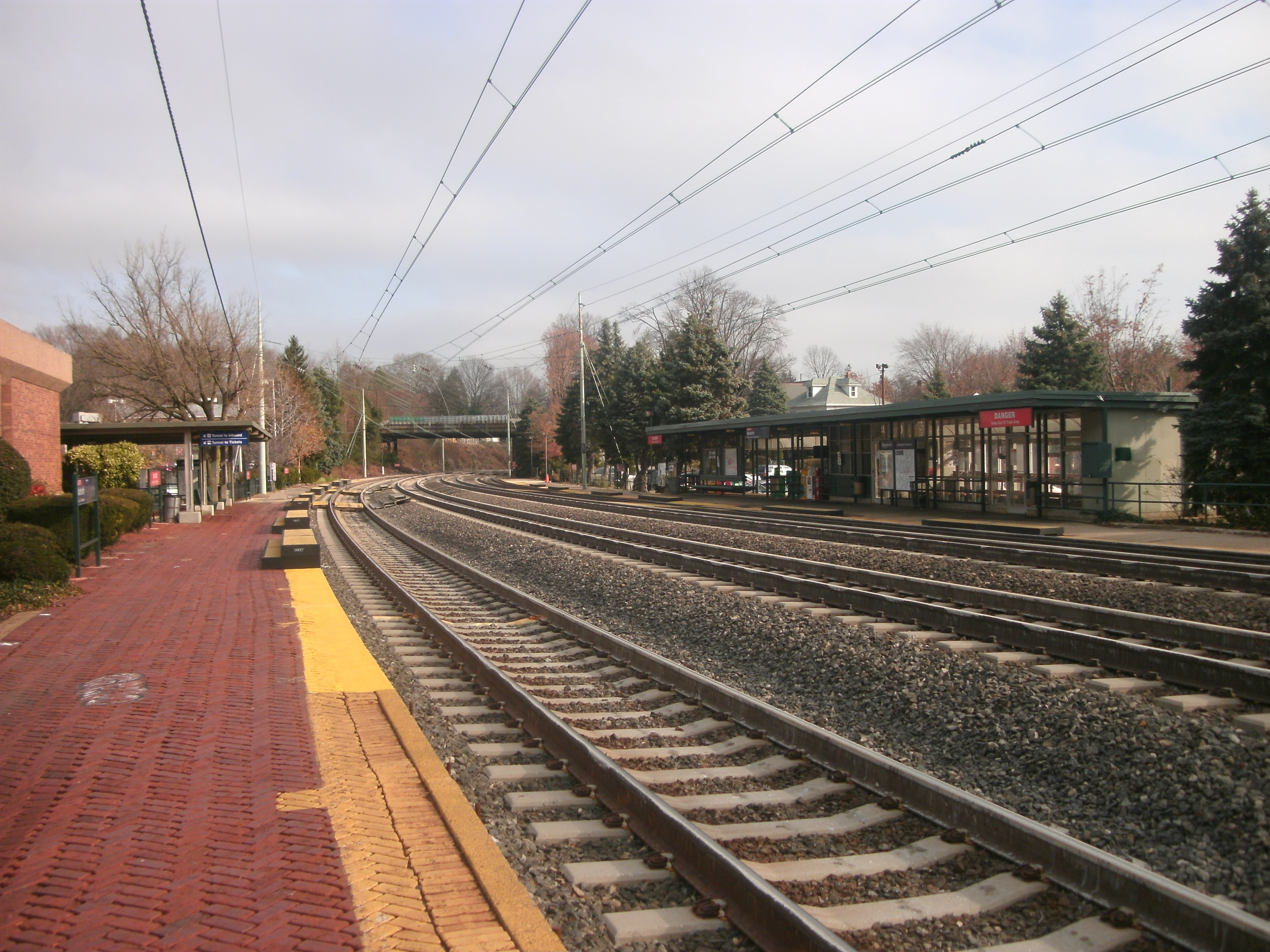
- The Narberth station as seen from the western end of the Thorndale-bound platform in December 2012.

General information
- Location: 211 Elmwood Avenue; Narberth, Pennsylvania; United States
- Coordinates: 40.0047°N 75.2615°W
- Owner: Amtrak
- Operator: SEPTA
- Line: Amtrak Philadelphia to Harrisburg Main Line (Keystone Corridor)
- Platforms: 2 side platforms
- Tracks: 4
- Connections: SEPTA City Bus: 44

Construction
- Parking: 111 spaces (daily)
- Cycle facilities: 3 racks (15 spaces)
- Accessible: No

Other information
- Fare zone: 2

History
- Rebuilt: 1980
- Electrified: September 11, 1915

Passengers
- 2017: 714 boardings 713 alightings (weekday average)
- Rank: 31 of 146

Services
Preceding station	SEPTA	Following station
Wynnewood toward Thorndale	Paoli/Thorndale Line	Merion toward Temple University
Former services
Preceding station	Amtrak	Following station
Ardmore toward Harrisburg	Keystone Service Until 1983	Overbrook toward Philadelphia–Suburban
Preceding station	Pennsylvania Railroad	Following station
Ardmore toward Chicago	Main Line	Philadelphia toward New York or Exchange Place
Wynnewood toward Paoli	Paoli Line	Merion toward Suburban Station
Location

Narberth station is a SEPTA Regional Rail station in Narberth, Pennsylvania. Located at Haverford and Narberth Avenues in Narberth, Pennsylvania, it serves most Paoli/Thorndale Line trains with the exception of several express runs.

The station was rebuilt around 1980 in a minimalist style common to that era, replacing a dilapidated wooden structure, under an agreement between SEPTA and the Narberth Borough Council, championed by Narberth Councilman Bharat Bhargava. The Ivy Ridge station was also built in the same style. A train crash occurred on the curve here on November 21, 1984, injuring 150 people.

The ticket office at this station is open weekdays 6:15 a.m. to 1:35 p.m. excluding holidays. There are 111 parking spaces at the station, with 3 bicycle racks accommodating up to 15 bicycles.

This station is in fare zone 2 and is 6.8 track miles from Suburban Station. In 2017, the average total weekday boardings at this station was 714, and the average total weekday alightings was 713.

== Station layout ==
Narberth has two low-level side platforms with pathways connecting the platforms to the inner tracks.
