= Ardmore station (Pennsylvania) =

Train station in Pennsylvania

Ardmore
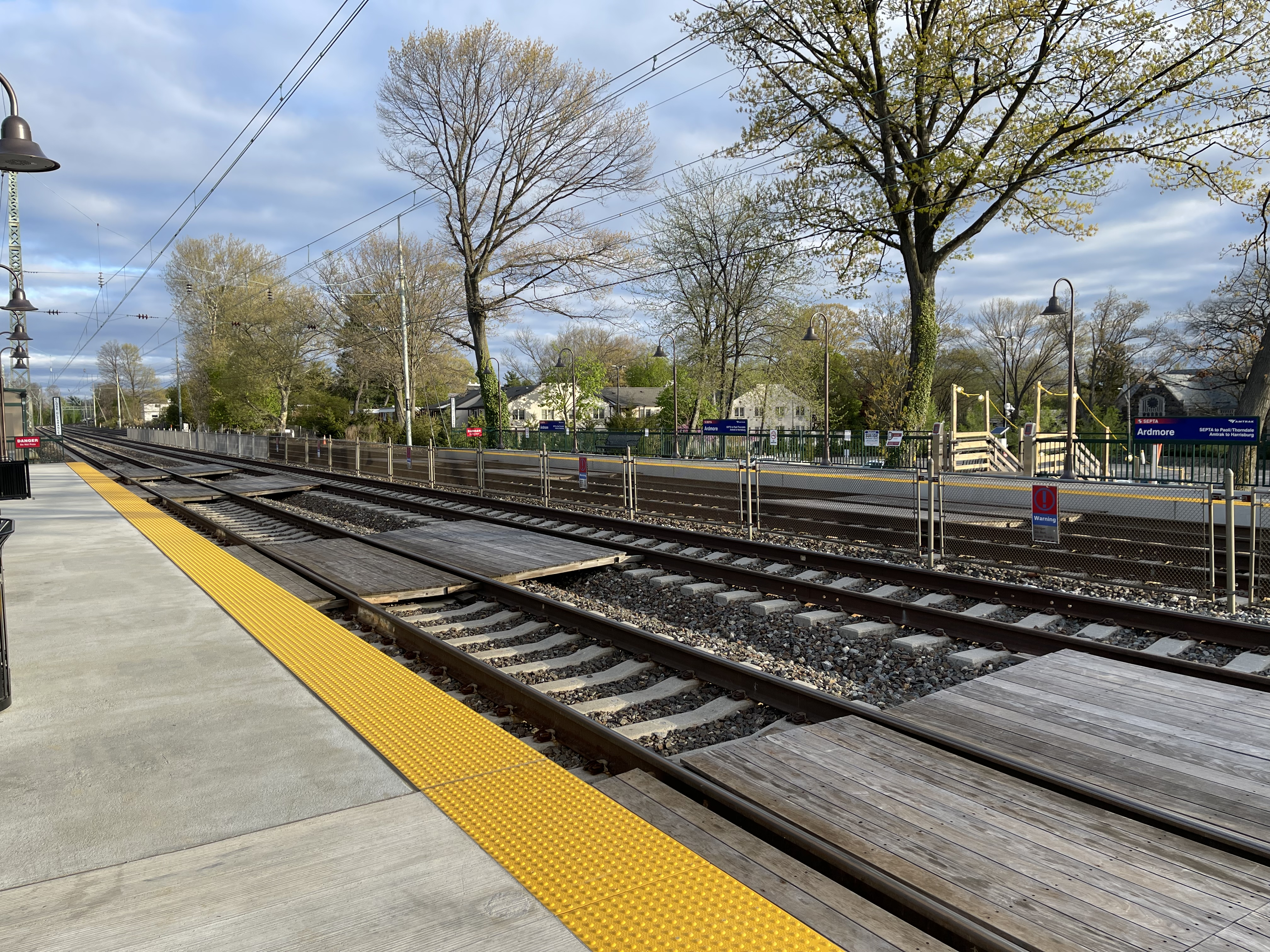
- The low-level platform at the renovated Ardmore station in April 2022.

General information
- Location: 39 Station Avenue; Ardmore, Pennsylvania; United States
- Coordinates: 40.0083°N 75.2903°W
- Owner: Amtrak
- Line: Amtrak Philadelphia to Harrisburg Main Line (Keystone Corridor)
- Platforms: 2 side platforms
- Tracks: 4
- Connections: SEPTA City Bus: 44; SEPTA Suburban Bus: 103, 105

Construction
- Parking: 196 spaces (109 permit, 87 public daily)
- Cycle facilities: 3 racks (12 spaces)
- Accessible: Yes

Other information
- Station code: Amtrak: ARD
- Fare zone: 2 (SEPTA)

History
- Opened: 1870
- Rebuilt: 1957, 2026
- Electrified: September 11, 1915

Passengers
- FY 2025: 80,900 (Amtrak)
- 2017: 821 boardings, 749 alightings (weekday average) (SEPTA)
- Rank: 22 of 146 (SEPTA)

Services
Preceding station	Amtrak	Following station
Paoli toward Harrisburg	Keystone Service	Philadelphia toward New York
Pennsylvanian does not stop here
Preceding station	SEPTA	Following station
Haverford toward Thorndale	Paoli/Thorndale Line	Wynnewood toward Temple University
Former services
Preceding station	Amtrak	Following station
Bryn Mawr toward Harrisburg	Keystone Service Before 1988	Narberth toward Philadelphia–Suburban
Paoli toward Pittsburgh	Pennsylvanian	Philadelphia toward New York
Preceding station	Pennsylvania Railroad	Following station
Haverford toward Chicago	Main Line	Narberth toward New York or Exchange Place
Haverford toward Paoli	Paoli Line	Wynnewood toward Suburban Station
Location

Ardmore station is a train station in Ardmore, Pennsylvania, located on the Pennsylvania Main Line. The station serves several Amtrak Keystone Service trains daily, as well as all SEPTA Paoli/Thorndale Line local regional rail trains. The station is 8.5 miles (13.7 km) from Suburban Station in Center City Philadelphia, and travel time to Suburban Station is 22 minutes on SEPTA local trains.

The station is situated in the Suburban Square shopping area amidst a large residential population.

In 2017, the average total weekday SEPTA boardings at this station was 821, and the average total weekday SEPTA alightings was 749.

== History ==
=== Original station ===
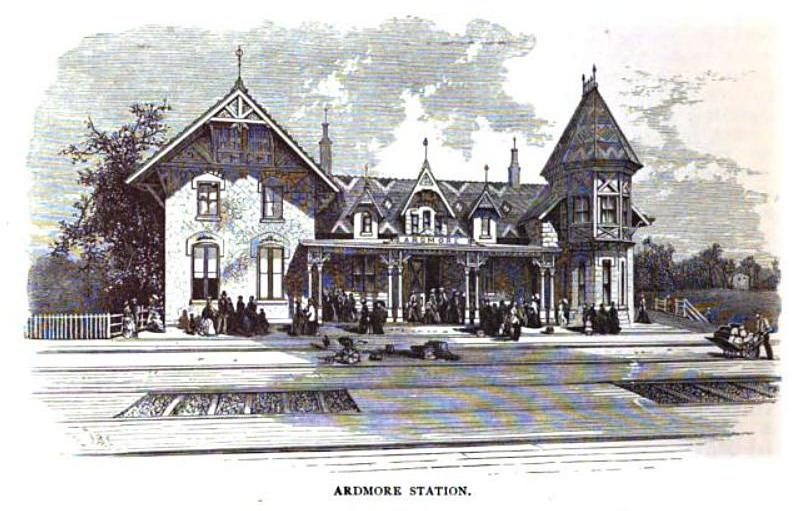
Ardmore station c. 1875

The original station at Ardmore was designed by the firm of Wilson Brothers and Company of Philadelphia as a two-story stone structure with a slate roof.

The walls were built of gneiss stone laid irregularly with sandstone lintels. It had a daylight basement by virtue of the land sloping to the rear, which served as housing for the agent, containing a bedroom, dining room, kitchen, and living room. The ground floor waiting room measured 20x35 feet, a ladies' room measuring 14x18 feet, a gentleman's smoking room 11x12 feet, a baggage room 8x12 feet, a telegraph office and ticket office of 9x18 feet, and a bedroom. The second story had three bedrooms and the signal tower.

=== Pennsylvania Railroad ===
The Pennsylvania Railroad operated commuter rail services at Ardmore until merging with the New York Central in 1968 becoming the Penn Central which then filed for bankruptcy in 1970. Conrail was then responsible for operating all the former PRR commuter rail services including over the Main Line to Paoli/Thorndale Line until 1983 when SEPTA took over all regional rail operations in South Eastern Pennsylvania.

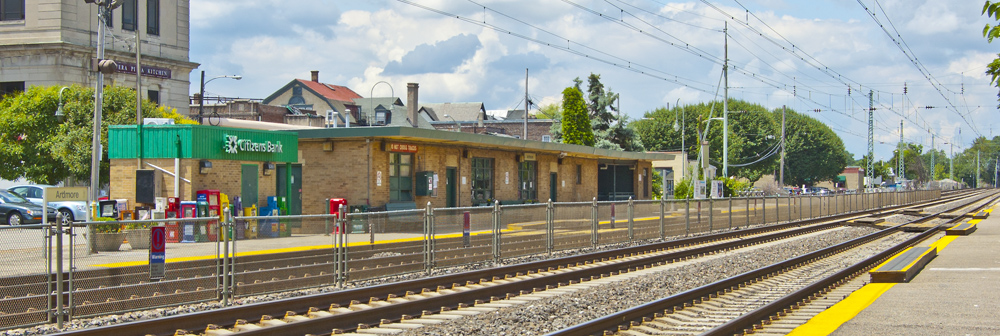
Old Ardmore station on Amtrak's Keystone Corridor Philadelphia-Harrisburg "Main Line", demolished April 2022

=== Transit-oriented development ===
Lower Merion Township has considered plans to replace the station as part of a larger economic revitalization "transit oriented development" (TOD) project for the neighborhood. Parts of the plan, however, relied on using eminent domain to force the purchase of private property, which would then be transferred to a private developer. For this reason, it met significant opposition among some members of community.

In 2008 the plan of developer Dranoff Properties for the TOD project was accepted and the Philadelphia-based company was named to develop a $180 million mixed use project for the station area with ground breaking anticipated in 2012. In August, 2010, the Redevelopment Assistance Capital Program of the State of Pennsylvania made a $9 million grant to the project following an earlier $6 million grant made in 2008.

== Station upgrade ==
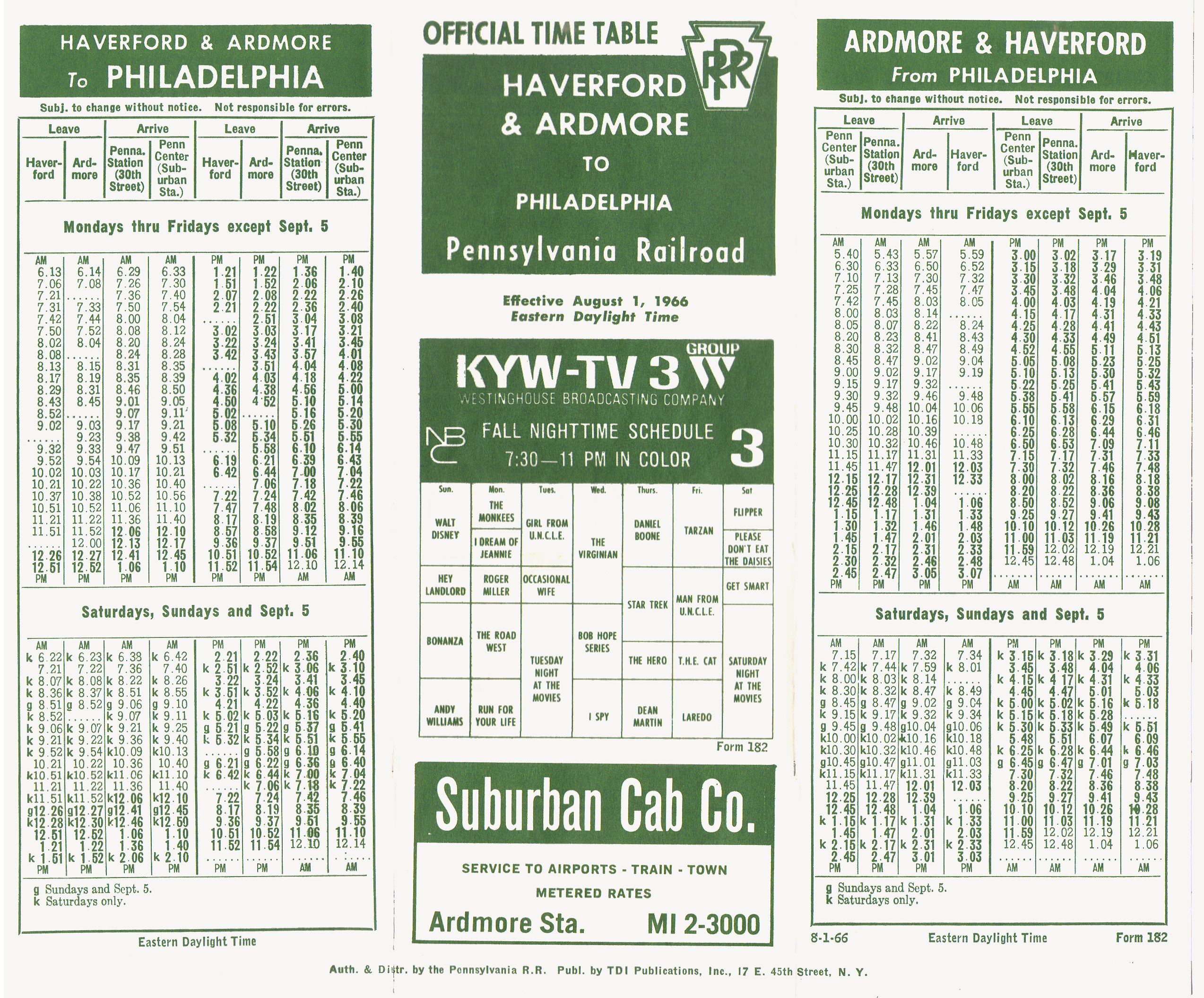
PRR commuter rail time table between Ardmore and Philadelphia, 1966

While Ardmore is the busiest station on the line, it was underdeveloped, consisting of only low-level platforms and small canopies. However, the station has completed a major upgrade, that brought high-level platforms, a full canopy, footbridge, and covered parking deck. The project started in January 2022.

== Station layout ==
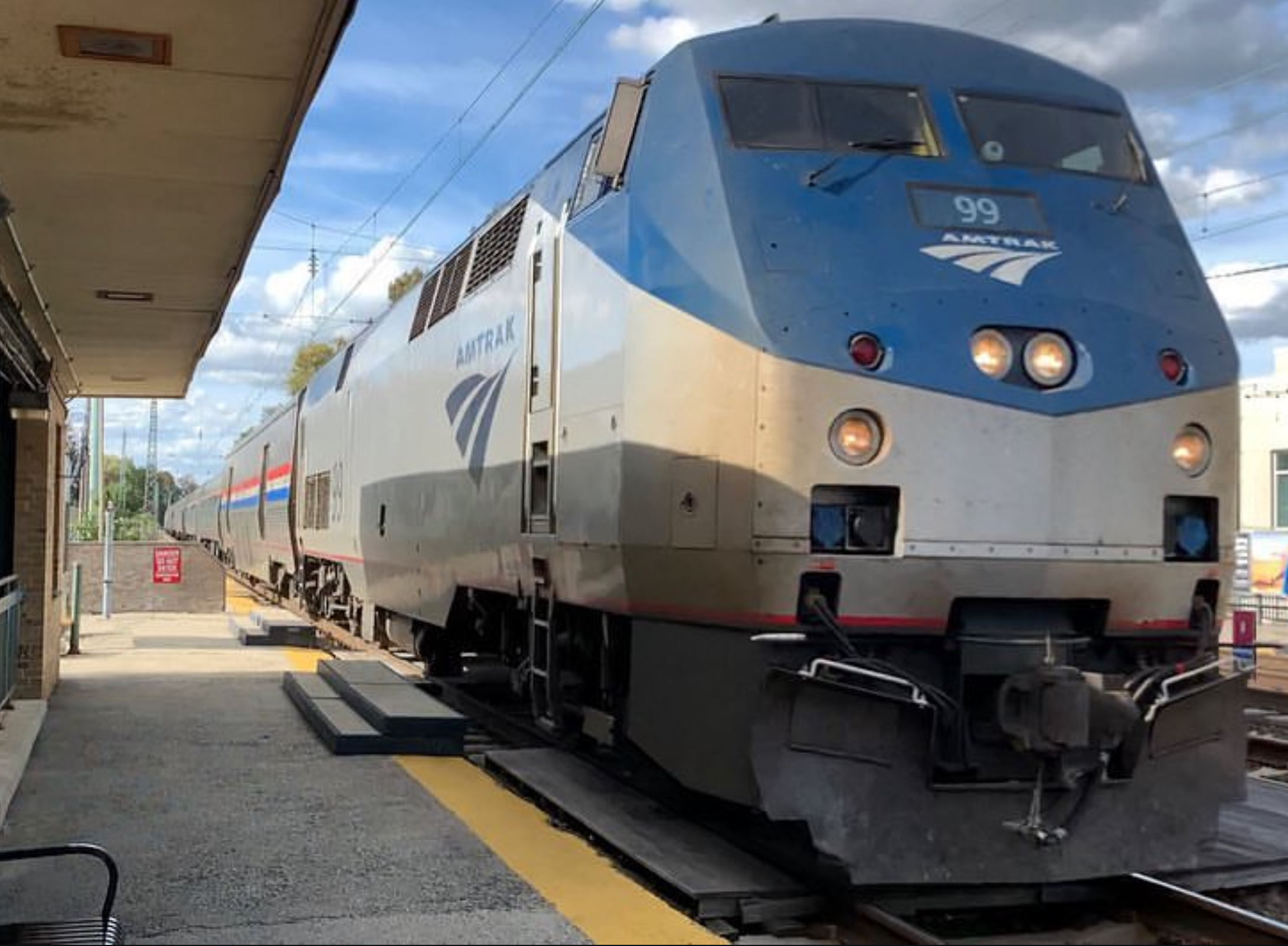
Amtrak GE-P42DC number 99 with an eastbound Pennsylvanian passing through Ardmore

An Amtrak QuikTrak machine is available in the station. SEPTA permit parking is available at the station, and the township provides additional metered parking in nearby lots. The station has two high-level side platforms with elevators and stairs connecting both platforms.
