= 13th Street station (SEPTA) =

Rapid transit station in Philadelphia

13th St
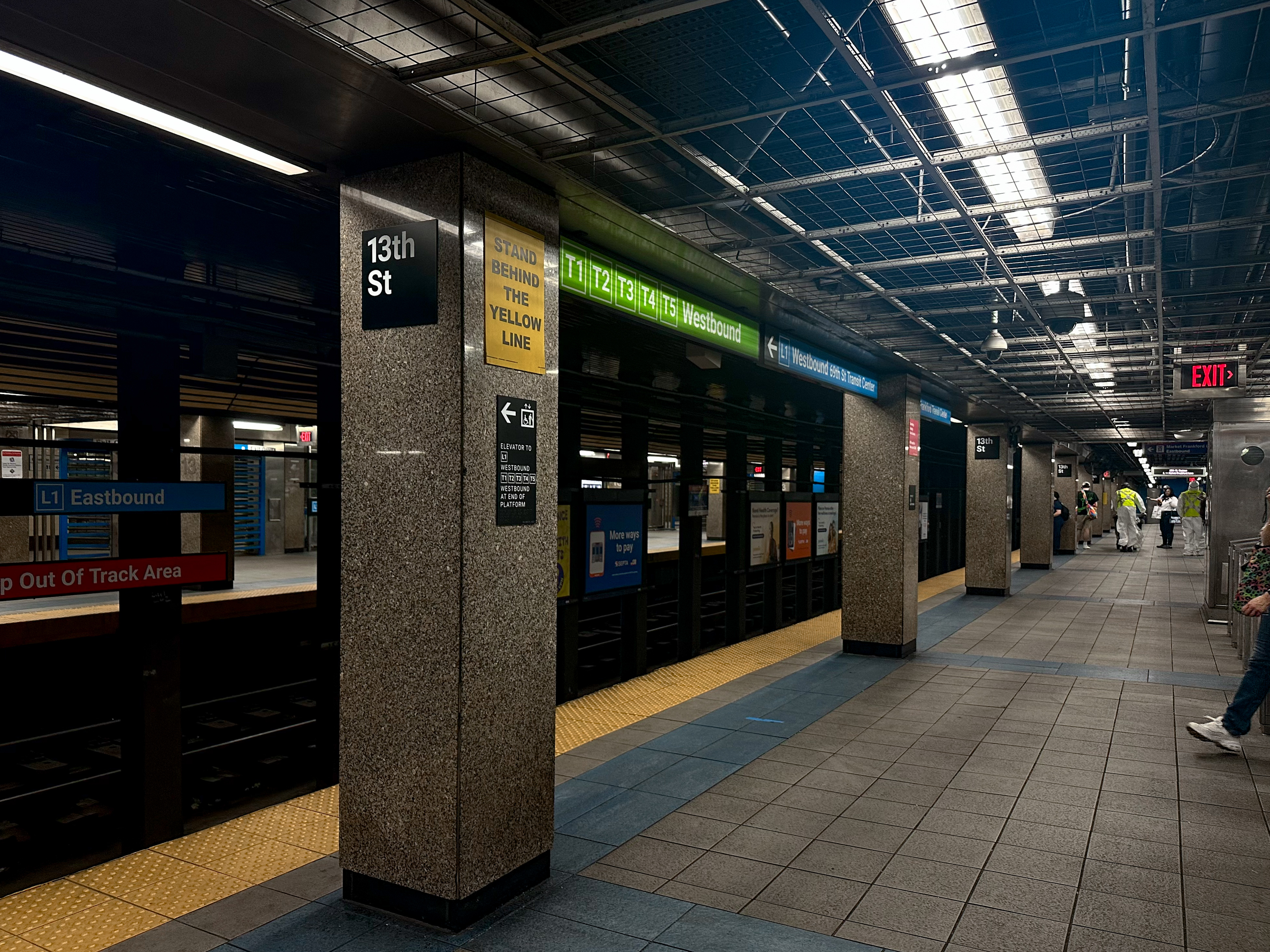
- 13th Street L1 Eastbound platform

General information
- Location: 13th and Market streets Philadelphia, Pennsylvania
- Coordinates: 39°57′7″N 75°9′41″W
- Owner: City of Philadelphia
- Operator: SEPTA
- Platforms: 3 side platforms
- Tracks: 2
- Connections: SEPTA City Bus: 17, 33, 38, 44, 48; SEPTA Suburban Bus: 124, 125; NJ Transit Bus: 316, 400, 401, 402, 404, 406, 408, 409, 410, 412, 414, 417, 555

Construction
- Structure type: Underground
- Accessible: L,T: Yes

History
- Opened: August 3, 1908; 118 years ago
- Former names: 13th/Juniper Streets; Juniper Street (subway–surface) (1908-2011)
Services
Preceding station	SEPTA Metro	Following station
15th Street/City Hall toward 69th Street T.C.	L (SEPTA Metro)	8th–Market toward Frankford T.C.
15th Street/City Hall toward 69th Street T.C.	L (SEPTA Metro)	11th Street Temporarily closed toward Frankford T.C.
15th Street/City Hall toward 63rd–Malvern/Overbrook	T1 (SEPTA Metro)	Terminus
15th Street/City Hall toward 61st–Baltimore/Angora	T2 (SEPTA Metro)	Terminus
15th Street/City Hall toward Yeadon or Darby T.C.	T3 (SEPTA Metro)	Terminus
15th Street/City Hall toward Darby T.C.	T4 (SEPTA Metro)	Terminus
15th Street/City Hall toward 80th Street/Eastwick	T5 (SEPTA Metro)	Terminus
Location

13th Street station is a SEPTA rapid transit station in Philadelphia, Pennsylvania, located under Market Street between 12th and Juniper streets in Center City. The station serves the SEPTA Metro L and is the eastern terminal station for all five routes of the T.

13th Street is located on the east side of City Hall and Penn Square and is connected to the Downtown Link concourse, a collection of underground passageways serving multiple stations on the L, B, PATCO Speedline, and Regional Rail lines. The station is also served by bus routes operated by SEPTA's City Transit Division and Suburban Division, as well as NJ Transit Bus routes.

The T platform was known as Juniper Street until 2011. The station was signed as 13th/Juniper Streets on maps at the time.

== History ==
The station opened on August 3, 1908, as part of the first extension of the Philadelphia Rapid Transit Company's Market Street subway. The line had originally opened a year earlier between 69th Street and 15th Street stations.

The Downtown Link and associated underground corridors surrounding the station are expected to undergo a two-year renovation project in conjunction with renovations to the B 15th Street/City Hall station platforms.

== L platforms ==
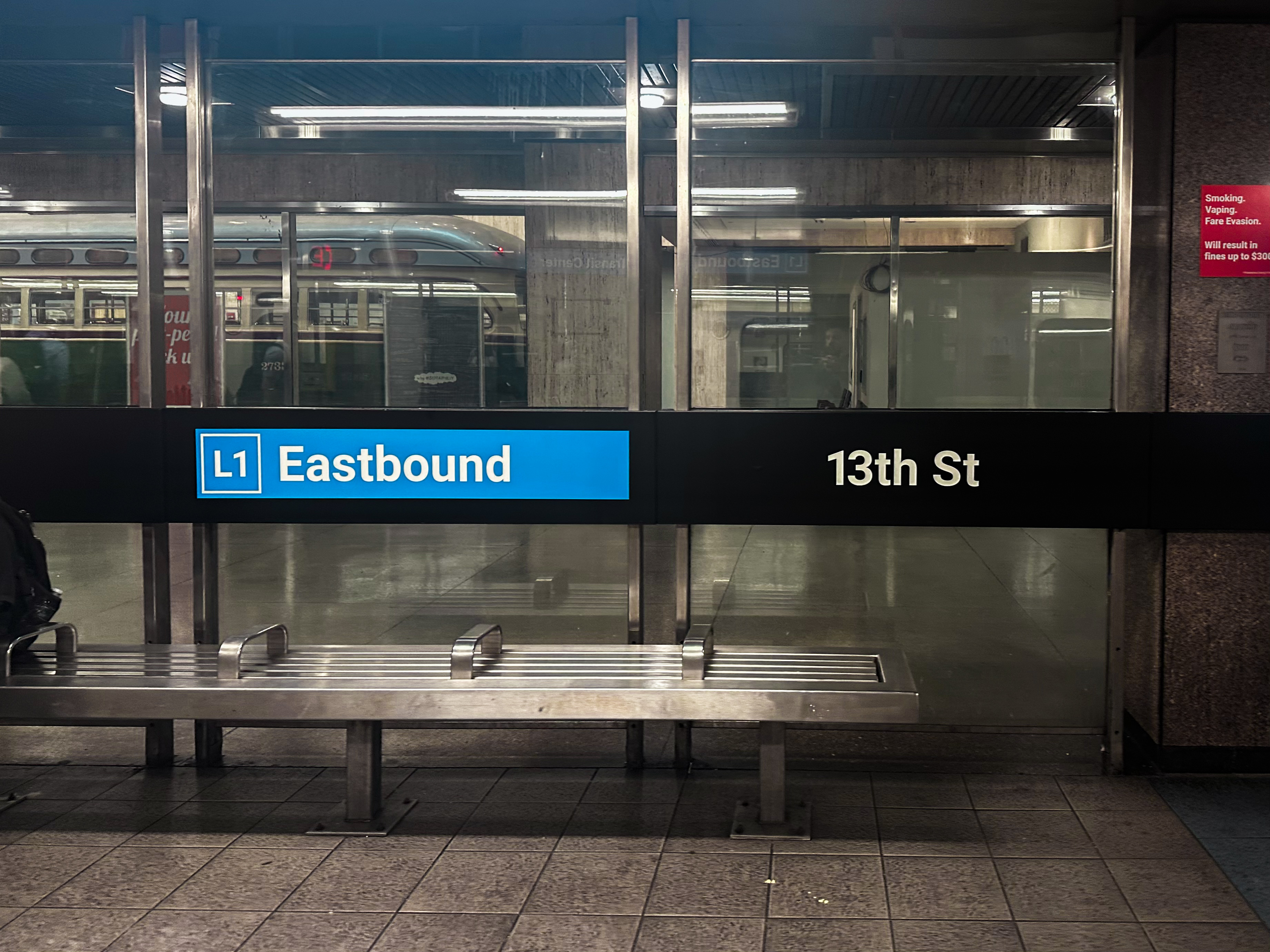
L1 Eastbound fare zone dividers with original PTC trolley in SEPTA headquarters

The L platforms are located one floor below ground level, connected to the Downtown Link concourse. The south concourse, accessible from the eastbound platform, features direct underground access to SEPTA's headquarters and transit museum, located at 1234 Market Street. Market–Frankford trains continue west via Market Street across the Schuylkill River to serve West Philadelphia and Upper Darby, and continue east along Market until Front Street, turning north towards Northeast Philadelphia.

== T platform ==
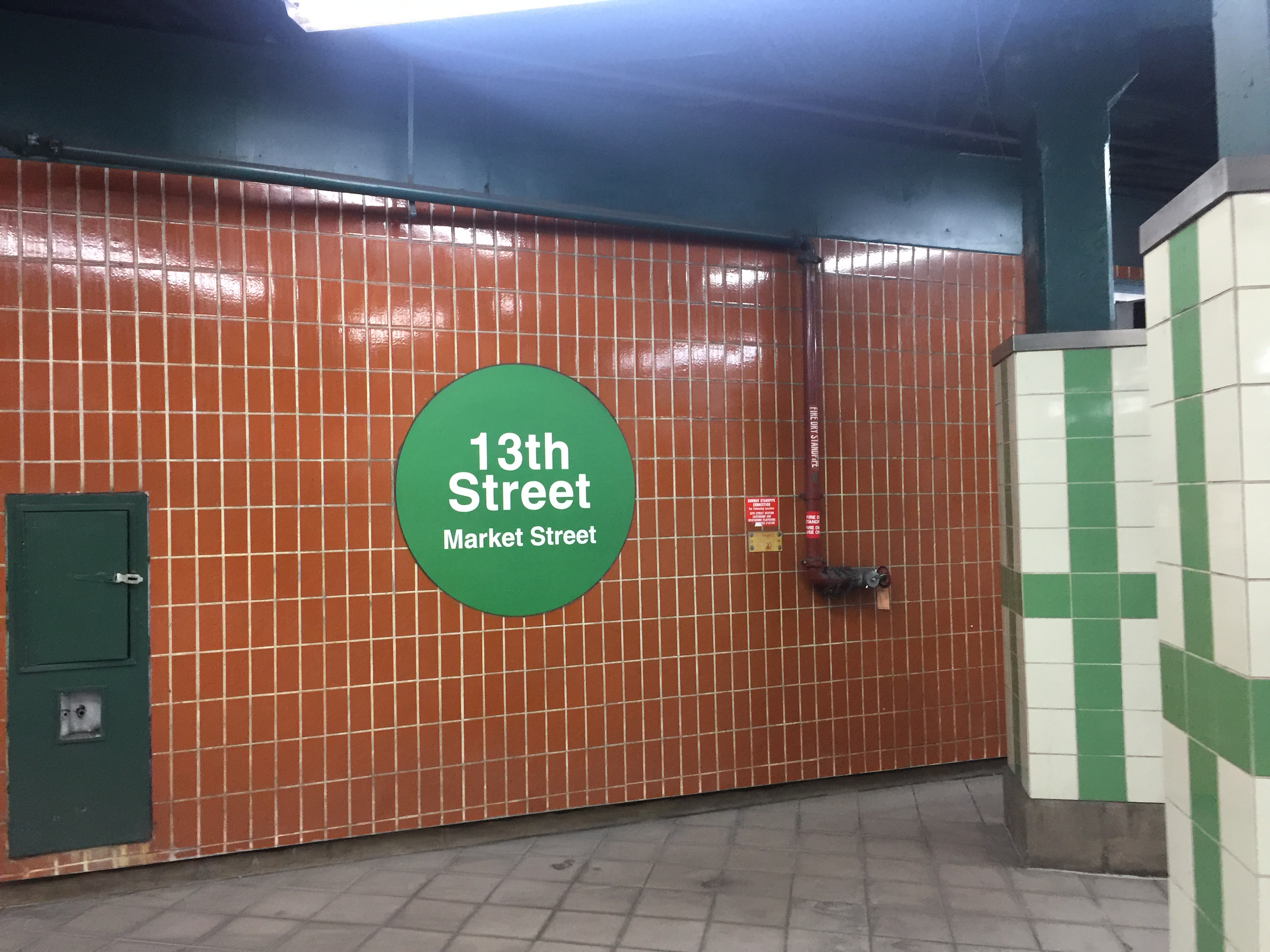
Subway–surface platform in 2017, showing the station's current name

The platform for all T routes is located two stories below ground level. The station is located at the end of the subway–surface line on a balloon loop parallel to Juniper Street and features a single track with all trolleys operating in the same direction.

Inbound trolleys discharge passengers on the southernmost portion of the platform. The trolleys then proceed to pick up passengers at two separate boarding areas along the platform. T1, T2, and T3 board at the northernmost portion of the platform. T4 and T5 board further south towards the center of the platform. Upon departure of the station, the track wraps around and heads west towards 15th St/City Hall station. It also features a short spur track to the northeast that was formerly used to park occasional stranded or dead trolleys. The track was recently disconnected from the main line due to unsuccessful attempts to tie it into the trolleys' communications-based train control signaling system.

== Station layout ==
The stations has two high-level side platforms for the Market–Frankford trains and one low-level side platform for subway–surface trolleys. Fare control and Downtown Link concourse access are both on the upper platform level.

== Image gallery ==
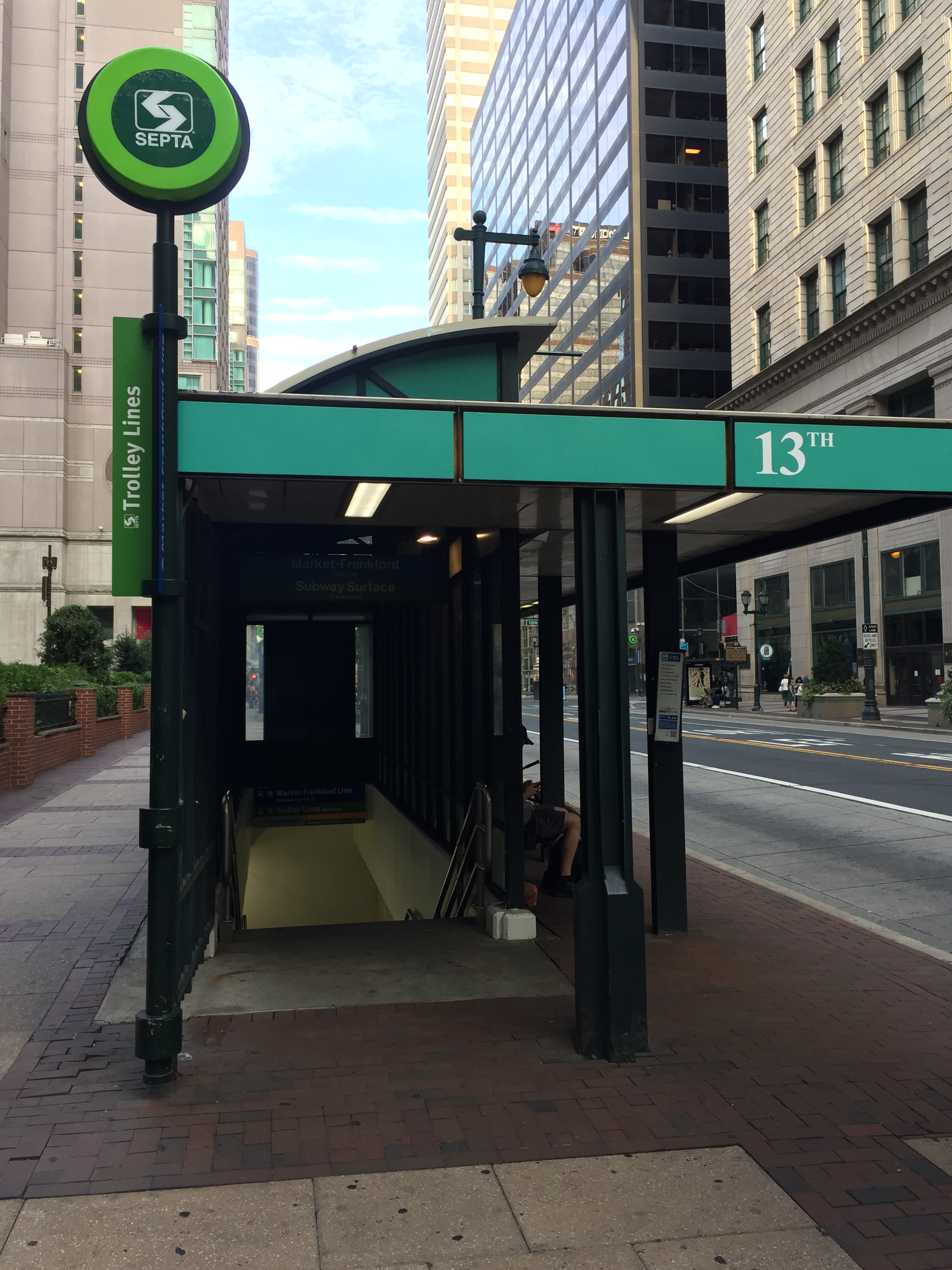
Headhouse and bus stop on the northeast corner of 13th & Market streets (Pre-Metro Era)

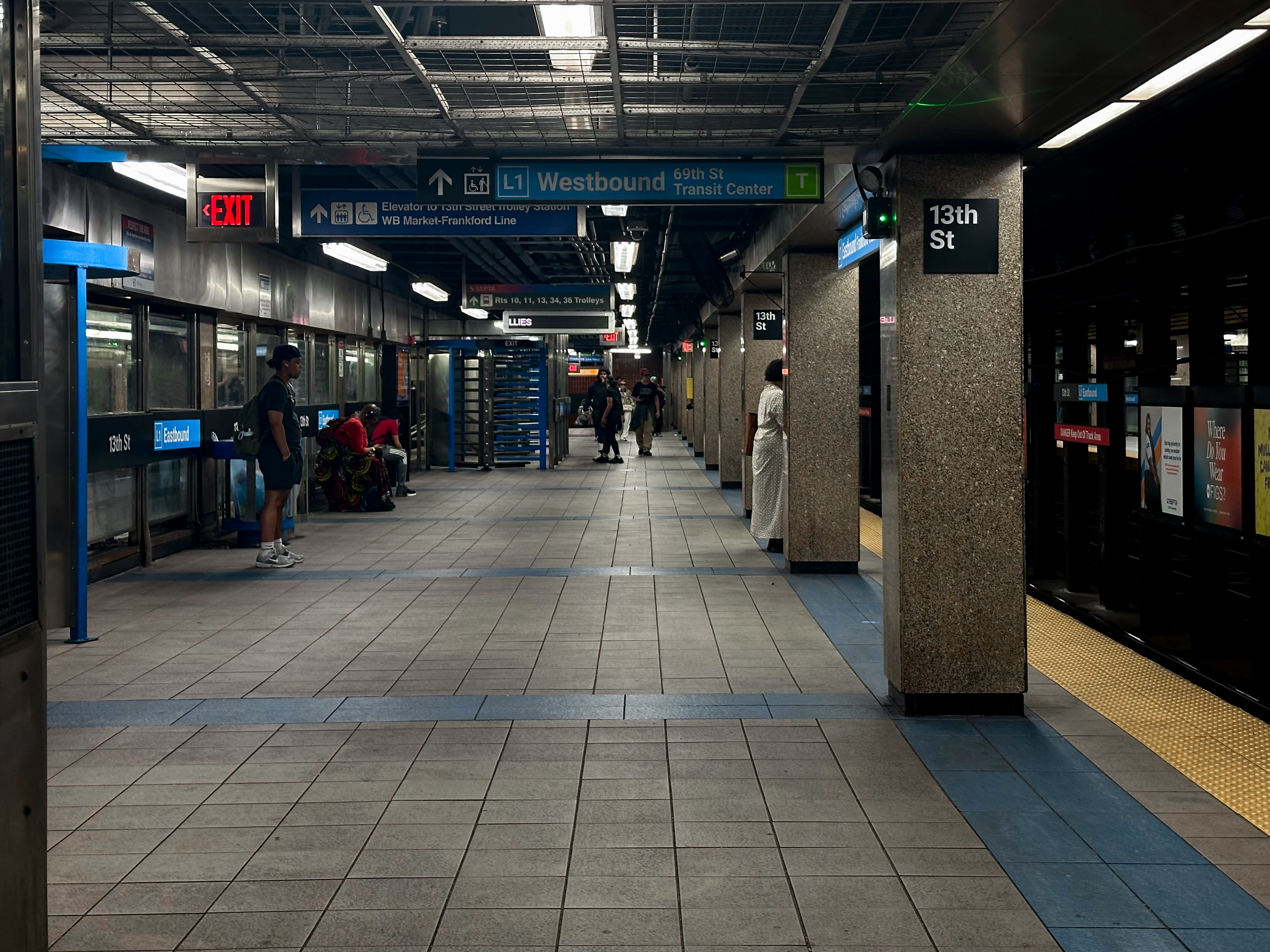
L1 Eastbound Platform

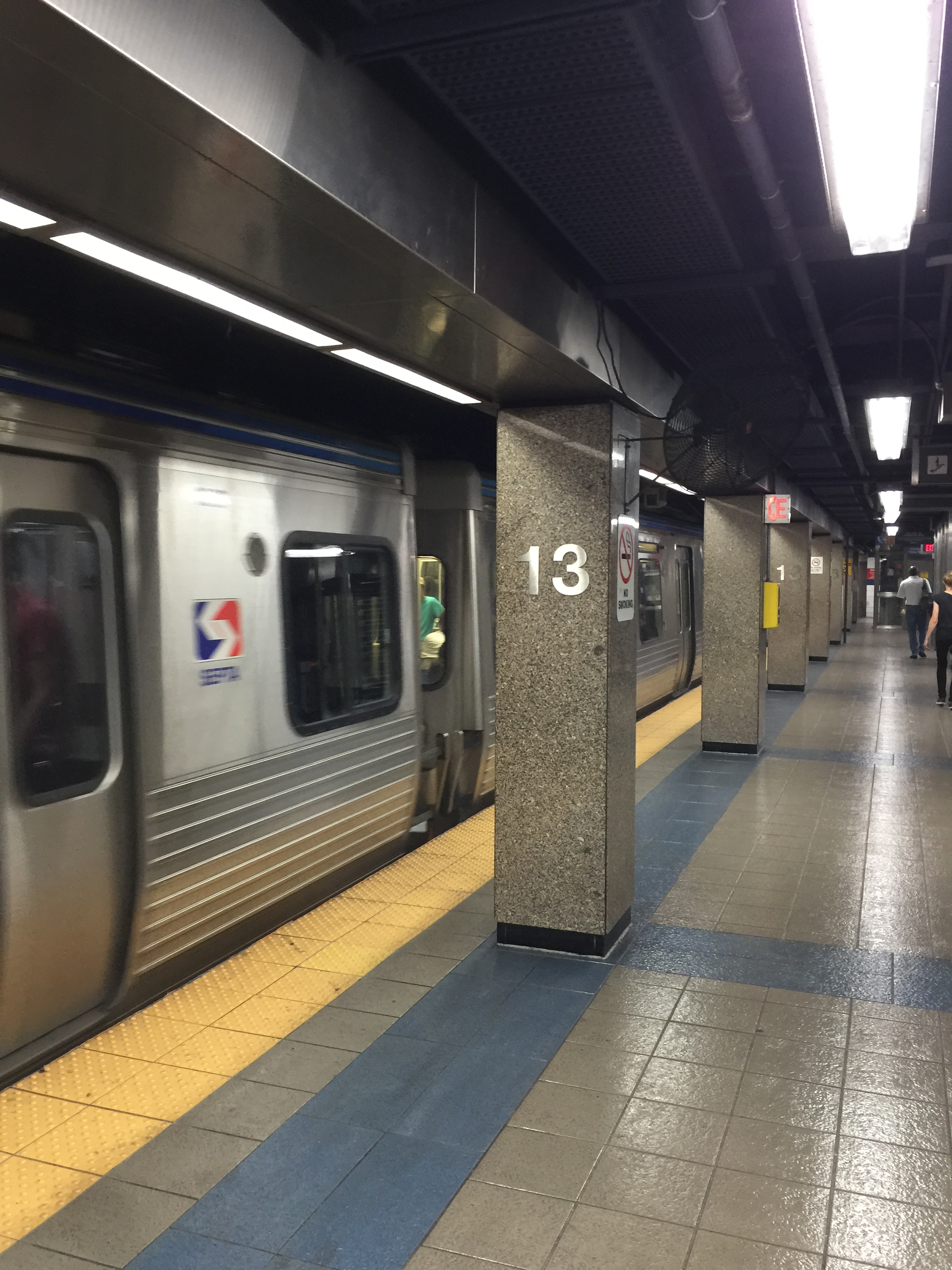
L1 Eastbound Platform with L train during 2018

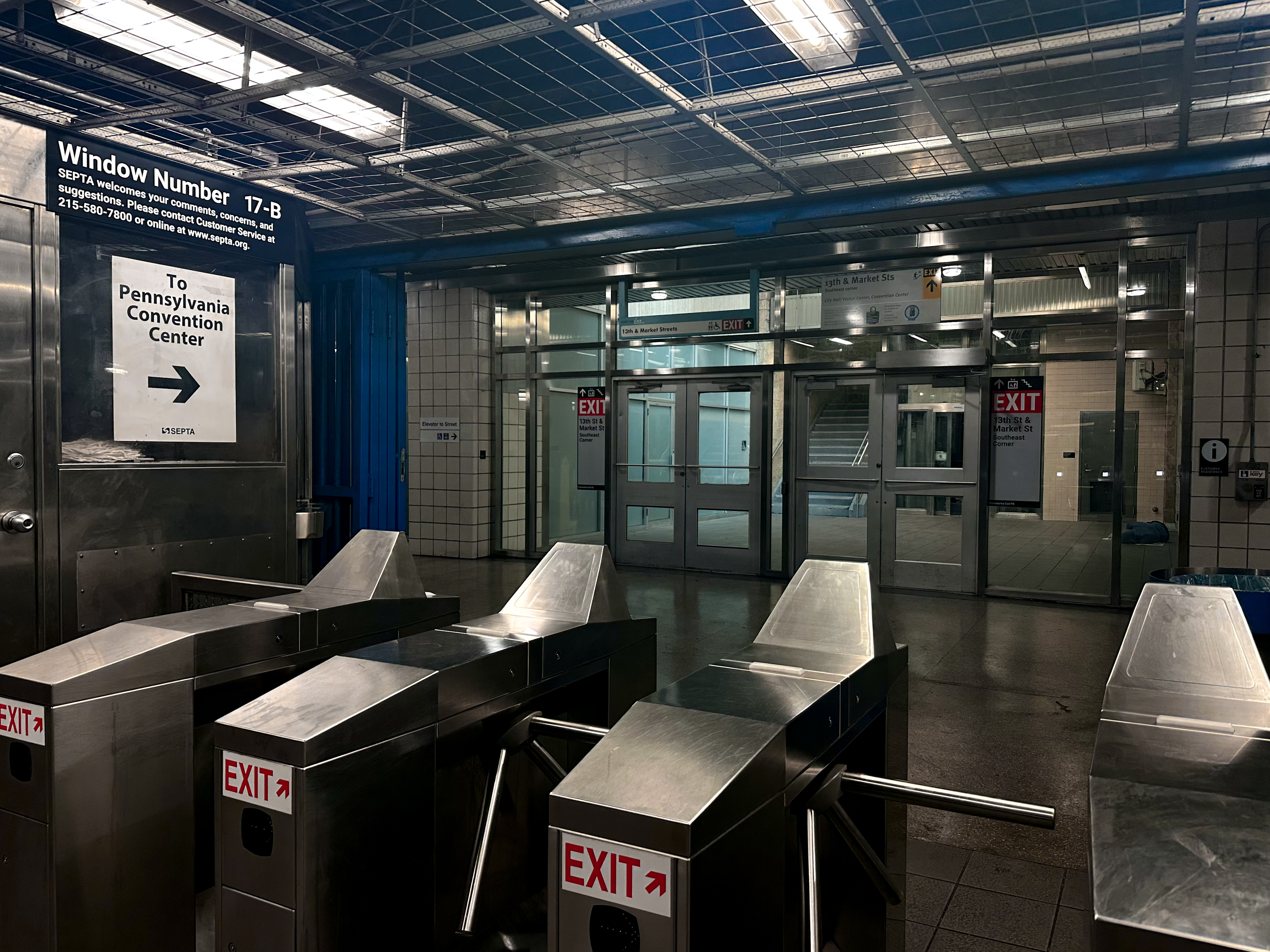
Turnstiles

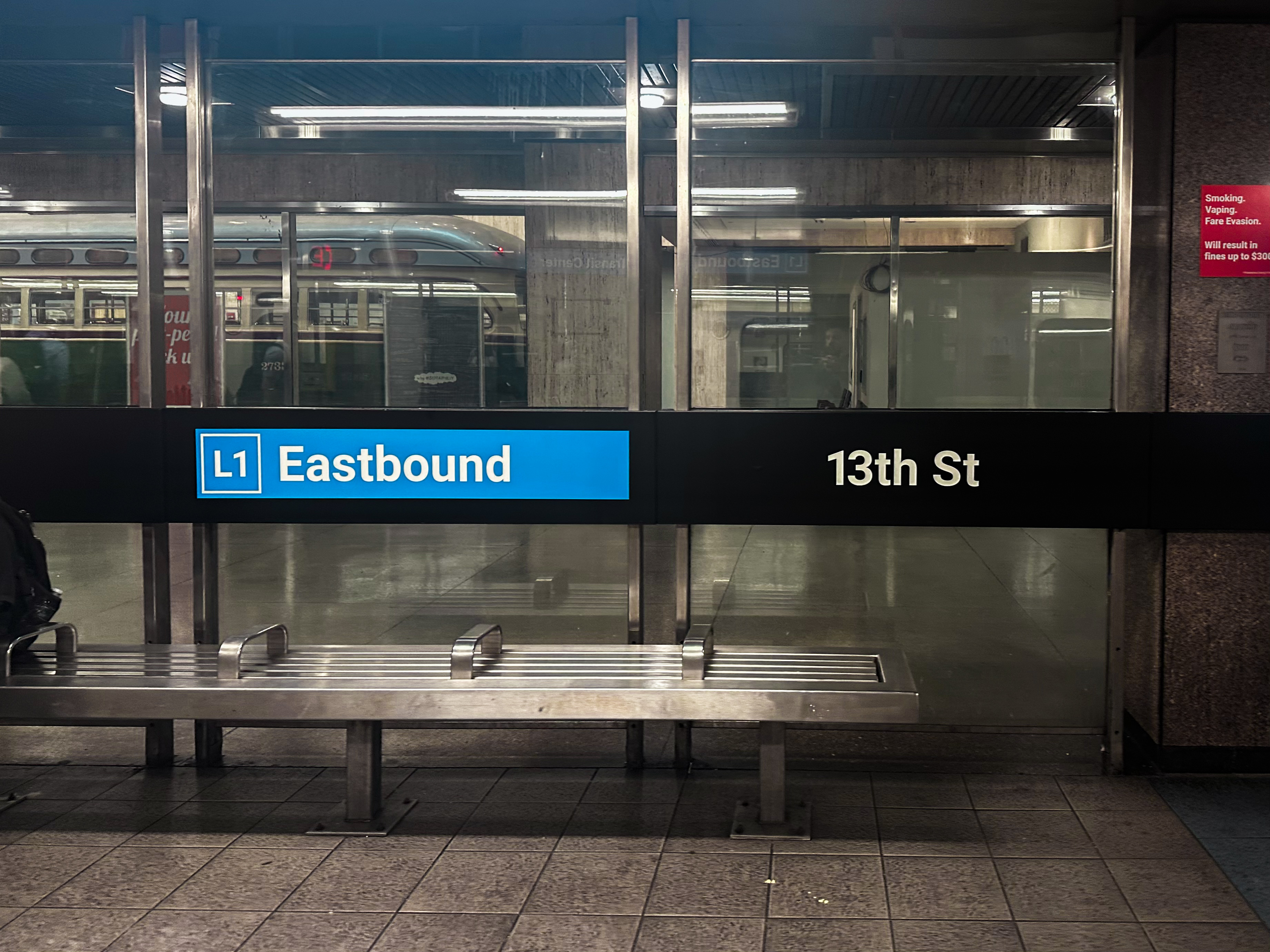
Eastbound Platform (Metro Era)

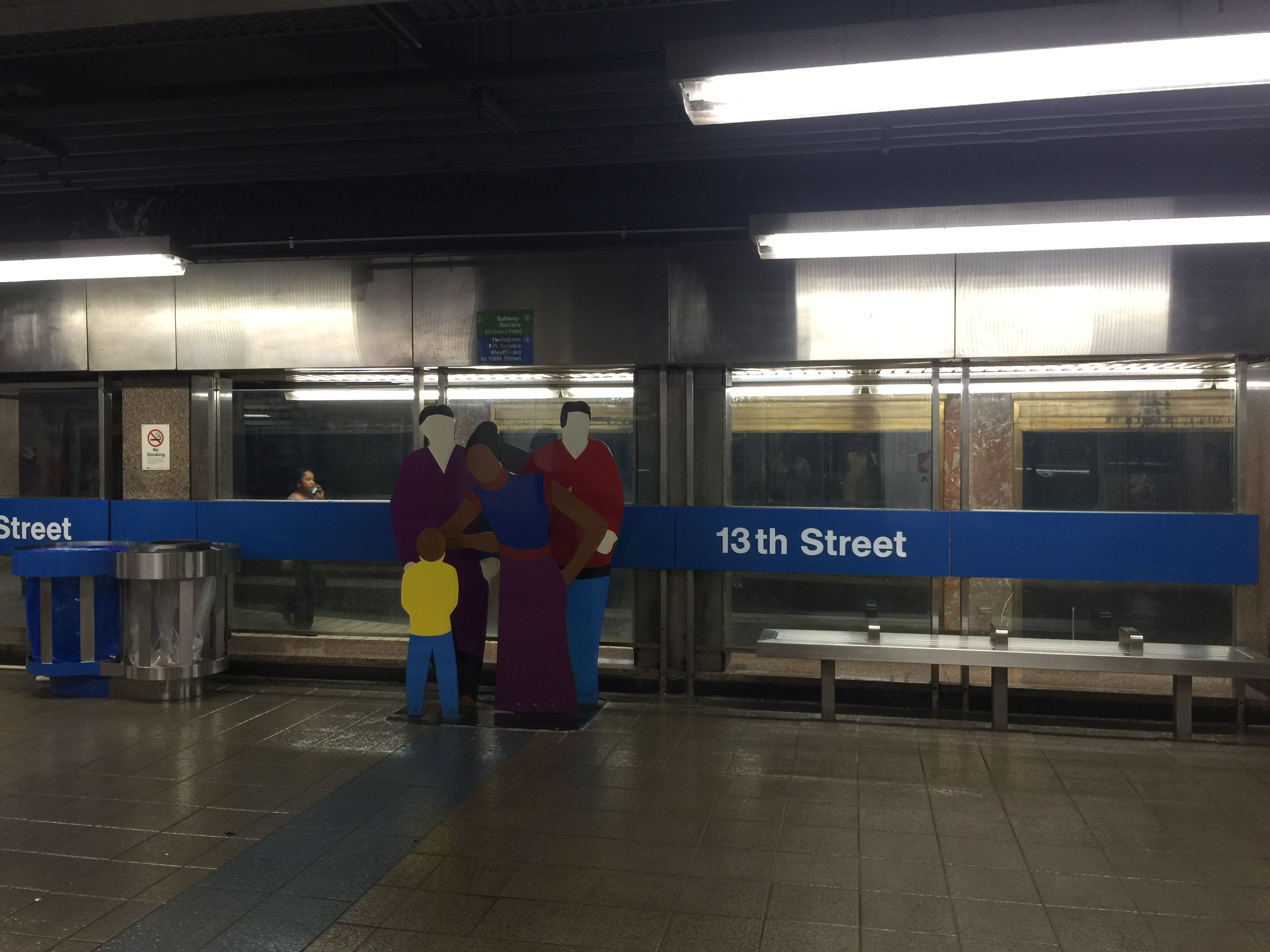
Eastbound Platform 2 (Pre-Metro Era)
