= Paoli station =

Train station in Paoli, Pennsylvania

Paoli
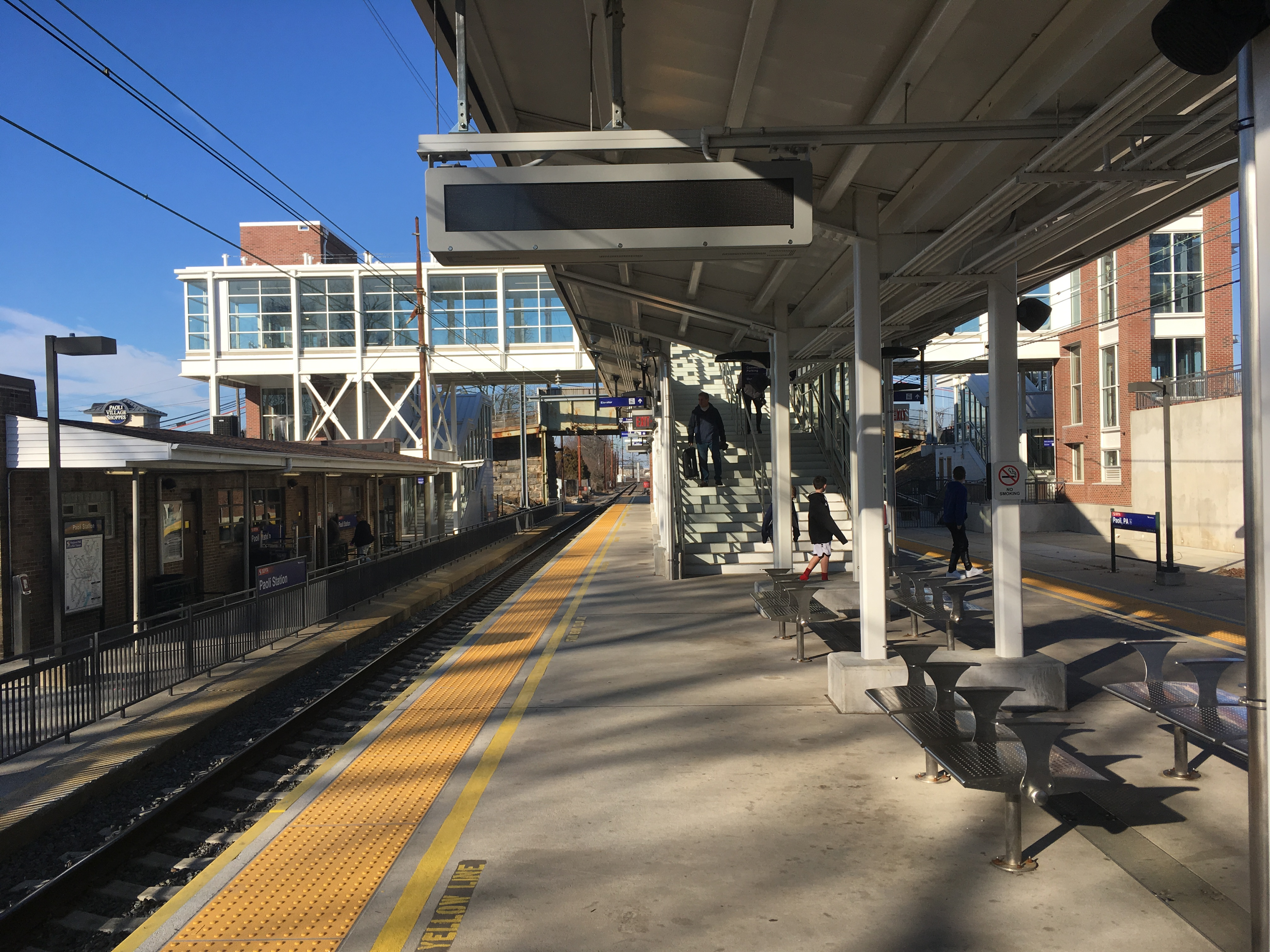
- Paoli station in 2020

General information
- Location: 13 North Valley Road; Paoli, Pennsylvania; United States
- Coordinates: 40.04295°N 75.4837°W
- Owner: Amtrak
- Line: Amtrak Philadelphia to Harrisburg Main Line (Keystone Corridor)
- Platforms: 1 island platform
- Tracks: 2
- Connections: SEPTA Suburban Bus: 92, 105, 204, 206

Construction
- Parking: 486 spaces (177 daily, 309 permit)
- Cycle facilities: 4 racks (8 spaces)
- Accessible: yes

Other information
- Station code: Amtrak: PAO
- Fare zone: 4 (SEPTA)

History
- Opened: 1893
- Rebuilt: 1953, 2016-2019
- Electrified: September 11, 1915

Passengers
- FY 2025: 243,995 annually (Amtrak)
- 2017: 1,114 boardings 1,136 alightings (weekday average) (SEPTA)
- Rank: 15 of 146 (SEPTA)

Services
Preceding station	Amtrak	Following station
Exton toward Harrisburg	Keystone Service	Ardmore toward New York
Lancaster toward Pittsburgh	Pennsylvanian	Philadelphia toward New York
Preceding station	SEPTA	Following station
Malvern toward Thorndale	Paoli/Thorndale Line	Daylesford toward Temple University
Former services
Preceding station	Amtrak	Following station
Lancaster toward Chicago	Three Rivers 1995–2005	Philadelphia toward New York
Lancaster toward Chicago	Broadway Limited Until 1995	Philadelphia toward New York
Malvern toward Harrisburg	Keystone Service Before 1988	Wayne toward Philadelphia–Suburban
Lancaster toward Kansas City	National Limited	North Philadelphia toward New York
Preceding station	Pennsylvania Railroad	Following station
Green Tree toward Chicago	Main Line	Berwyn toward New York or Exchange Place
Terminus	Paoli Line	Daylesford toward Suburban Station
Location

Paoli station is a passenger rail station located in the western suburbs of Philadelphia at 13 North Valley Road, Paoli, Pennsylvania, at the intersection of North Valley Road and Lancaster Avenue (US Route 30). It is served by Amtrak's Keystone Service and Pennsylvanian trains, and most SEPTA Paoli/Thorndale Line trains.

The station has Amtrak and SEPTA ticket offices, a waiting room, vending machines, restrooms, and a coffee shop.

== History ==
This one-story, tan brick building was constructed by the Pennsylvania Railroad in 1953 at a cost of $140,000; it replaced an earlier Victorian depot that was built in 1893.

It is 19.9 miles (32.0 km) track from Philadelphia's Suburban Station. In 2017, the average total weekday SEPTA boardings at this station was 1,114 and the average total weekday SEPTA alightings was 1,136.

== Paoli Intermodal Transportation Center Project ==
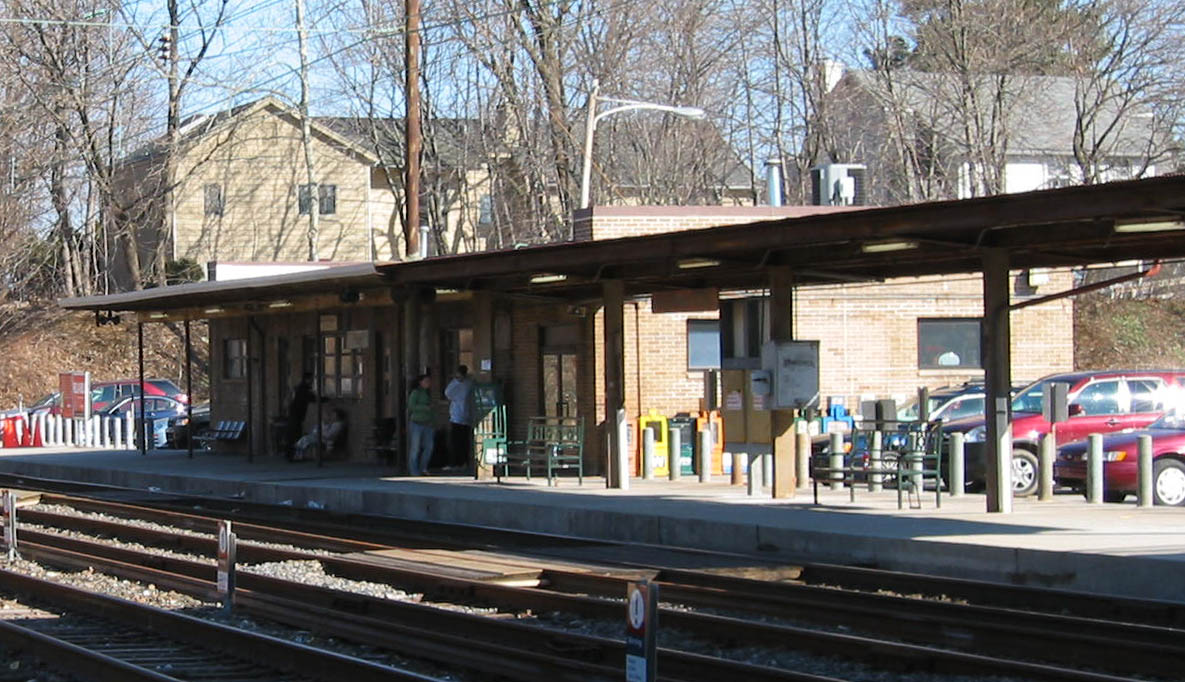
Station prior to 2018 construction

The Paoli Intermodal Transportation Center (ITC) Project was proposed as a relocation and expansion of the Paoli station to a new site near the existing facility. Improvements in the plans for the new intermodal transportation center included a bridge over the rail tracks (Darby Road which will replace Valley Road), renovation or replacement of the existing station building, new passenger waiting and ticketing facilities, passenger amenities, bus, shuttle, passenger parking facilities, and potential new retail and commercial business development.

Construction for the first phase of the upgraded station commenced in February 2017. The first phase, which cost $48 million, made the station compliant with the Americans with Disabilities Act by replacing the two low-level side platforms with a high-level island platform, constructing a pedestrian overpass over the tracks, and adding elevators and ramps. A ribbon-cutting ceremony for the first phase of the project was held on September 23, 2019, with Amtrak and SEPTA officials, disability rights groups, and area politicians in attendance. The second phase of the station project will replace the North Valley Road bridge. The third phase will turn the station into an intermodal transportation facility by constructing a high-level side platform adjacent to the outbound track, additional amenities for passengers, bus depot facilities, and a parking garage.

== Other future plans ==
The canceled light rail Greenline would have connected Paoli station with the towns of Phoenixville and Oaks, Pennsylvania.

== Station layout ==
Paoli has one center high-level island platform with an overpass allowing passengers to travel from the center platform to the ground level. Some SEPTA trains terminate/originate here. Originally, the station had four tracks, however the center tracks were removed in 2017 to allow for the construction of the center high-level platform.
