= Thorndale station (SEPTA) =

Rail station in Caln Township, Pennsylvania

Thorndale
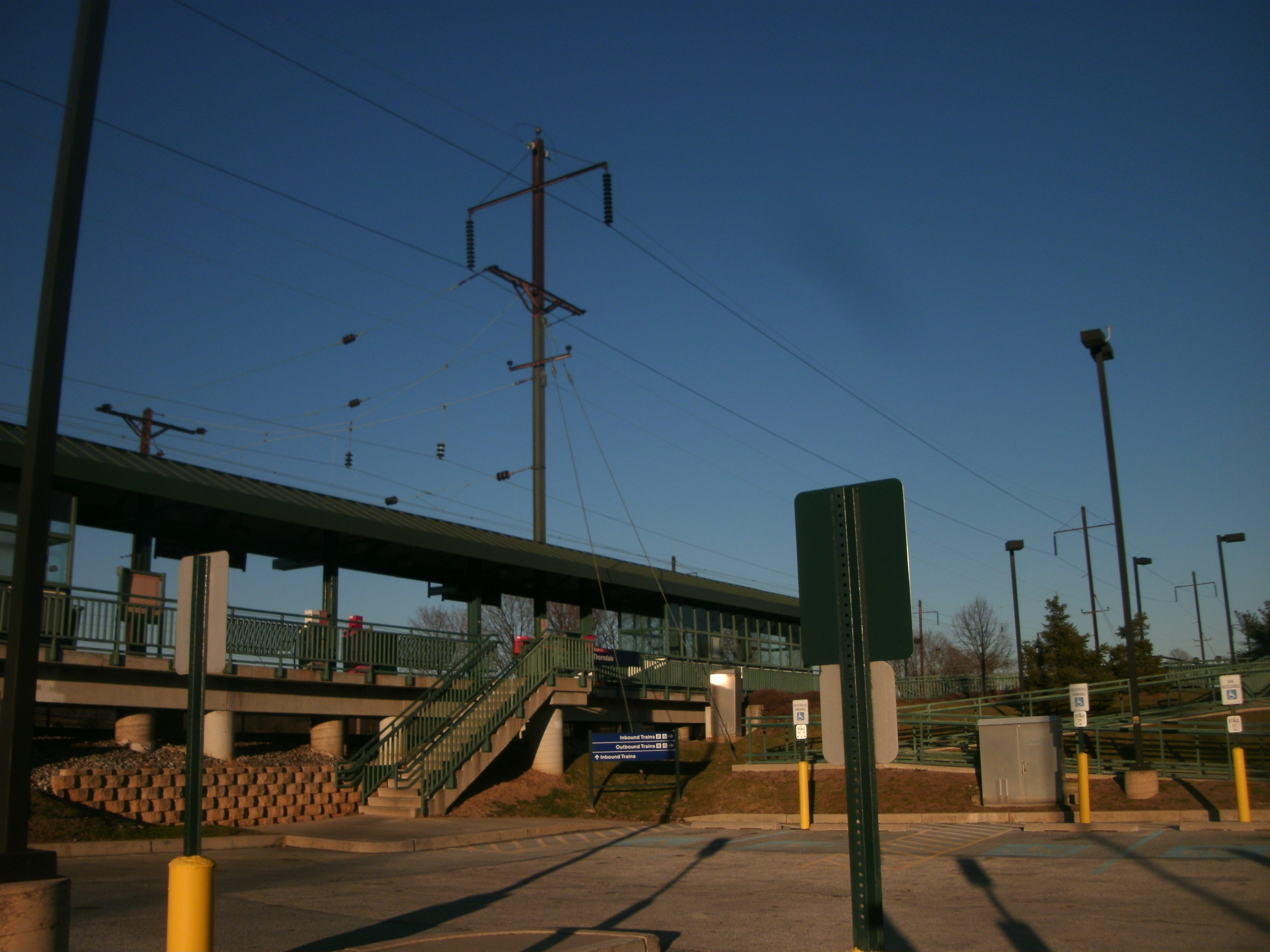
- Thorndale station from street level

General information
- Location: 201 South Bailey Road; Thorndale, Pennsylvania; United States
- Coordinates: 39°59′33″N 75°45′45″W
- Owner: Amtrak
- Operator: SEPTA
- Line: Amtrak Philadelphia to Harrisburg Main Line (Keystone Corridor)
- Platforms: 2 side platforms
- Tracks: 4
- Connections: SEPTA Suburban Bus: 135

Construction
- Parking: 447 spaces
- Cycle facilities: 7 rack spaces
- Accessible: Yes

Other information
- Fare zone: 4

History
- Opened: November 22, 1999

Passengers
- 2017: 427 boardings, 352 alightings (weekday average)
- Rank: 59 of 146

Services
Preceding station	SEPTA	Following station
Terminus	Paoli/Thorndale Line	Downingtown toward Temple University
Location

Thorndale station is a SEPTA Regional Rail station in Thorndale, Pennsylvania. Located on South Bailey Road and East Lincoln Highway (U.S. 30 Business), it serves the Paoli/Thorndale Line. While Thorndale station is the terminus of SEPTA's Paoli/Thorndale Line service, the tracks continue (with service by Amtrak), to points west, including Lancaster, Harrisburg, and Pittsburgh. Amtrak does not stop at Thorndale.

This station is 35.2 track miles from Philadelphia's Suburban Station. In 2017, the average total weekday boardings at this station was 427, and the average total weekday alightings was 374.

== History ==
The R5 line (now Paoli/Thorndale Line) originally ended further west in Parkesburg, but service was cut back to Downingtown in 1996. Thorndale station opened on November 22, 1999 as an extension of the R5 service from Downingtown. The station was built to serve the rapidly growing population of Chester County and reduce congestion on area roads.

== Station layout ==
There is no ticket office at this station. There are 447 parking spaces at the station for daily parking as well as SEPTA permit parking. The station is equipped with bathroom facilities, however, they are locked and only for the use of train crews.

This station is wheelchair-accessible. There is a low level platform with a short high level section for accessibility on one side and a fully high level platform on the other. The platforms have bridge plates which allow a wheelchair to cross the gap between the platform and the train when it is stopped at the platform.

As a result of Thorndale being the line's terminus, trains terminate and depart from both platforms.

== Services ==
In SEPTA's current weekday schedule, 13 trains depart from Thorndale and 12 trains arrive. On Saturdays, 9 trains depart from Thorndale and 9 trains arrive. All of SEPTA's trains terminate at Malvern on Sundays and therefore don't serve Thorndale among other stations not served on Sundays. Due to Thorndale being the final stop of the line, trains are often forced to crossover to the platform on the other side of the tracks. Trains at and near Thorndale also spend a significant amount of time waiting for other trains to pass.
