= West Chester Transit Center =

Bus terminal and parking garage in Pennsylvania, US

Coordinates: 39.9579°N 75.6074°W

- View inside the West Chester Transportation Center.

General information
- Location: 220 W. Market Street; West Chester, PA 19382
- Lines: SEPTA Suburban Bus: Route 92 to King of Prussia; Route 104 to 69th Street; Route 135 to Coatesville; TMACC: SCCOOT to Oxford

Construction
- Accessible: yes

History
- Opened: 2006
Location

The West Chester Transit Center is a bus terminal and parking garage in West Chester, Pennsylvania. The $1,250,000 transportation center, upon which construction began in October 2004, was opened in December 2005. It is located on Market Street across from the Chester County Justice Center.

SEPTA bus routes 92 and 104 started to run from the Transportation Center beginning February 13, 2006. Bus route 92 connects West Chester with the King of Prussia Transit Center at the King of Prussia Mall via Malvern Borough and the Paoli Train Station. Bus route 104 connects West Chester University with Upper Darby's 69th Street Transportation Center. On August 1, 2021, SEPTA began bus route 135 from West Chester to Exton, Downingtown, and Coatesville, replacing Krapf's Transit's "A" bus.

In addition to the SEPTA operated services, SCCOOT (operated by Krapf's Transit for the Transportation Management Association of Chester County), which provides service between West Chester and Southern Chester County, also uses the Center.

The garage has 157 parking spaces available for use, the majority of which are reserved during normal business hours for county employees.
