= King of Prussia Mall =

Shopping mall in Pennsylvania, U.S.

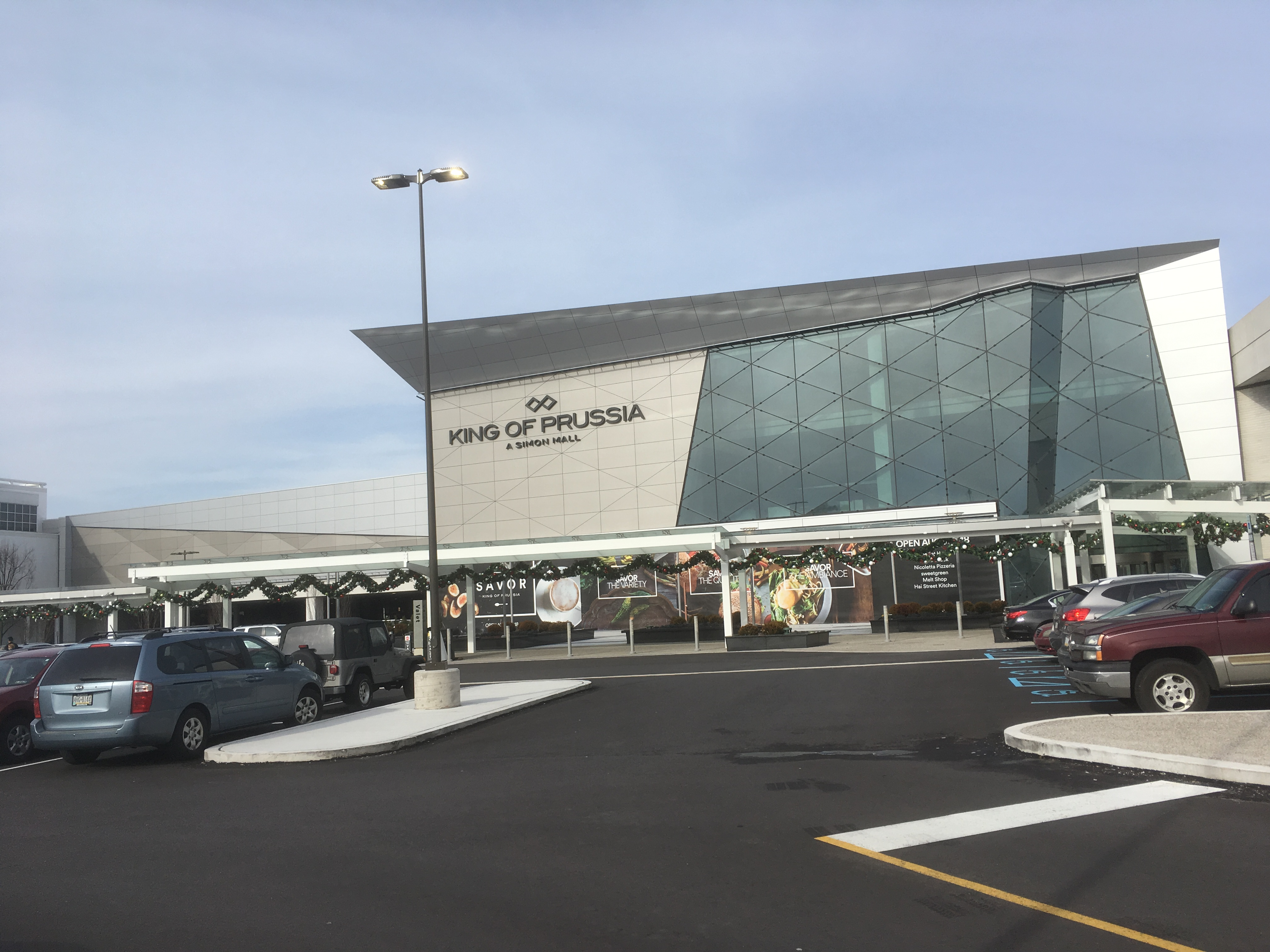
- King of Prussia entrance between Neiman Marcus and Macy's in January 2017
- Location: King of Prussia, Pennsylvania, U.S.
- Coordinates: 40°5′18″N 75°23′25″W
- Address: 160 North Gulph Road
- Opened: August 15, 1963; 63 years ago
- Developer: The Kravco Company
- Manager: Simon Property Group
- Owner: Simon Property Group
- Num. of stores: 450
- Num. of anchor tenants: 6
- Floor area: 2,793,200 square feet (259,497 m^{2})
- Floors: 3 (Court on levels 1-2, Plaza on levels 2-3, 3 in Bloomingdale's, Macy's, Neiman Marcus, Nordstrom, and former JCPenney)
- Parking: 5 parking lots, 3 parking garages, valet parking with 13,376+ spaces
- Public transit: SEPTA bus: 92, 99, 123, 124, 125, 139 at the King of Prussia Transit Center; The Rambler
- Website: simon.com/mall/king-of-prussia

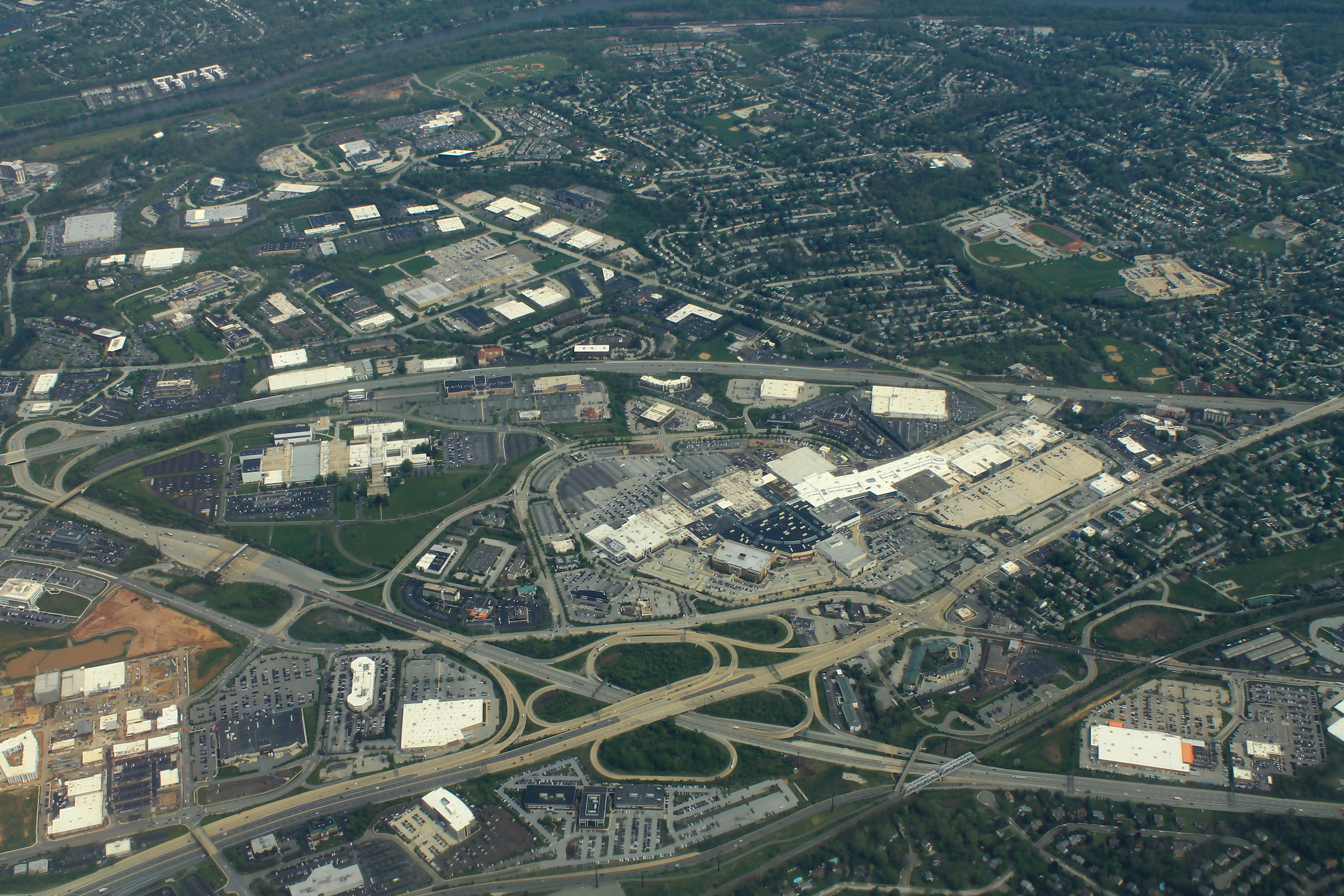
Aerial view of the mall

The King of Prussia Mall, officially known as simply King of Prussia and sometimes shortened to K.O.P., is a shopping mall located in the community of King of Prussia in Upper Merion Township, Pennsylvania. It is the largest shopping mall in Pennsylvania and the fourth-largest shopping mall in the United States in terms of gross leasable area. It is an upscale mall with 450 retailers.

The mall opened in 1963, with a complex that became known as The Plaza at King of Prussia. A second, entirely separate complex, The Court at King of Prussia, opened adjacent to it in 1981. In 2016, a major expansion, now known as The Connector, was completed, connecting the two buildings and creating one large shopping mall.

== Location ==
The King of Prussia Mall is located in the census-designated place of King of Prussia, in Upper Merion Township, Pennsylvania, 20 miles (32 km) northwest of Philadelphia. The mall is near the convergence of four major highways: the Schuylkill Expressway (Interstate 76), the Pennsylvania Turnpike (Interstate 76/Interstate 276), U.S. Route 202, and U.S. Route 422. The mall is located northeast of the Schuylkill Expressway and south of the Pennsylvania Turnpike on the north side of US 202 between Gulph Road to the southwest and Allendale Road to the northeast, with Mall Boulevard providing access to and running through the mall grounds between Gulph Road and US 202. Mall Boulevard passes under a portion of the shopping mall. Ramps to and from the westbound direction of the Schuylkill Expressway connect to Mall Boulevard.

SEPTA Suburban Division bus routes 92, 99, 123, 124, 125, and 139 serve the King of Prussia Mall at the King of Prussia Transit Center along with other stops in the mall complex. These bus routes provide service to the West Chester Transit Center in West Chester, the Norristown Transit Center in Norristown, Phoenixville, the 69th Street Transit Center in Upper Darby, Center City Philadelphia, Chesterbrook, Valley Forge, and Limerick. The Greater Valley Forge Transportation Management Association operates The Rambler, a community shuttle around Upper Merion Township that has two stops at the King of Prussia Mall.

The mall has several outparcels, and several luxury and affordable hotels are nearby. Among the outparcels is the Overlook at King of Prussia shopping center, which consists of a United Artists Theatres, a Going, Going, Gone! warehouse store, a Dave & Busters (upcoming), and an iFLY indoor skydiving center. Lockheed Martin has a campus overlooking the mall area. Also located nearby is the King of Prussia Town Center, a lifestyle center that consists of Wegmans, multiple big-box retailers, and a downtown area with dining, retail, and service establishments and a Town Square. The town center is part of the Village at Valley Forge, a 122-acre mixed-use development under construction that consists of retail, apartments, townhouses, condominiums, office space, and the Children's Hospital of Philadelphia's Specialty Care and Surgery Center.

== Description ==
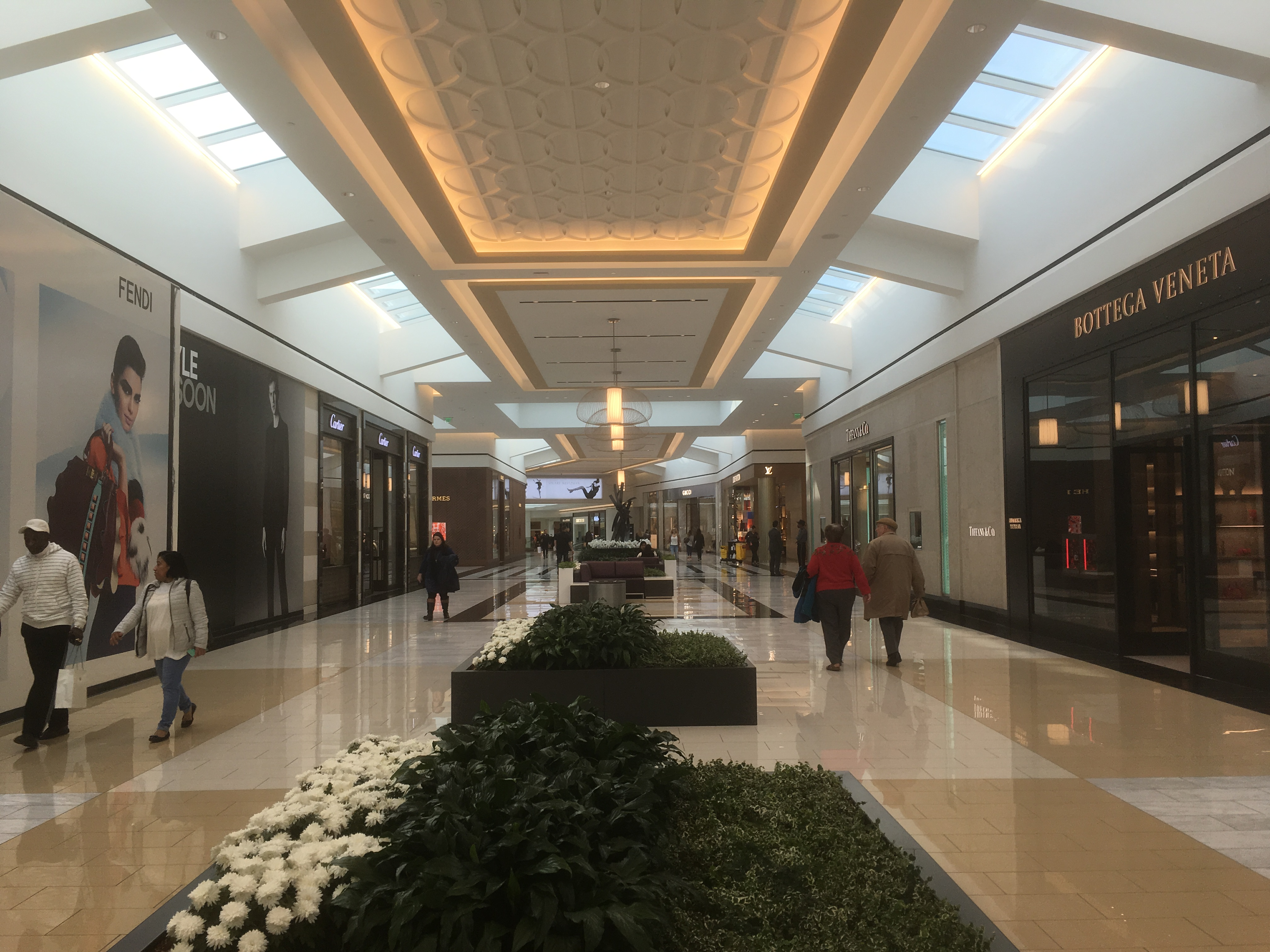
The expansion corridor of King of Prussia Mall, which connects The Court and The Plaza, in February 2017

The King of Prussia Mall is anchored by Nordstrom, Macy's, Neiman Marcus, Bloomingdale's, Dick's Sporting Goods, Eataly, Netflix House, and Primark and contains a diverse merchant mix of over 450 stores, including a collection of luxury retailers. The mall is owned and managed by Simon Property Group of Indianapolis. A selection of international dining options are available at two food courts and in multiple casual and fine dining establishments.

The mall is a prominent tourist destination in the Philadelphia area, with an estimated 20% of visitors as tourists. The King of Prussia Mall attracts 22 million visitors annually. Several nearby hotels offer mall tourist packages, which typically include mall gift cards. Due to the mall's size, several retailers rent more than one space.

A covered outdoor walkway connects Macy's and Neiman Marcus and was the main connection between the two malls prior to the expansion completed in 2016. The eastern portion of the mall (originally known as the Court) has two anchor stores, Macy's and Bloomingdale's. It originally had a third anchor, Abraham & Straus, which sold its store in 1988 to Strawbridge & Clothier, which subsequently relocated to the former Wanamaker's location at The Plaza in 1996 upon its acquisition by May Department Stores. Its spot was redeveloped as the Pavilion at King of Prussia. Stores in this section include a double-level Urban Outfitters, Old Navy, and The Cheesecake Factory.

In 2018, King of Prussia was valued at $2.77 billion and had sales per square foot of $773, making it the 8th most valuable mall in the United States.

== History ==
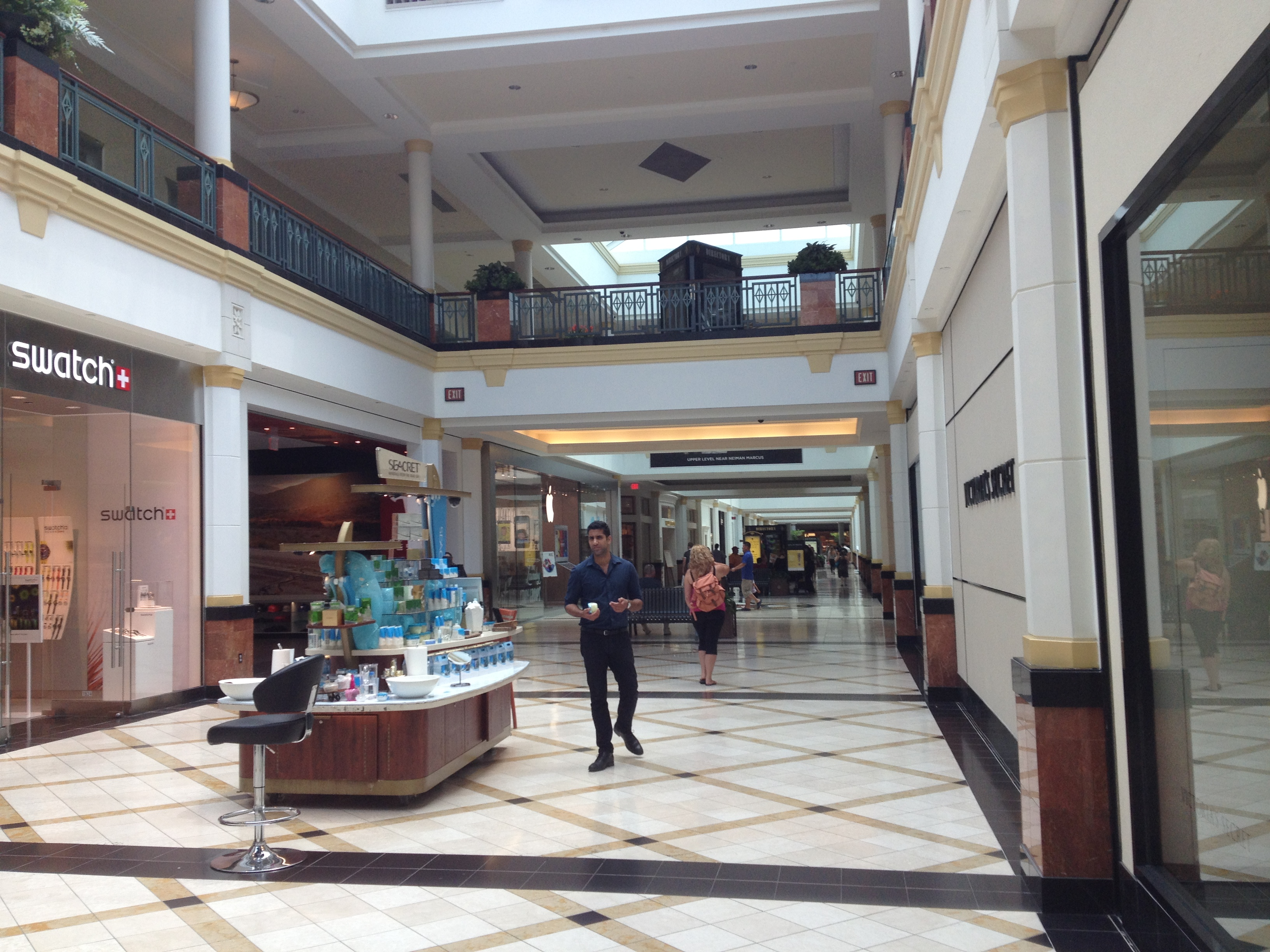
The Plaza in July 2013, prior to its 2018 renovations

=== 1960s ===
The first portion of what was then named King of Prussia Plaza opened on September 18, 1962, as a modest open-air shopping mall. It consisted of an "A-Frame"-style Acme supermarket and a 172,000 sq ft, 2-story E. J. Korvette discount department store. The mall carried an American Colonial theme, due to its proximity to the Revolutionary War encampment at Valley Forge State Park.

The mall expanded rapidly over the next few years. On August 15, 1963, a 152,000 sq ft, 3-story JCPenney anchor store was opened, along with 14 adjacent inline stores. A grand opening that day was attended by Morris A. Kravitz, developer of the mall and W.M. Batten, president of the J.C. Penney company. Batten cut a ribbon opening the store, while the managers of the other 14 new stores cut ribbons surrounding it. 6 more inline stores opened a week later, on August 22, followed by five more in September and five more in October. Among the inline stores was a 46,000 sq ft Woolworth's.

The 1400-seat Stanley Warner Plaza Theatre cinema opened on May 19, 1965, showing the Charlton Heston epic Major Dundee as its first feature. A John Wanamaker anchor store opened on August 16, 1965, in a striking 194,000 sq ft, 3-level octagonal structure. Gimbels opened a 229,000 sq ft, 3-level anchor store on May 2, 1966.

=== 1970s ===
By the 1970s, the mall was the largest shopping center in the east, with over 1 million sq ft, over 100 stores and parking for 27,000 cars. It consisted of a small, fully enclosed section (connecting the three department stores) and a sprawling outdoor mall.

=== 1980s ===
On August 6, 1981, Kravco, the mall's parent company, opened a second sister mall, The Court at King of Prussia, directly across the street. The combined size of the two malls was 2.4 million sq ft. The Court was fully enclosed, anchored by Bamberger's (which had opened before the new mall, on March 12, 1981), Bloomingdale's, and Abraham & Straus (A&S).

Korvettes closed on December 24, 1980. It was demolished and replaced by a food court and a 212,000 sq ft 2-story Sears "store of the future" anchor, which opened on July 25, 1983. Sears had moved from the Logan Square shopping center in nearby Norristown.

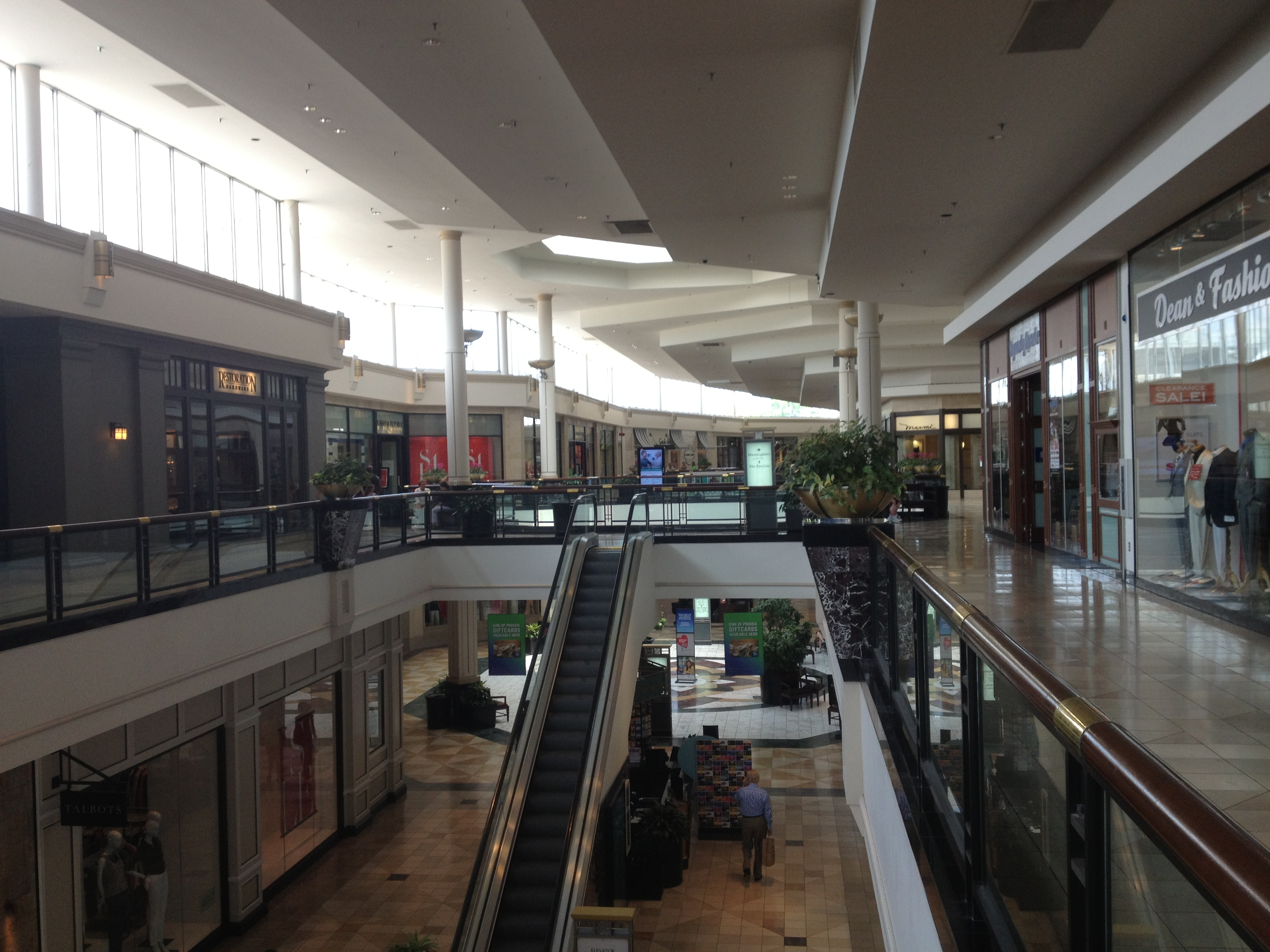
King of Prussia Mall near Bloomingdale's in 2013

In the 1980s, The Plaza featured Herman's World of Sporting Goods, and a Lionel "Kiddie City" toy store. The Plaza also featured two 1980s style video arcades, each named Spaceport, and the RKO Stanley Warner (later Sam Eric, and then United Artists Plaza) movie theater which, in an era before multiplexes, had only one extra large 70 m screen.

Gimbel's closed in June 1986 and was replaced with Stern's. Bamberger's was renamed Macy's on October 7 of that year. Abraham & Straus closed in 1987 and was replaced with Strawbridge & Clothier in 1988.

=== 1990s ===
Stern's was replaced with JCPenney in 1992, moving from their original building in the middle of the Plaza, which was turned into mall space. Alongside this, the anchor space was converted to a 2-level shopping space, with its original third level being closed to the public and converted to office and storage space.

Further expansion took place in the early 1990s. During this process, the oldest portions of The Plaza were demolished and replaced and the two malls, The Court and The Plaza, were connected by a pedestrian bridge and walkway. Marketing from then on presented them as a united entity. The new Plaza was fully enclosed and had two levels throughout. The rebuilt Plaza celebrated its grand opening on November 2, 1995. Three new anchor stores were added. Lord & Taylor opened in the fall of 1995, while Neiman Marcus opened on February 24, 1996 and Nordstrom opened that spring.

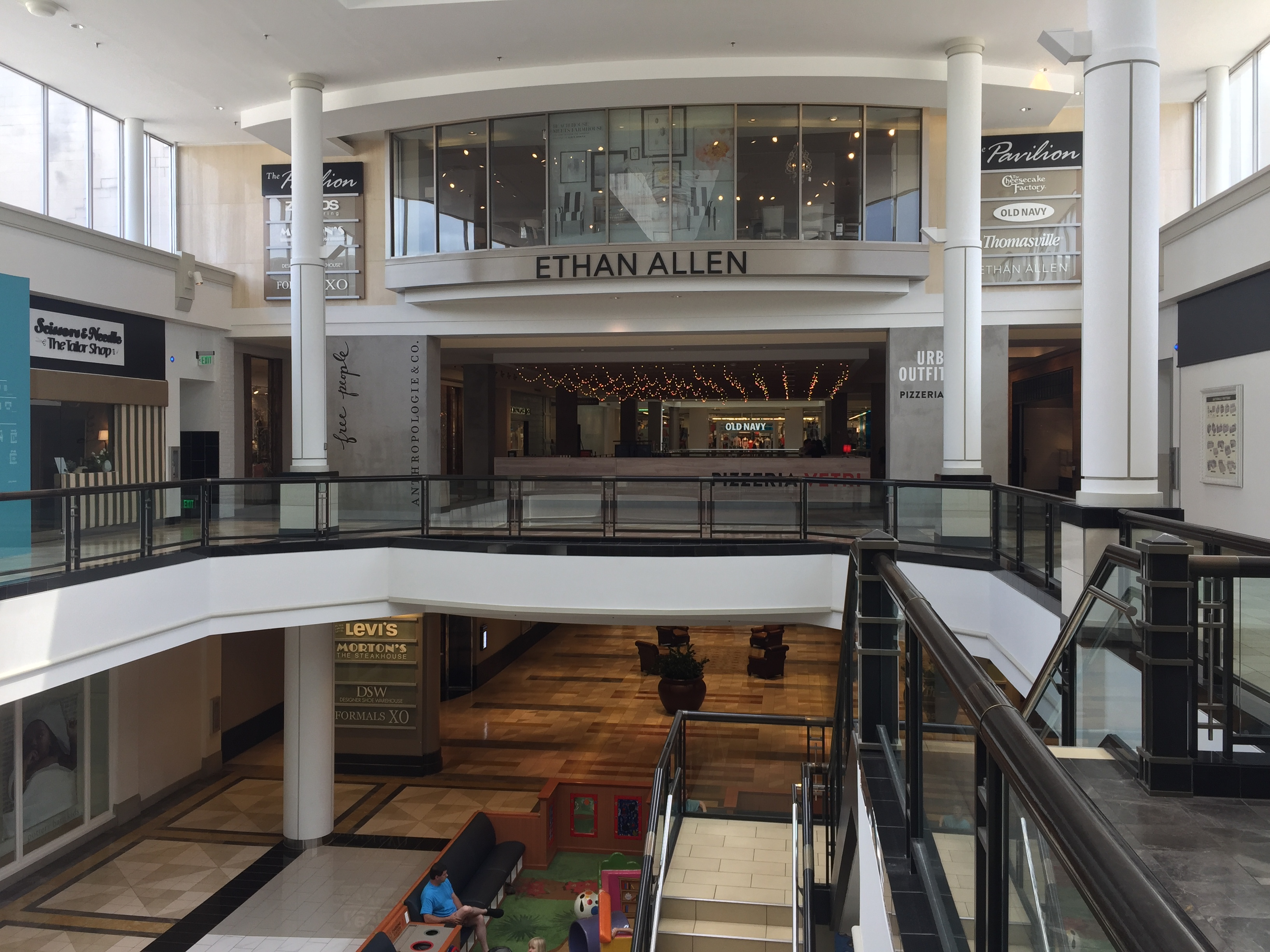
The Pavilion and the mall's Ethan Allen store in July 2017

In June 1995, Wanamaker's went bankrupt. After early reports that they might be sold to Boscov's, the chain was instead sold to May Department Stores, which rebranded all Wanamaker's as Hecht's, their Baltimore-Washington regional nameplate. The Plaza's John Wanamaker store was renamed Hecht's on September 3, 1995.

In April 1996, Strawbridge & Clothier was sold to May Department Stores as well. They renamed the store Strawbridge's and rebranded their Hecht's at The Plaza, after only a year, as Strawbridge's, in addition to the existing Strawbridge's at The Court. Woolworth's closed in 1997. The Strawbridge's at The Court closed in January 1999.

=== 2000s ===
In 2001, the former Abraham & Straus/Strawbridge's building at The Court was converted into a mall expansion named "The Pavilion."

In 2006, May Department Stores dissolved Strawbridge's and their remaining anchor store at The Plaza (the former Wanamaker's) became a second Macy's anchor store, before closing the following year.

The mall served as the home of the Philadelphia Freedoms tennis team of World TeamTennis in 2008 and 2009. Whenever a tennis event was to occur, a temporary tennis stadium that seated 3,000 was constructed in the parking lot of the Bloomingdale's anchor store. The Freedoms left for The Pavilion at Villanova University in 2010.

=== 2010s ===
Lendlease had held a 50 percent partnership interest in the mall since 1996, when it purchased it from NLI Properties Inc.; Kravco, Simon, and three family trusts held the remaining 50 percent through the Kingmak Associates partnership.

In May 2011, Lend Lease agreed to sell its stake to Morgan Stanley's Prime Property Fund, but Kingmak exercised a contractual right of first refusal on the sale. Through a series of transactions completed in August 2011, Simon, already a minority partner on Kingmak's side of the ownership, increased its overall stake in the mall from 12.4 percent to 96 percent.

The Macy's building at the Plaza and adjacent parking garage were demolished in fall 2011, to make way for over 100,000 square feet (9,300 m^{2}) of retail space and additional parking.

On November 29, 2011, Simon Property Group announced plans to create an additional 140,000-square-foot (13,000 m^{2}) expansion/connector to connect The Court and The Plaza. This new retail connector features 50 stores, restaurants with an upscale dining pavilion, and a customer lounge. Upon completion, this project made the King of Prussia Mall the largest official shopping mall in the United States (larger than Mall of America in overall square footage, though not in quantity of shops), and placed the mall under one roof for the first time in its existence. The 155,000-square-foot (14,400 m^{2}) expansion also includes a new parking garage "with speed ramps, space location technology and valet service." Construction on this expansion was estimated to cost $150 million. Several outparcels were also proposed for this expansion.

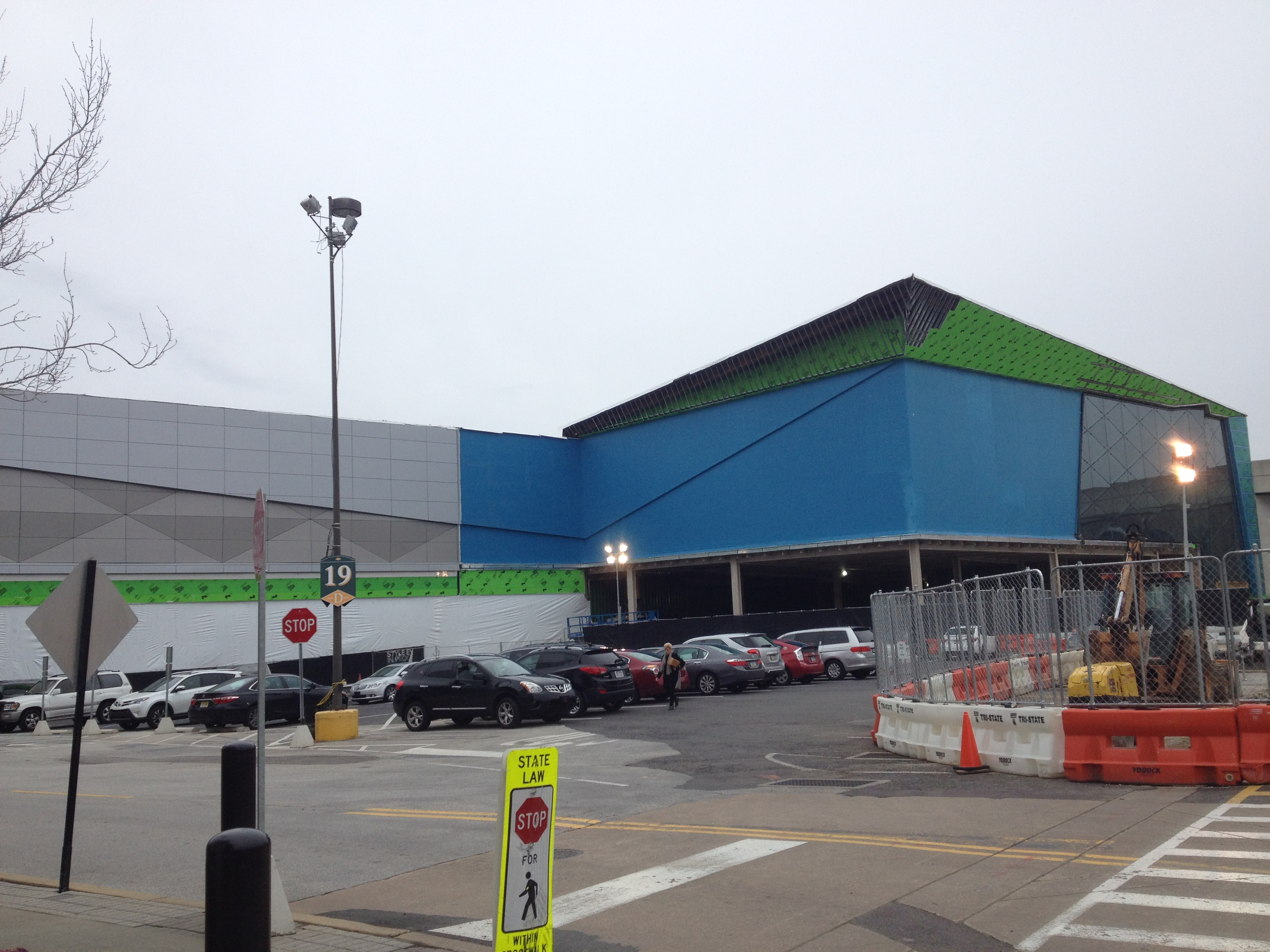
The expansion connecting The Court and The Plaza under construction in January 2016

On November 18, 2014, construction began on the expansion to connect The Court and The Plaza. The Connector opened August 18, 2016, with two ribbons joined from The Court and The Plaza. Simon Property Group COO Rick Sokolov and U.S. Representative Brendan Boyle were present for the ribbon tying ceremony.

In January 2014, Sears announced that it would sublease some of its space to Dick's Sporting Goods. Sears closed this location entirely in early December 2014. It was announced that Irish retailer Primark would be on the first level of its space while Dick's Sporting Goods would take parts of the second level. The Primark store opened on November 25, 2015. In 2015, Sears Holdings spun off 235 properties, including the Sears at King of Prussia, into Seritage Growth Properties. Portions of the former Sears Auto Center are now Nan Xiang Soup Dumplings and Yard House. On March 17, 2017, JCPenney announced that its store would be closing as part of a plan to close 138 stores nationwide; the store closed on July 31, 2017.

The western section of the mall (also known as The Plaza) went under renovation in April 2018, which added new flooring and handrails, LED lighting, and additional soft seating areas and restrooms. The renovation was completed in May 2019.

On October 5, 2019, Happy Place opened on the second floor of the former JCPenney building. It left on February 29, 2020, as part of a national tour.

=== 2020s ===
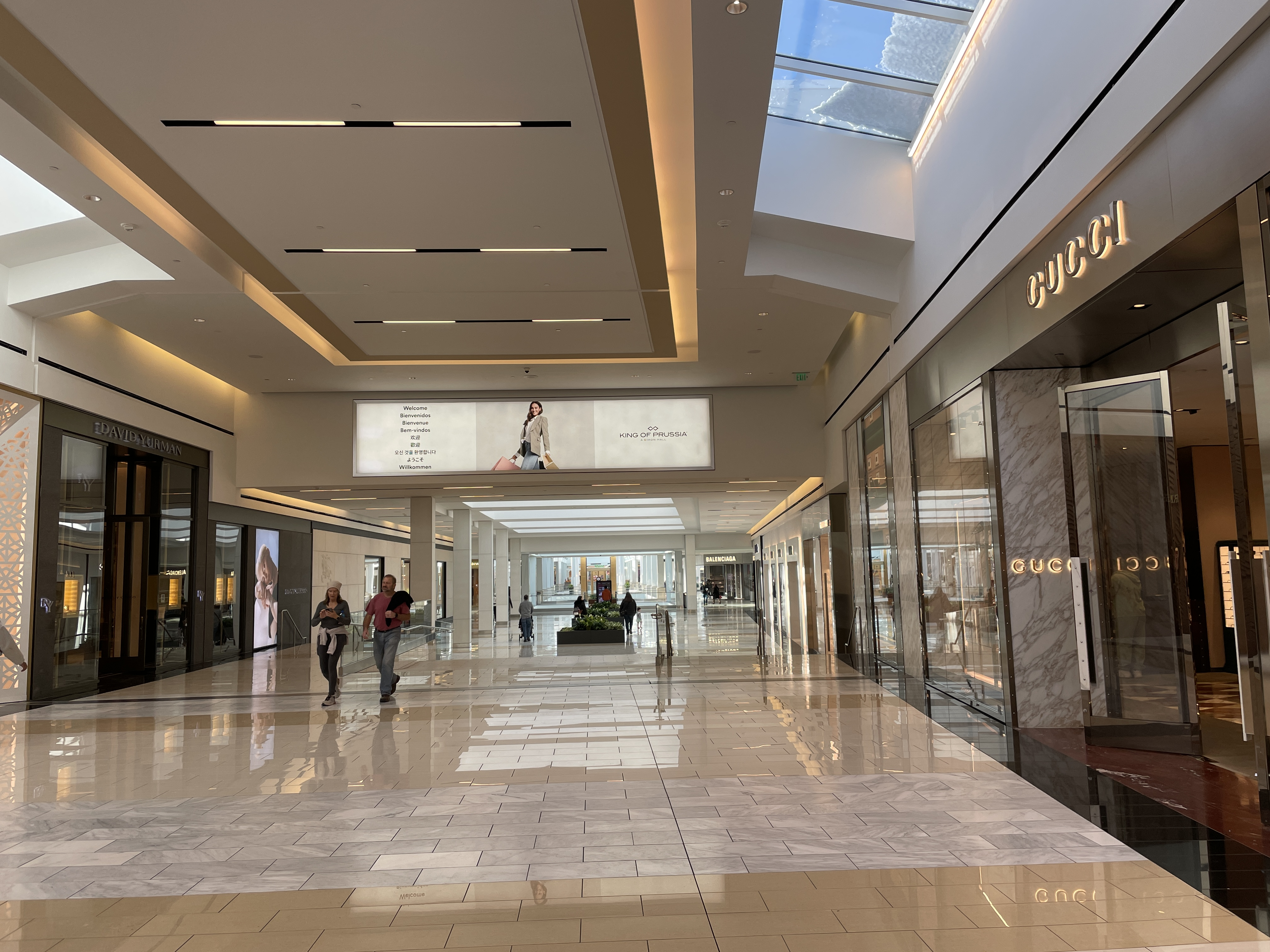
King of Prussia Mall near Neiman Marcus

On May 3, 2021, during the COVID-19 pandemic, Montgomery County opened a COVID-19 vaccination site in the former JCPenney space, which has since shut down.

In June 2022, it was announced that Wayfair, an online retailer of furniture and home goods, would open a brick-and-mortar store in the previous JCPenney outpost. The store was to feature a cafe and a rooftop deck with a bar. The Wayfair store was planned to open in 2023 or 2024 before plans were cancelled.

In 2023, it was announced that Eataly, a chain of Italian food halls, would be opening at the mall in 2025. It opened on October 2, 2025.

In August 2020, Lord & Taylor announced it would close all its stores, as a result of the economic effects of the COVID-19 pandemic. On June 18, 2024, it was announced that Netflix would open a Netflix House venue in the former Lord & Taylor space, featuring set replicas from shows and movies, themed restaurants, a theater, and gift shops. The venue is the first-of-its-kind, alongside one that opened at Galleria Dallas in Dallas on December 11, 2025, and another set to open at the BLVD Las Vegas in Las Vegas in late 2027. Netflix House opened on November 12, 2025.

In March 2025, it was announced that Simon was nearing a deal to bring retail and entertainment venues to the former JCPenney building. On October 23, 2025, Simon announced that Level99, an entertainment venue, would open in 2027 using a portion of the former JCPenney. On November 3, 2025, it was announced that Dick's House of Sport, an experiential retail concept by Dick's Sporting Goods, would open in 2027 using an additional portion of the former JCPenney.

== See also ==
- List of largest shopping malls in the United States
