= Chesterbrook, Pennsylvania =

Unincorporated community in Pennsylvania, US

Chesterbrook
- Census-designated place
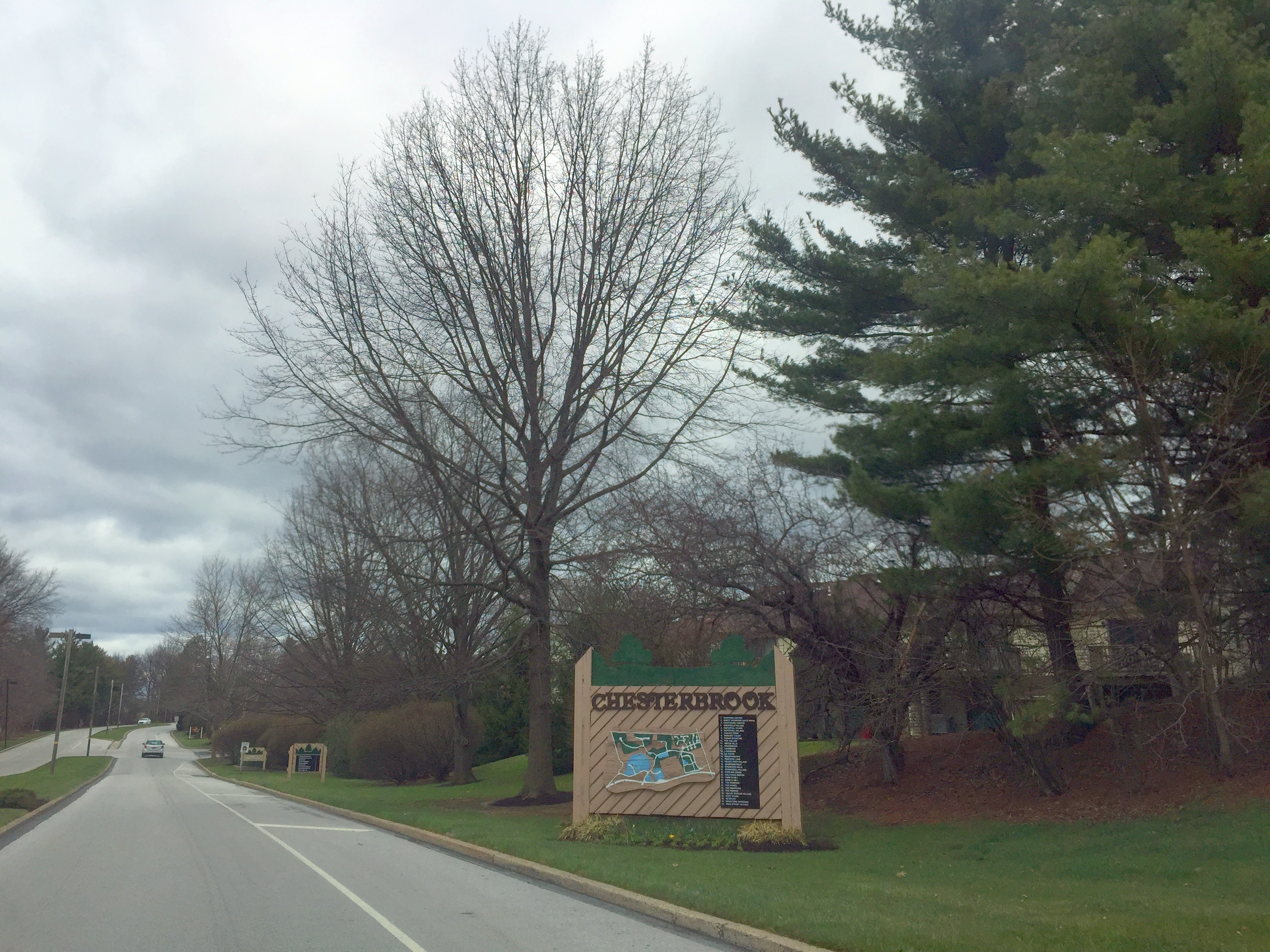
- Chesterbrook entrance

- Location in Chester County and the U.S. state of Pennsylvania.
- Coordinates: 40°04′28″N 75°27′18″W
- Country: United States
- State: Pennsylvania
- County: Chester
- Township: Tredyffrin

Area
  - Total: 1.56 sq mi (4.05 km^{2})
  - Land: 1.56 sq mi (4.03 km^{2})
  - Water: 0.0077 sq mi (0.02 km^{2})
- Elevation: 161 ft (49 m)

Population (2020)
  - Total: 5,610
  - Density: 3,601.5/sq mi (1,390.54/km^{2})
- Time zone: UTC-5 (EST)
  - Summer (DST): UTC-4 (EDT)
- ZIP code: 19087
- Area codes: 610 and 484
- FIPS code: 42-13216

Chesterbrook is a census-designated place (CDP) in Chester County, Pennsylvania, United States. It is located within the Philadelphia metropolitan area and just south of Valley Forge National Historical Park. The population was 4,589 at the 2010 census.

Chesterbrook is a development located in Tredyffrin Township which is located in Chester County. It is not a town, unincorporated or otherwise. It is in the Chester County side of Wayne. Wayne exists primarily in Delaware County, but also has a small portion of Montgomery County, all within the zip code of 19087.

Chesterbrook is a development which started when the Fox Companies purchased land (two large parcels), and, due to the Municipalities Planning Code of 1969 of the Commonwealth of Pennsylvania, the development was approved in 1978.

== Geography ==
According to the U.S. Census Bureau, Chesterbrook has a total area of 1.6 square miles (4.1 km^{2}), all land. Chesterbrook is located approximately 23 miles from Philadelphia.

== Demographics ==
Historical population
Census	Pop.	Note	%±
2000	4,625		—
2010	4,589		−0.8%
2020	5,610		22.2%

At the 2000 census there were 4,625 people, 2,356 households, and 1,175 families living in the CDP. The population density was 2,871.7 inhabitants per square mile (1,108.8/km^{2}). There were 2,413 housing units at an average density of 1,498.3 per square mile (578.5/km^{2}). The racial makeup of the CDP was 89.71% White, 1.84% African American, 0.17% Native American, 7.07% Asian, 0.52% from other races, and 0.69% from two or more races. Hispanic or Latino of any race were 2.03%.

There were 2,356 households, 20.4% had children under the age of 18 living with them, 39.2% were married couples living together, 8.3% had a female householder with no husband present, and 50.1% were non-families. 42.1% of households were made up of individuals, and 7.2% were one person aged 65 or older. The average household size was 1.96 and the average family size was 2.71.

The age distribution was 17.3% under the age of 18, 4.0% from 18 to 24, 38.4% from 25 to 44, 29.3% from 45 to 64, and 10.9% 65 or older. The median age was 40 years. For every 100 females, there were 80.7 males. For every 100 females age 18 and over, there were 79.2 males.

The median household income was $80,792 and the median family income was $90,872. Males had a median income of $68,906 versus $47,348 for females. The per capita income for the CDP was $51,859. About 1.4% of families and 2.1% of the population were below the poverty line, including 2.8% of those under age 18 and none of those age 65 or over.

== Economy ==
- Company AmerisourceBergen had its headquarters in Chesterbrook. It is now at: 1 W 1st Ave, Conshohocken, PA 19428
- The company Ionos has one of its two headquarters in Chesterbrook, Pennsylvania

== Education ==
The CDP is within the Tredyffrin/Easttown School District. Most areas of the CDP are zoned to Valley Forge Elementary School while some are zoned to New Eagle Elementary School. The district has two middle schools, Valley Forge and Tredyffrin/Easttown. All residents are zoned to Valley Forge Middle School and Conestoga High School.

== Infrastructure ==
=== Transportation ===
Chesterbrook Boulevard serves as the main road through Chesterbrook, heading south to an interchange with the U.S. Route 202 freeway and an intersection with Pennsylvania Route 252 at Swedesford Road and heading east to another intersection with PA 252 at Valley Forge Road. Chesterbrook is served by SEPTA Suburban Division bus routes with the Route 124 bus connecting the community to the King of Prussia Transit Center at the King of Prussia Mall and Center City Philadelphia and the Route 205 bus connecting the community during peak weekday hours to the Paoli station along SEPTA Regional Rail's Paoli/Thorndale Line.

The Chester Valley Trail passes south of Chesterbrook. Walking paths connect Chesterbrook to Valley Forge National Historical Park.
