= Transportation Management Association of Chester County =

Public transportation agency in Pennsylvania

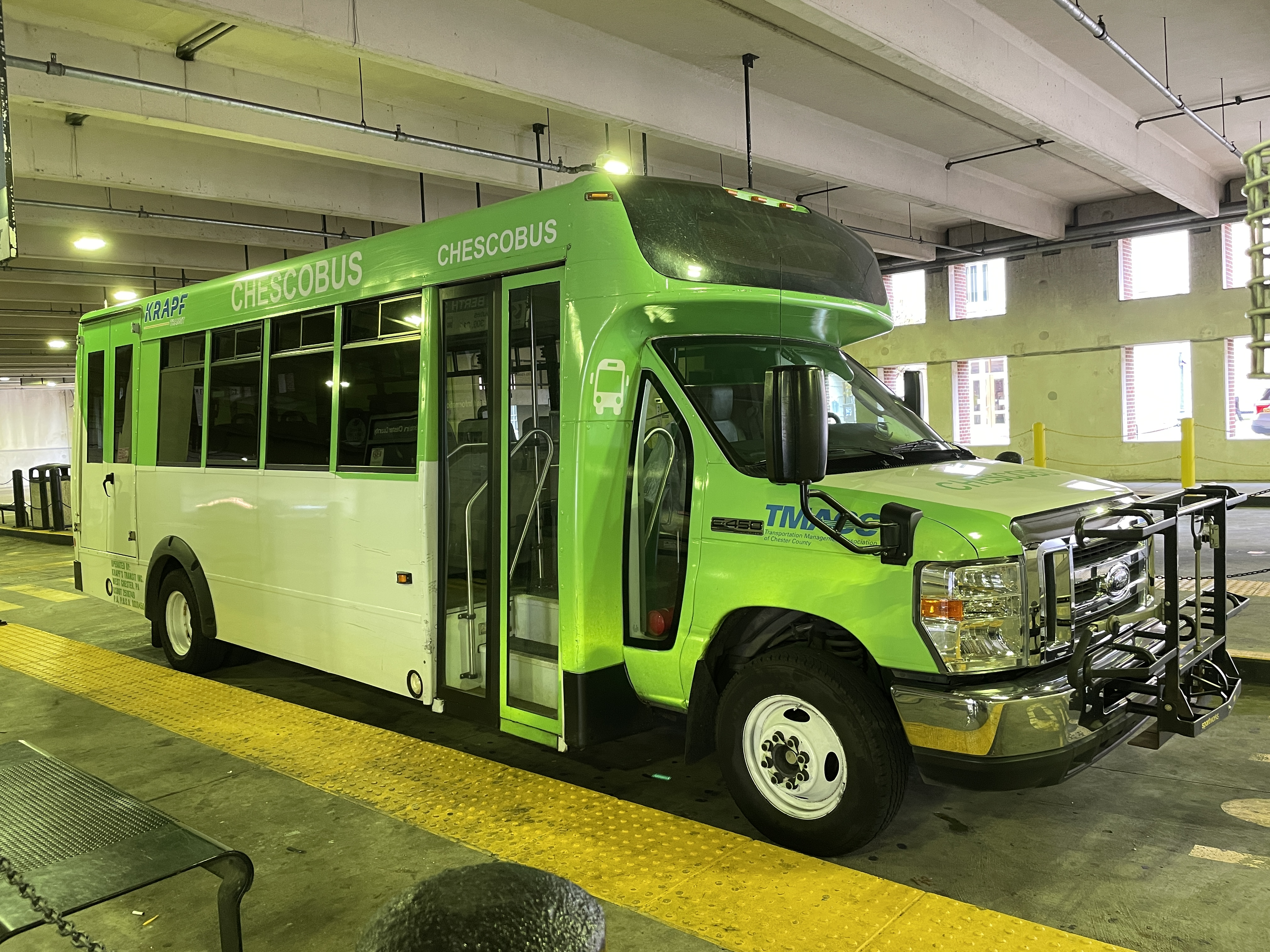
- Krapf Transit bus operating TMACC's SCCOOT route at the West Chester Transportation Center
- Founded: 1992
- Headquarters: Malvern, Pennsylvania
- Service area: Chester County, Pennsylvania
- Service type: public transit / advocacy group
- Fleet: buses
- Fuel type: Diesel, hybrid diesel electric
- Website: www.tmacc.org

Transportation Management Association of Chester County (TMACC), is a public transportation agency designated by the Pennsylvania Department of Transportation to oversee transportation needs of Chester County, Pennsylvania. According to the website, the organization provides services to facilitate car pools, van pools, and bus shuttles. The organization works closely with other organizations such as SEPTA, Krapf Transit and the Delaware Valley Regional Planning Commission.

== Bus service ==
Regular mass transit services under the name "ChescoBus" include:

- SCCOOT - bus service operated by Krapf Transit and managed by TMACC that runs Monday through Friday between West Chester and Oxford.
- Coatesville Link - bus service operated by Krapf Transit and managed by TMACC that runs Monday through Saturday between Coatesville and Parkesburg.
- RideECO - a commuter solution customized for employees of organizations

Former service:

- Krapf "A" - bus service operated and managed by Krapf Transit that ran Monday through Sunday linking Coatesville with West Chester and Exton. The route handled 1,200 daily passengers on an old SEPTA 120 bus route. On August 1, 2021, the route was replaced with SEPTA Route 135.
- Evening Link - bus service operated by Krapf Transit and managed by TMACC that ran on evenings Monday through Saturday between Coatesville and Exton.
- The Outfitter - bus service operated by Krapf Transit and managed by TMACC that ran daily between Coatesville and the Urban Outfitters distribution center in Gap. Discontinued on January 31, 2024.

== History ==
The agency was created in May 1992 as the Chester Valley TMA, with 14 founding members. In June 1995, the name was changed to TMACC to better attract members from across the county. In 2015, TMACC rebranded their buses to be green color and adopted the name "ChescoBus" for their bus routes; TMACC also installed new bus stop signs. This was part of a move to attract riders to the routes, which serve portions of Chester County where mass transit is limited. In 2015, Saturday service was restored to the agency's SCCOOT and Coatesville Link services. Saturday service on SCCOOT was later dropped.
