= King of Prussia Transit Center =

SEPTA bus terminal

King of Prussia TC
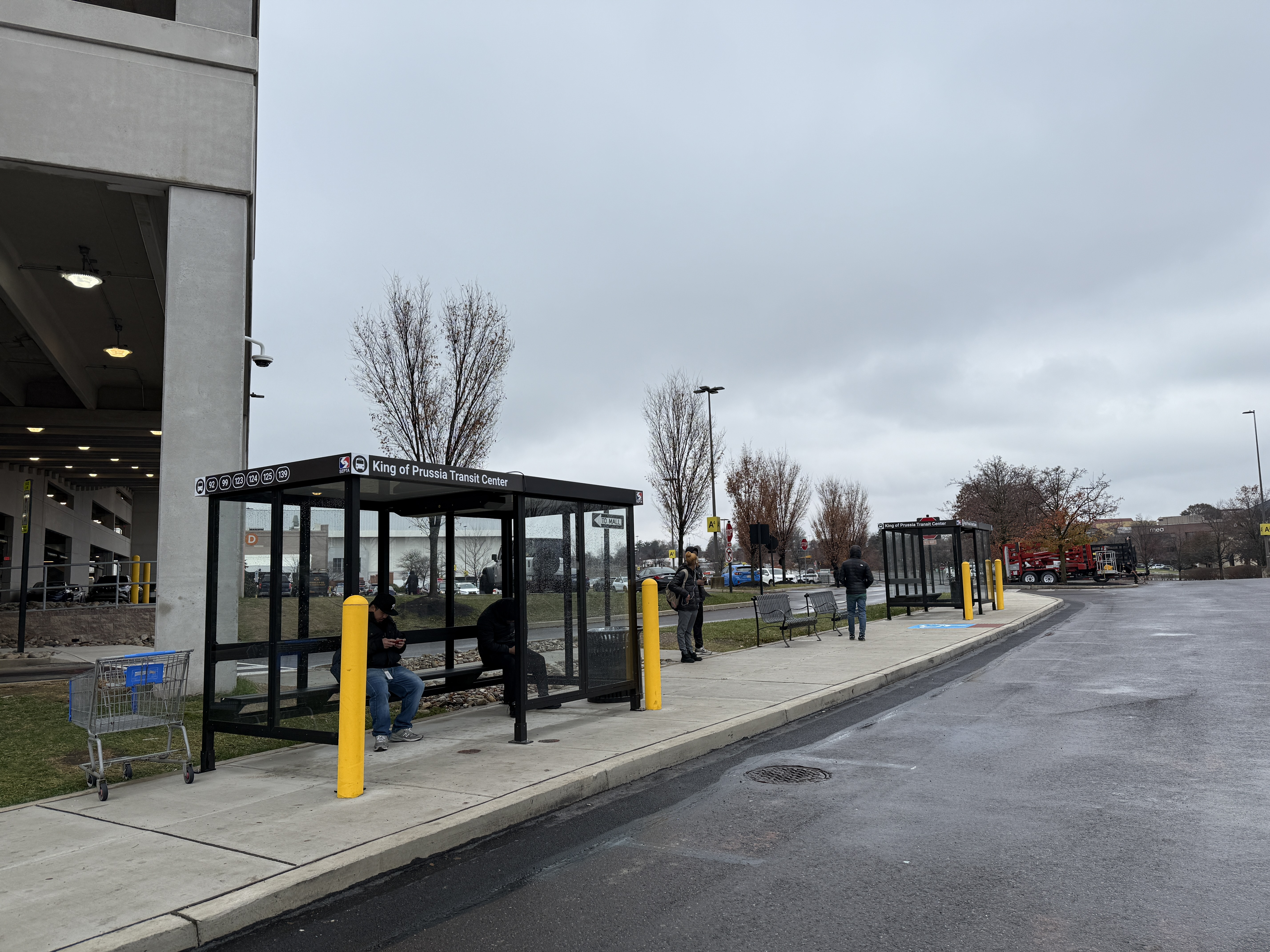
- King of Prussia Transit Center in November 2025

General information
- Location: King of Prussia Mall; King of Prussia, Pennsylvania, 19406
- Coordinates: 40°05′22″N 75°23′34″W
- Bus routes: 6
- Bus operators: SEPTA Suburban Bus: 92, 99, 123, 124, 125, 139

Construction
- Accessible: yes
Location

The King of Prussia Transit Center is a major bus terminal located at the King of Prussia Mall in King of Prussia, Pennsylvania for SEPTA buses. The transit center serves SEPTA Suburban Division buses traveling to Center City Philadelphia via Route 124 or Route 125, Chesterbrook via Route 124, Valley Forge via Route 125, 69th Street Transit Center via Route 123, the Norristown Transit Center and Phoenixville via Route 99, the West Chester Transit Center via Route 92, and Limerick via Route 139.

== Location and layout ==
The King of Prussia Transit Center is located at the King of Prussia Mall next to the Orange parking garage. The transit center consists of two bus shelters and additional benches along a sidewalk. A crosswalk across the parking garage connects to a mall entrance adjacent to Eataly that provides access to the lower level. SEPTA Key fare kiosks are located in the parking garage near the mall entrance.

On October 26, 2025, the transit center moved from its former spot adjacent to the former JCPenney to its current spot adjacent to the Orange parking garage. SEPTA and mall owner Simon Property Group agreed to move the transit center in order to allow for redevelopment at the former JCPenney. The new transit center was built by Simon Property Group at no charge to SEPTA.

== Services ==
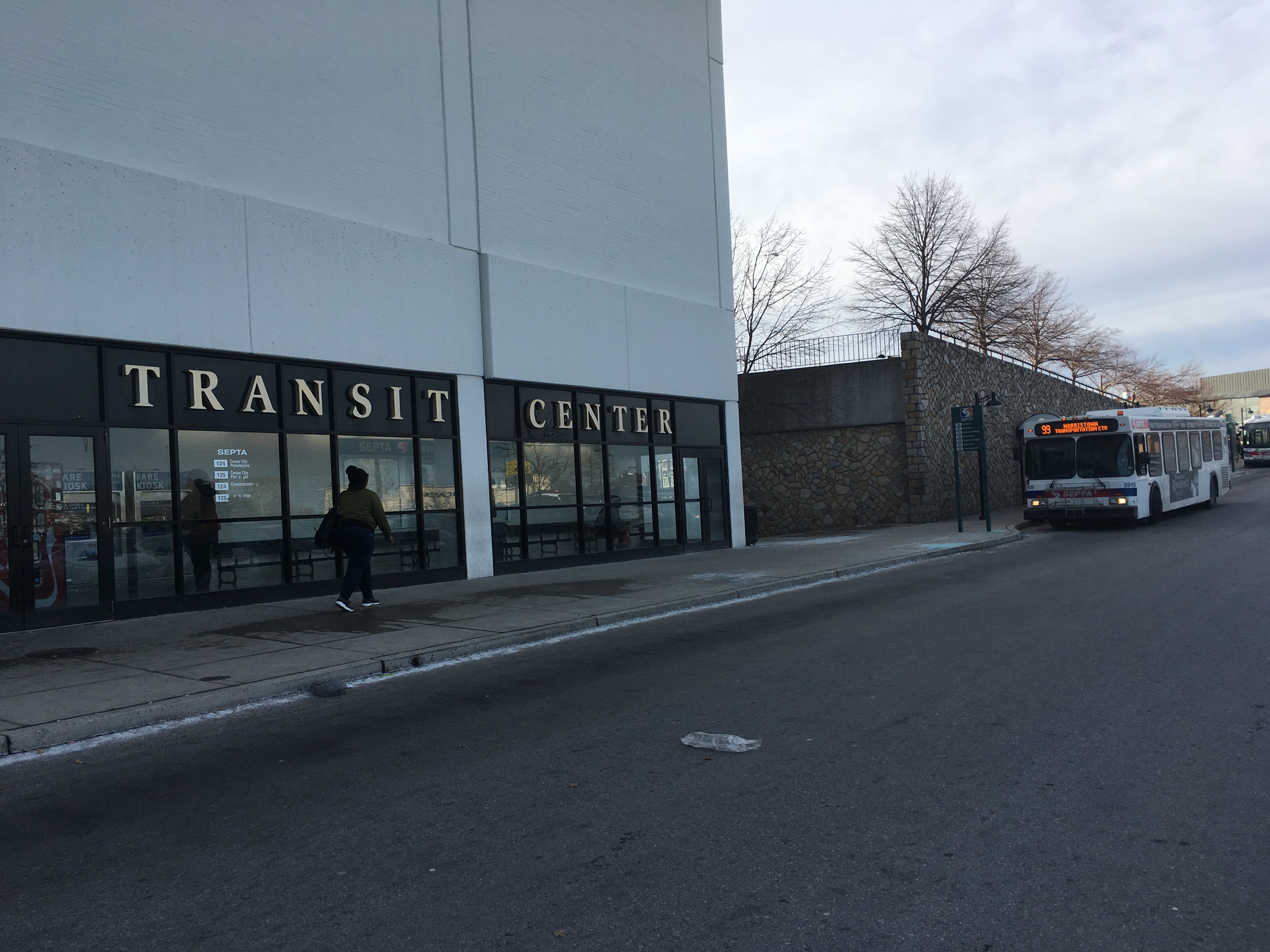
King of Prussia Transit Center in January 2018 in its former location adjacent to the former JCPenney

The King of Prussia Transit Center is served by six SEPTA Suburban Division bus routes. The Route 92 bus provides service Monday to Saturday from the transit center to the West Chester Transit Center in West Chester. The Route 99 bus provides daily service to the Norristown Transit Center in Norristown and to Phoenixville. A few Route 99 trips only run between the Norristown Transit Center and the King of Prussia Transit center.

The Route 123 bus runs daily from the transit center to the 69th Street Transit Center in Upper Darby, providing express service. The Route 124 bus provides daily service to Center City Philadelphia and to Chesterbrook, with express service between Center City Philadelphia and Gulph Mills. Some Route 124 trips only run between Center City Philadelphia and the transit center. The Route 125 bus runs daily to Center City Philadelphia and to Valley Forge, running express between Center City Philadelphia and Gulph Mills. Some Route 125 trips only run between Center City Philadelphia and the transit center. The Route 139 bus provides service Monday to Saturday from the transit center to Limerick.
