= Krapf Group =

Bus operator in the Mid-Atlantic region

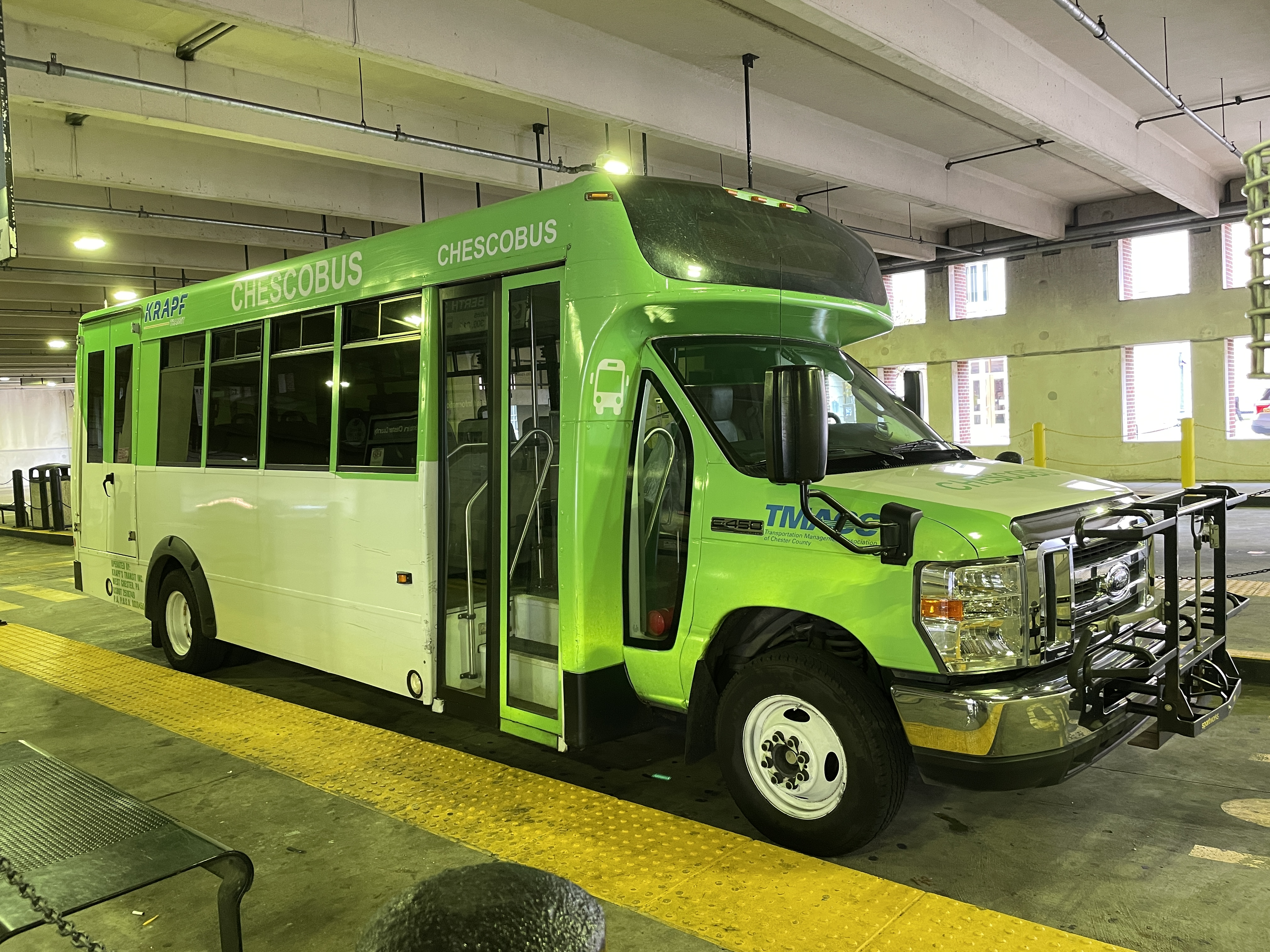
- Krapf Transit bus operating TMACC's SCCOOT route at the West Chester Transportation Center
- Founded: 1942
- Headquarters: West Chester, Pennsylvania
- Service area: Mid-Atlantic states
- Service type: bus operator
- Fleet: buses
- Fuel type: Diesel, hybrid diesel electric
- Chief executive: Blake Krapf (President & CEO)
- Website: http://www.krapfbus.com

The Krapf Group is a bus operator serving the Mid-Atlantic states in the United States. The business is multifaceted to include school buses, public transportation, and charter bus services. Krapf School Bus operates school bus service in Pennsylvania, Delaware, New Jersey, and New York. Krapf Transportation operates public transportation and charter bus services. Krapf Transit currently operates public transportation routes in the Philadelphia metropolitan area for SEPTA, TMACC, and Philadelphia PHLASH.

Krapf Coaches operates charter motorcoaches from the Mid-Atlantic states to points throughout the continental United States and Canada, along with providing charter bus services for colleges and universities. In 2016, Krapf purchased two 2016 MCIJ 4500 buses.

== History ==
Krapf Bus Company was founded in 1942 by George H. Krapf, who purchased two buses to transport students in Downingtown and Honey Brook.

In 2017, Krapf purchased Birnie Bus Service, which operated similar services in New York state.

== Bus service ==
Currently, Krapf Transit operates the following routes:

- SEPTA
  - CCT Connect paratransit service in Chester County
- TMACC
  - Coatesville Link - between Coatesville and Parkesburg.
  - SCCOOT - between Oxford and West Chester.
- Navy Yard Express - between Center City, Philadelphia and the Naval Yard.
- Casino Line - services to Atlantic City, New Jersey
- Philly PHLASH Downtown Loop

Former service:

- Krapf Route "A" (formerly SEPTA Route 120) - linked Coatesville with West Chester and Exton. On August 1, 2021, the route was replaced with SEPTA Route 135.
- Rover Community Transportation - an on demand bus service for senior citizens. In 2012, the service provided 30,400 rides for 157 registered riders The service is only available to seniors 65 years of age or older. The buses operate under the "Aging Shared Rider Program" in Chester County. In 2023, Rover was replaced by Chesco Connect, which is operated by Chester County through the Department of Community Transit.
- SEPTA Route 204. Operations taken over by SEPTA in 2025.
- TMACC Evening Link - Evening service between Parkesburg and Exton.
- TMACC The Outfitter - between Coatesville and the Urban Outfitters distribution center in Gap. Discontinued on January 31, 2024.
- Amtrak Thruway bus service between 30th Street Station in Philadelphia and the BARTA Transportation Center in Reading, with an intermediate stop in Pottstown. Discontinued on March 18, 2025.

Currently, Birnie Bus Service operates the following routes:

- Lewis County Public Transportation
- Madison Transit System
- Oneida County Rural Transit System
- Otsego Express
- Central New York line runs

== Gallery ==
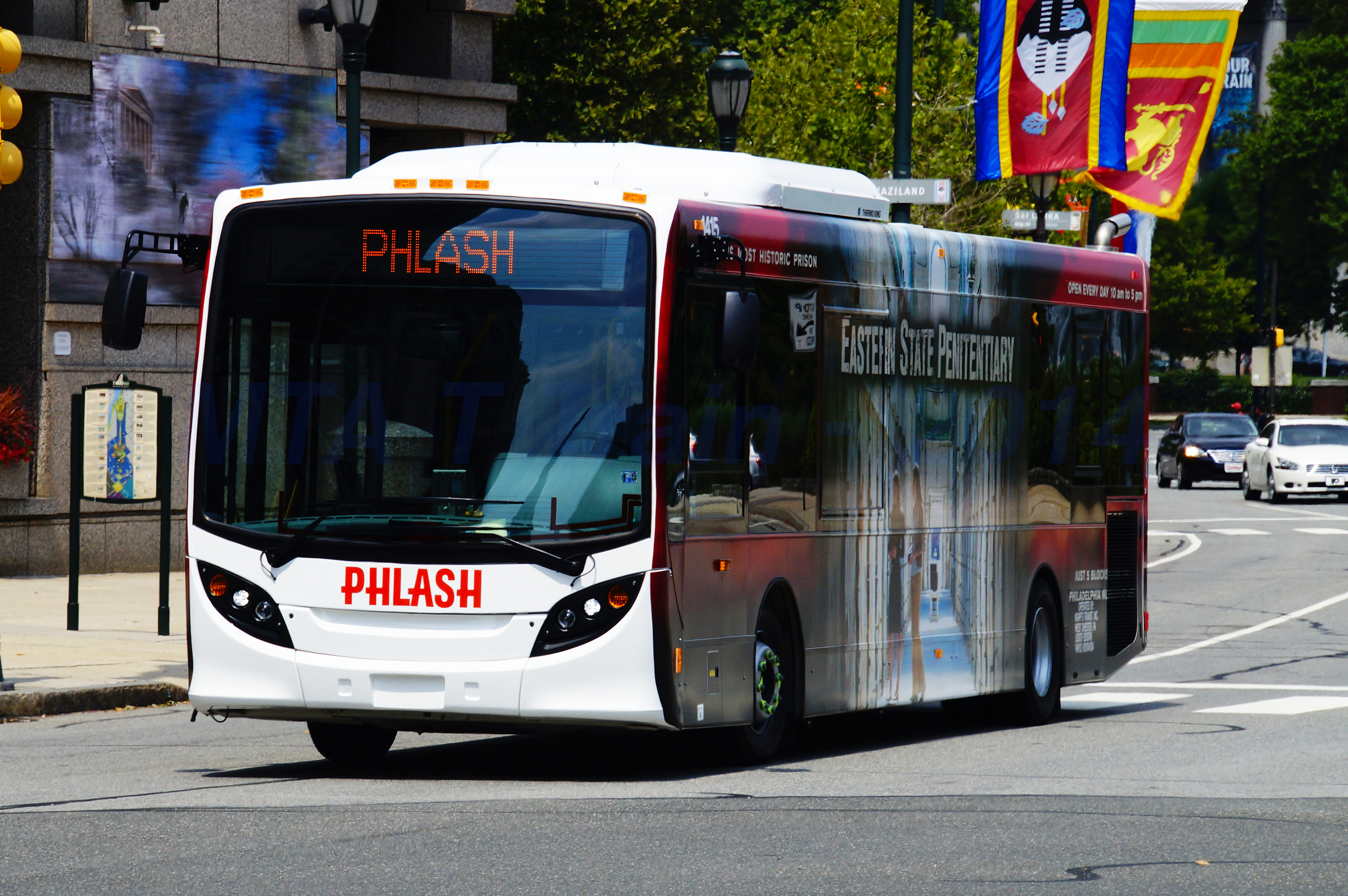
Philly PHLASH bus

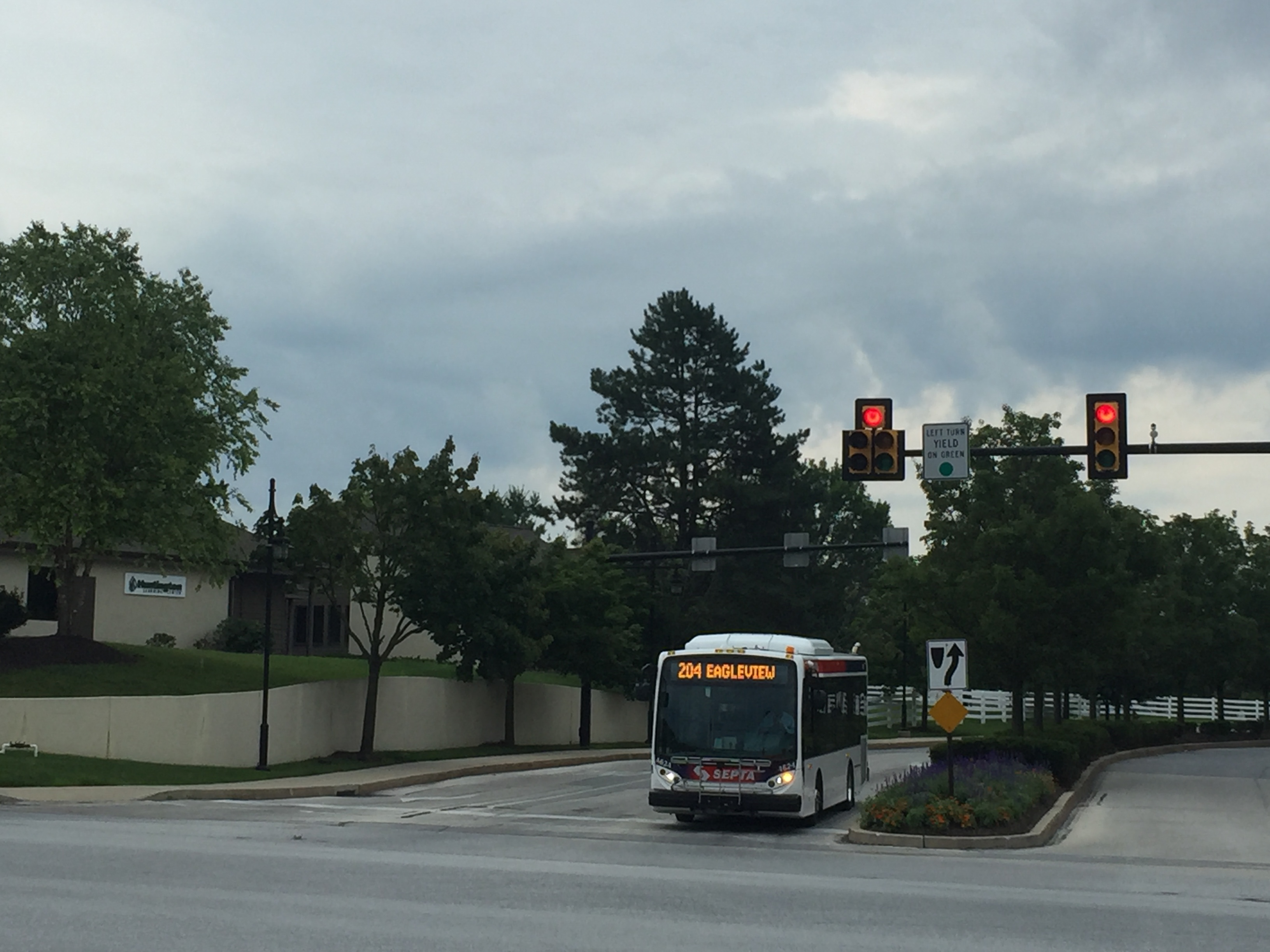
SEPTA 204 bus operated by Krapf Transit

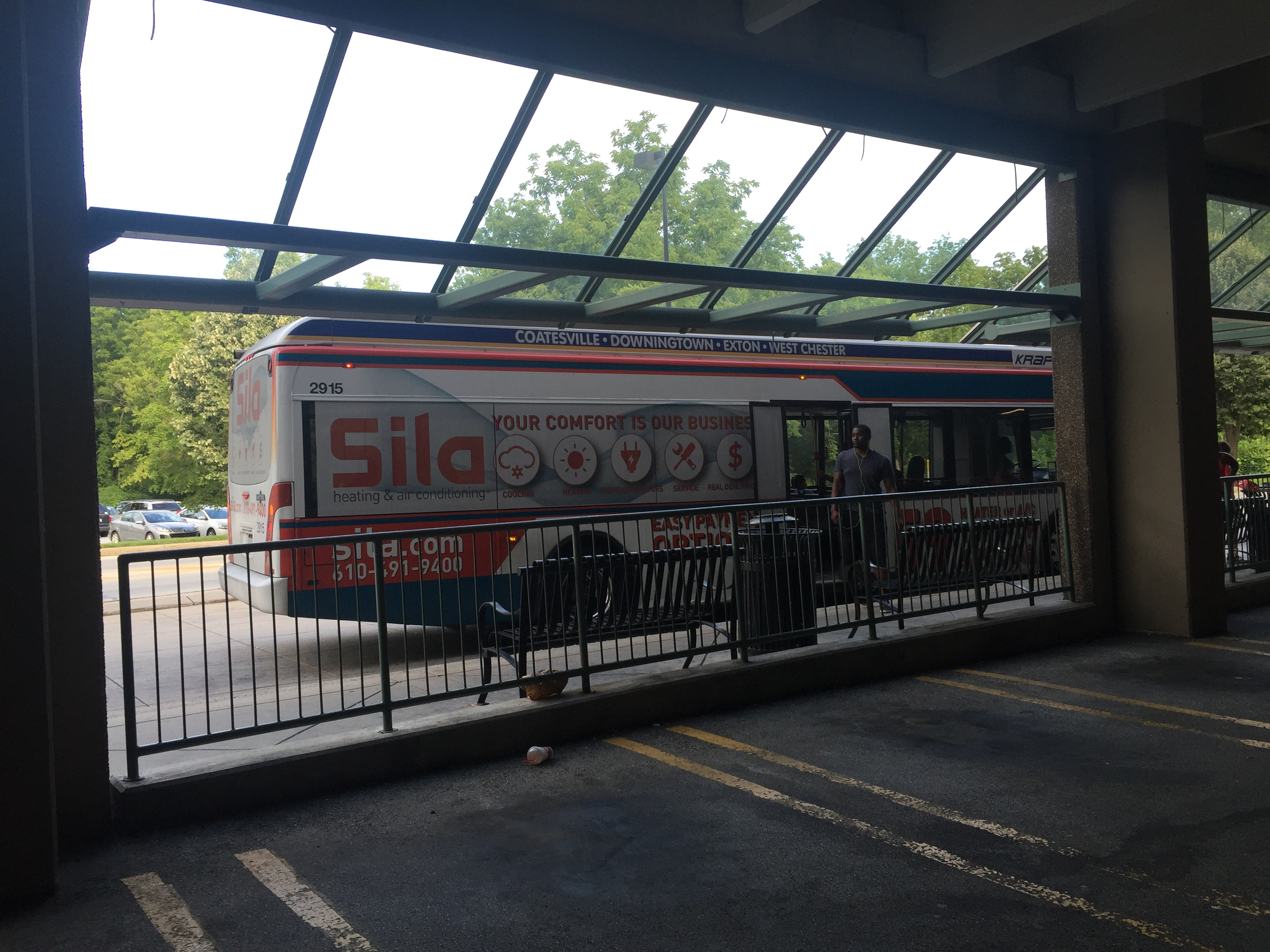
Krapf's "A" bus at the Exton Transportation Center
