= SEPTA Suburban Division bus routes =

SEPTA Suburban Division

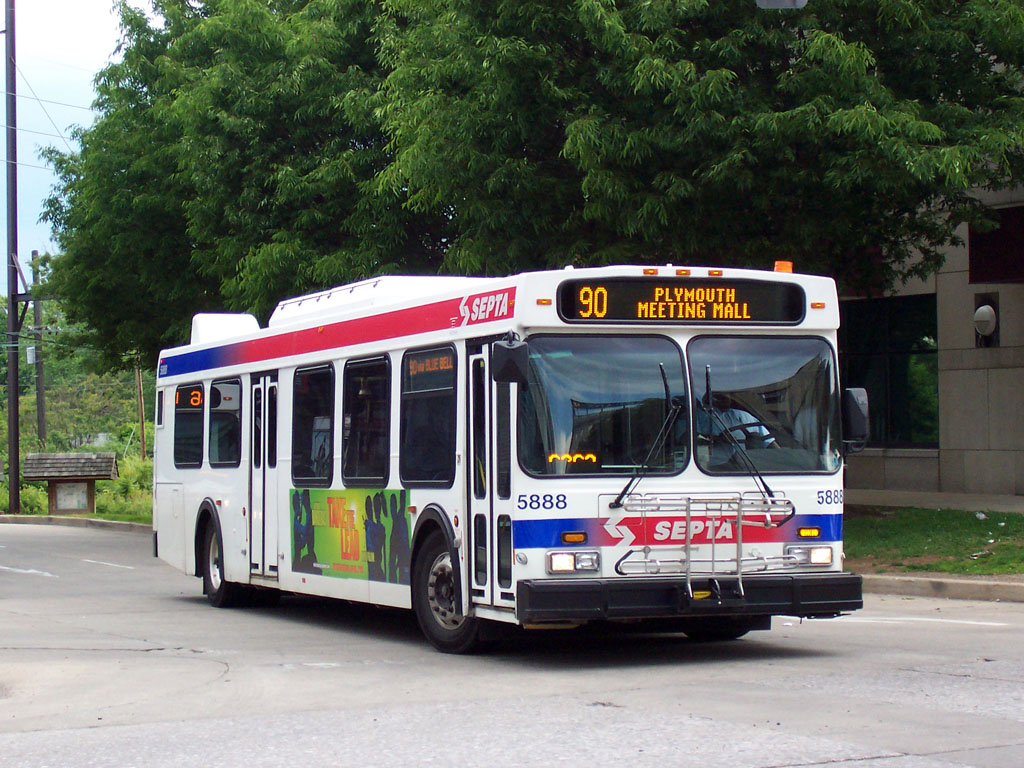
- SEPTA New Flyer D40LF #5888 in Norristown, heading to Plymouth Meeting
- Parent: SEPTA
- Founded: 1968
- Headquarters: 1234 Market Street; Philadelphia, PA 19107
- Locale: Suburban Philadelphia
- Service area: Suburban Philadelphia
- Service type: Local bus service
- Routes: 48
- Fleet: 250
- Operator: See main article
- Chief executive: Scott A. Sauer (general manager)
- Website: septa.org

The Southeastern Pennsylvania Transportation Authority operates or contracts operations of these routes serving points in Bucks, Chester, Delaware, and Montgomery counties, with a few routes operating into the city of Philadelphia. The Suburban Transit Division is broken down into three districts: Victory (Formerly: Red Arrow Division), Frontier, and Contract Operations.

== Routes ==
=== Victory District ===
These routes are operated from the Victory District, located at the 69th Street Transportation Center in Upper Darby Township, Delaware County. This also includes Norristown High Speed Line (Route 100 before 2009; now SEPTA Metro M1), Media–Sharon Hill Line (Routes 101 and 102 before 2025; now SEPTA Metro D1 & D2 rail operations. These routes were once operated by the Philadelphia Suburban Transportation Company, better known by its nickname "Red Arrow Lines". Routes in the Chester area of Delaware County as well as Chester Pike operations were once operated by Southern Penn Bus Lines, which the Red Arrow took control of on June 30, 1960. Today, Routes 114, 117, and 118 are leftovers of the old Southern Penn system. The Philadelphia Transportation Company's "PTC" Folsom Division bus routes (former Routes 71, 76, and 77 trolley lines as well as bus Route 82) were taken over by Red Arrow Lines on January 20, 1961. Since that time the Ex-PTC routes have been eliminated or consolidated into the current route system. SEPTA took over Red Arrow Lines on January 29, 1970. This was one of the last privately owned transit operations left in the United States. Even today some longtime residents, transit historians, and the local news media still refer to this operation as SEPTA's Red Arrow Division. In 2011, SEPTA renamed 69th Street Terminal the 69th Street Transportation Center and in 2025, it was renamed again to 69th Street Transit Center as part of a system wide simplification scheme for major route termini.

Route	Terminals		Major streets	History	Notes	Daily Ridership (FY 2019)
103	69th Street Transit Center	Ardmore Suburban Square	Brookline Boulevard, Darby Road, SEPTA Private Busway	Formerly known as Red Arrow Routes "C" and "R". Trolley service to Ardmore started May 29, 1902. Route R buses replaced Ardmore trolleys on December 30, 1966. Route C ran to Brookline via Earlington Road. Route C and R merged into new Route 103 on January 22, 1971. On June 30, 1986, service via Llanerch was eliminated thus cutting out the original route that the trolley took to Ardmore between Highland Park (Upper Darby) and Brookline (Haverford). On August 19, 2002, service in Ardmore was extended to Suburban Square. Service was rerouted via Overbrook Park replacing Route 105 service on February 14, 2011. The private busway in the Oakmont section of Havertown was the former trolley right of way.	Sunday Service only operates between 69th Street Transportation Center and Overbrook Park	1,362
103	69th Street Transit Center	77th and City	Brookline Boulevard, Darby Road, SEPTA Private Busway		Sunday Service only operates between 69th Street Transportation Center and Overbrook Park	1,362
104	69th Street Transit Center	West Chester University or Newtown Square	West Chester Pike	Formerly known as Red Arrow Route "W". Trolley service to West Chester began August 15, 1895. Route W buses replaced trolleys to West Chester on June 4, 1954 then to Westgate Hills on August 23, 1958. Route W Lawrence Park service began in 1959. Route W redesignated Route 104 on June 16, 1975. Service to Lawrence Park transferred to new Route 112 on June 30, 1986. Service to Cheyney University then known as Route 104A became new Route 120 on the same date. On August 19, 2002, service was extended to the West Chester University campus.		3,088
105	69th Street Transit Center	Rosemont or Paoli	Lancaster Avenue	Formerly known as Red Arrow Routes "G (Wynnewood)" and "I (Ardmore via Narberth)". Routes G and I merged into new Route 105 on September 11, 1970; Service extended to Paoli on November 28, 1983, via old SEPTA Route 71 (Formerly: Red Arrow Route Z). On February 14, 2011, service was rerouted via 68th Street and Malvern Ave, in the Overbrook section of Philadelphia. Route 103 replaced service in the Overbrook Park section of Philadelphia. Service on Route Z was a former "Montgomery Bus Lines" service acquired by the Red Arrow in 1936. Due to duplicate service with SEPTA Bus Route 106, route was truncated from Paoli to Rosemont (at SEPTA's Rosemont train station on the Paoli/Thorndale Line) effective June 20, 2016. Extended back to Paoli to replace Route 106 on August 24, 2026.	Sunday service only operates between 69th Street Transportation Center and Rosemont station	1,147 + 1,251 from 106
107	69th Street Transit Center	Glenolden or Lawrence Park	Garrett Road, Marshall Road, Ashland Avenue, Sproul Road	Formerly known as Red Arrow's Routes "B" and "P". Route B was Westbrook Park LOCAL. Route P was Briarcliffe EXPRESS. Routes B and P merged into new Route 107 on June 17, 1974; At the same time service was extended to Essington. Service has been restructured in 1983, 1996 and 2006. Route 122 merged into Route 107 on August 28, 2006. Service also extended to Lawrence Park. Current route to Glenolden almost resembles original Route 107 routing with a few different changes. Express service eliminated in 2022.	No Sunday Service.	1,042
108	69th Street Transit Center	67th and Elmwood or Philadelphia International Airport	Church Lane, 65th Street, Bartram Avenue	Formerly known as Red Arrow Route "J" to 67th and Elmwood; Service started by Red Star Lines. Route sold to Red Arrow October 27, 1930. Route J redesignated Route 108 on June 16, 1975; Service extended to the Philadelphia International Airport when former City Transit Division Route "U" (Airport to Elmwood) was merged into the Route 108 on April 4, 1993.	24-hour service	5,274
109	69th Street Transit Center	Chester Transit Center	Baltimore Pike, Chester Road	Formerly Red Arrow's Route "O"; Service was first operated by John Drew Bus Lines to Lansdowne. Route sold to the Red Arrow on September 3, 1930. Route O redesignated Route 109 on September 9, 1974. Route 109 has the highest fare box recovery ratio in SEPTA's Suburban Transit Division at 40% (FY 2009 figures). Southern Penn Traction Company operated a trolley line on Baltimore Pike. Red Arrow purchased the trolley line and "Route N" buses replaced streetcars on August 3, 1930; Route N no longer in service.	24-hour service	4,474
110	69th Street Transit Center	Springfield Mall, Penn State Brandywine or Pilgrim Gardens	Township Line Road, Sproul Road, Baltimore Pike	Formerly labeled by Red Arrow as Route "X". Route X first served Media, Broomall branch started service in 1953. Service to Media eliminated in 1959. Route X redesignated Route 110 on June 16, 1975. Springfield Mall branch started January 30, 1978. Service extended to Media and Granite Run Mall June 30, 1986, via the Springfield Mall branch routing. Service to Broomall transferred to new Route 112.		1,880
111	69th Street Transit Center	Penn State Brandywine, or Chadds Ford	State Road, US 1/Media Bypass, Baltimore Pike	This was Red Arrow Lines first bus route operated under the name of Aronimink Transportation Company. Service to Aronimink was formerly known as Red Arrow's Route "A"; Route A redesignated Route 111 on June 16, 1975. Service on this route has been restructured in 1983, 1996, and 2002. Service to Chadds Ford introduced on August 19, 2002, replacing former SEPTA Route 110 Express service to Granite Run Mall. Service rerouted to serve new Wawa Station on August 29, 2022.		1,473
112	69th Street Transit Center	Delaware County Community College	West Chester Pike	This is SEPTA's second version of Route 112. Formerly portions of Route 103 routing via Llanerch, Route 104 Lawrence Park spur routing, Route 110 Broomall branch routing, and Media Line Road portion of Route 80 (Currently Route 118). Split from Route 104 service on June 30, 1986. On August 29, 2011, service was streamlined to operate on West Chester Pike from 69th Street Terminal to Broomall. Service to Lawrence Park replaced by new Route 126. The first version of Route 112 ran from 69th Street Terminal to the Oakview section of Upper Darby. Formerly: Red Arrow's Route "F" redesignated Route 112 on June 16, 1975. Service eliminated November 28, 1983. Service between 69th Street Terminal and Lansdowne Ave. merged into Route 113. Oakview loop merged into Route 107.	No Sunday Service.	1,015
113	69th Street Transit Center	Darby Transit Center, Chester Transit Center, or Claymont	Lansdowne Avenue, MacDade Boulevard, 3rd Street And Ridge Road	Formerly labeled Red Arrow Route "M" to Darby. This is the oldest still operating bus service in Southeastern Pennsylvania. Service started by John Drew Bus Lines on February 17, 1919. Sold to the Red Arrow on September 3, 1930. Service extended to the Airport on July 18, 1958 with service cut back to Darby in 1962. Route M redesignated Route 113 on June 16, 1975. Route 112 (First SEPTA Route 112) Former Red Arrow "Route F" and PTC/Red Arrow Route 76 merged into Route 113 November 28, 1983, providing a long route to Marcus Hook. Route 76 was a former PRT Folsom Division trolley line (Darby to Chester). Service was rerouted and extended to the Tri-State Mall in Claymont, Delaware while service to Marcus Hook was transferred to Route 119 February 9, 2009. On November 29, 2021, service to the Tri-State Mall was eliminated and rerouted to terminate at Northtowne Plaza in Claymont. On December 4, 2023, service rerouted to new Claymont station. Route 113 has the highest ridership of all Suburban Transit Division bus routes (FY 2009: 1,689,350 annual riders)	Connection with DART First State Route 13 and Route 61 bus service be made in Claymont.	6,787
114	Darby Transit Center	Chester Transit Center, I-95 Industrial Park, Penn State Brandywine, or Wawa Station	Chester Pike, 9th Street, Pennell Road	Darby to Chester service was formerly Southern Penn Traction Company's trolley service to Chester and Wilmington; Buses replace trolleys December 13, 1938. Red Arrow took control of bus service on June 30, 1960. SEPTA designated the line Route 74 when it took over on January 29, 1970. Redesignated Route 114 on June 30, 1986. The Village Green to Granite Run Mall portion of former 116 merged into the route on November 22, 2004. Service rerouted to serve new Wawa Station on August 29, 2022, with limited trips serving Penn State Brandywine.	Some weekday trips serve 7th and Yarnall Streets in Chester	1,898
115	Delaware County Community College or Darby Transit Center	Philadelphia International Airport	Calcon Hook Road, Oak Avenue, Lansdowne Avenue, Darby Road, West Chester Pike	The Darby to Brookline service was formerly Red Arrow's "Route H"; Route H redesignated Route 83 on June 16, 1975; The Darby to Delmar Village service was formerly Southern Penn Lines/Red Arrow Route 72; Routes 72 and 83 merged into new Route 115 on June 30, 1986. Delmar Village to Glenolden (MacDade Mall) extended in October 2002 service cut back to Brookline at the same time; service was restored to Ardmore on November 3, 2008; service to Airport added through merger of former Route 305 on June 15, 2009; service to Glenolden (MacDade Mall) was eliminated at the same time due to the merger and due to MacDade Mall management booting the 115 bus off their property in October 2008. On August 29, 2011, the service north of Darby was rerouted via Manoa Road, West Chester Pike, and Media Line Road to Delaware County Community College. This route connects the Southeast campus and the Main Campus of Delaware County Community College.	Service between Darby and Delaware County Community College operates only on weekdays.	1,174
117	I-95 Industrial Park	Penn State Brandywine	9th Street, Middletown Road	This route is a mix of former Southern Penn Traction Company trolley lines in Chester. Converted to bus operations in the mid 1930s. Southern Penn Bus Lines continued to operate them as different routes and then narrowed it down to two routes until Red Arrow Lines took control of these lines on June 30, 1960. These two lines were designated Routes 68 (3rd & Highland, Chester to Brookhaven) and 69 (Chester to Buckman Village and Highland Village) when SEPTA took over. Routes 68 and 69 merged into new SEPTA Route 70 on June 18, 1973. Redesignated Route 117 on June 30, 1986. New Route 119 created as a spin-off of Route 117 on September 9, 1991, service was also extended to West Chester via Cheyney University. Service between Penn State (Lima Campus) and West Chester eliminated on December 12, 1996. Route 119 rerouted to service portion of route Cheyney University to West Chester.		1,984
118	Chester Transit Center	Newtown Square	Brookhaven Road, Providence Road, Newtown Street Road	Formerly: Southern Penn Traction trolley service "Routes 1 and 4"; buses replace trolley cars on April 12, 1930. Service sold to Red Arrow Lines on June 30, 1960. SEPTA designated the line as "Route 80" when it took over control on January 29, 1970. Redesignated Route 118 on June 30, 1986. Service extended to the King of Prussia Mall complex via Paoli June 17, 1991. Service cut back to Newtown Square November 22, 2004.	No Sunday Service.	511
119	Chester Transit Center	Cheyney University	7th Street, Conchester Highway, Cheyney Road	Route 119 began service on September 9, 1991, as a spin-off of Route 117 and as a replacement for SEPTA commuter rail service to West Chester. Service to Boothwyn was operated by Route 114 until November 22, 2004, when Route 119 was rerouted to serve Boothwyn at the same time service between Cheyney and West Chester was eliminated; service re-routed via Marcus Hook in February 2009. On August 29, 2011, service beyond the Chester Transit Center to Harrah's was eliminated at the same time the loop routing in Marcus Hook was eliminated in favor of a simple route through Marcus Hook.		687
120	69th Street Transit Center	Cheyney University	West Chester Pike, Street Road	Service began September 6, 1968 as a spur of Route W that also operated into Center City Philadelphia. Service into Philadelphia was cut back to 69th Street Terminal on September 9, 1974. Service redesignated Route 104 on June 16, 1975; Service was known as Route 104A on September 1, 1977. Route 104A was separated from Route 104 service and redesignated Route 120 on September 8, 1986.		531
123 EXPRESS	69th Street Transit Center	King of Prussia	West Chester Pike, I-476, Schuylkill Expressway	Service started on September 14, 1998, as an alternative to transferring between the Norristown High Speed Line and Routes 124/125 at Gulph Mills. All trips converted to EXPRESS service on September 2, 2013.		893
125	13th and Market	King of Prussia or Valley Forge	Schuylkill Expressway, S Gulph Rd, Market Street	Service began July 30, 1962 as Route 45. It started as a combined Red Arrow/PTC joint operation; under SEPTA it was a combined Suburban/City Transit operation until November 26, 1989, when the Route 45 was redesignated Route 125 and new Route 124 was created as a spin-off of Route 45 to service Henderson Road and Chesterbrook. Today Victory Depot (Formerly: Red Arrow Lines) operates the Route 125 while Frontier operates the Route 124.		2219
126	69th Street Transit Center	Lawrence Park	West Chester Pike	Service began on August 29, 2011, replacing Route 112's Lawrence Park service, Service uses Glendale Road to get to Lawrence Park Industrial Center and Lawrence Park Shopping Center instead of Lawrence Road. Service through the residential section of Lawrence Park operates Clockwise during the early day, then counter clockwise during afternoon and evening periods.	Sunday service began on Route 126, as of June 16, 2014.	638

=== Frontier District ===
These routes are operated from the Frontier garage in Plymouth Township, Montgomery County. This district of SEPTA was created through a combination of former Schuylkill Valley Line services in the Norristown area and Trenton Philadelphia Coach Line services in the Lower Bucks County area. Routes 96 to 99 which helped form the original five SEPTA Frontier District Routes were once part of the old "Schuylkill Valley Lines" that SEPTA acquired on March 1, 1976. The old Schuylkill Valley Lines routes were then restructured into five routes on March 7, 1977, with Route 95 being a new route. Routes 127 to 129 were once part of the old Trenton Philadelphia Coach Lines "TPC" which became a subsidiary of the Philadelphia Transportation Company "PTC" on January 24, 1963. When SEPTA took over PTC, Trenton Philadelphia Coach became a subsidiary of SEPTA. These routes were assigned Routes 150 to 153 in 1980. These routes continued to operate under SEPTA/TPC until November 14, 1983, when SEPTA Frontier District took over the operations of these routes and rebranded them Routes 127, 128, and 129. All other routes have been added onto the system since then. Trenton-Philadelphia Coach Lines was brought back to life by SEPTA as a contract operation for its Routes 310, 311 and LUCY (Route 316) operations. Trenton-Philadelphia Coach also operated the Cornwells Heights Parking Shuttle (Route 312)

Route	Terminals		Major streets	History	Notes	Daily Ridership (Fall 2023)
90	Norristown Transit Center	Plymouth Meeting Mall	Markley St, Swede St, Germantown Pike	Service started October 31, 2005; Split from Route 97; Service operates over a former Schuylkill Valley Lines bus route to Norristown State Hospital which was taken over by SEPTA in 1976. Service on this route has been operated by portions of Route 99 until October 11, 1982, and then Route 97 until October 31, 2005. The earlier Route 90 was in the SEPTA City Division.	No Sunday Service.	287
91	Norristown Transit Center	SCI Phoenix	Ridge Pike, Valley Forge Road, Skippack Pike	This is the second version of Route 91. The first Route 91 operated between West Chester and Oxford via Kennett Square and only lasted from July 6, 1982, to June 30, 1983. The current Route 91 service began May 3, 1986; Weekday service eliminated December 21, 1996, due to SEPTA money constraints. Service indefinitely suspended since April 9, 2020, due to the COVID-19 pandemic.	Operated only on Saturdays. Service officially "suspended" since April 9, 2020, and slated for formal elimination in 2025.	
92	West Chester Transit Center	King of Prussia	Phoenixville Pike, King Road, Lancaster Avenue, Swedesford Road	Service began on October 11, 1982; New Route 133 split from Route 92 on November 20, 2000; Route 133 merged back into Route 92 on September 5, 2006. Route 314 was merged into the Route 92 on October 30, 2011, at the same time service was restructured to begin at Exton Square Mall then serve West Goshen Corporate Park and West Chester. After leaving West Chester the route continued via Malvern, Paoli to King of Prussia. On August 1, 2021, service cut back from Exton to West Chester Transportation Center concurrent with the introduction of Route 135.	Weekday evening and Saturday service bypasses industrial parks.; No Sunday Service.	171
93	Norristown Transit Center	Pottstown	Ridge Pike	Service began March 9, 1981, as a replacement bus route for SEPTA commuter rail service to Pottstown. Service to Collegeville was a former Schuylkill Valley Lines bus route. Service to Collegeville was operated under Route 97 until October 11, 1982. Service rerouted into Philadelphia Premium Outlets.	Additional midday service began October 30, 2011.	943
94	Chestnut Hill	Montgomery Mall	Bethlehem Pike, Morris Road	Service began on May 17, 1982. Routing covers most of a former North Penn Bus Company bus route that replaced a branch of Lehigh Valley Transit's high speed line from Chestnut Hill to North Wales. Route 94 Express service was added April 2, 2000. Route 94 Express service was redesignated as new Route 134 on October 30, 2005. Route 134 discontinued on June 15, 2012.		283
95	Willow Grove Park Mall	Gulph Mills station	Fitzwatertown Road, Pennsylvania Avenue, Butler Pike	This route is one of SEPTA's original Frontier bus routes started on March 7, 1977. Service operated between King of Prussia and Plymouth Meeting malls. Service on this route has been restructured several times. Service to King of Prussia Mall complex was eliminated December 16, 1996. After this date a Route 95X was operated to King of Prussia Mall from Gulph Mills during the holiday shopping season until the creation of Route 123. Service extended to Willow Grove via the Route 98 routing beyond the Plymouth Meeting Mall on October 30, 2011.	No Sunday Service.	322
96	Norristown Transit Center	Lansdale station	DeKalb Pike	Formerly a North Penn Bus Company bus route that replaced Lehigh Valley Transit's "Liberty Bell Limited" service between Lansdale and Norristown. Service was taken over by Schuylkill Valley Lines. This was one of SEPTA's original Frontier bus routes started on March 7, 1977. Service only operated as far north as Penn Square originally. Saturday service was extended to Montgomery Mall on July 25, 1977, then to Lansdale on March 18, 1978. Weekday service to Lansdale and Telford started November 6, 1978. Service between Lansdale and Telford was transferred to new Route 132 on October 30, 2005.		980
97	Norristown Transit Center	Chestnut Hill	Ridge Pike, Fayette Street, Hector Street	This route is one of SEPTA's five original Frontier bus routes started on March 7, 1977. Service operates over a former Schuylkill Valley Line service to Conshohocken and Spring Mill. The Route 97 was the last of the through routed bus services in Norristown when the western end of the service was broken off and became new Route 90 on October 31, 2005. The current form of Route 97 was extended to Barren Hill on October 31, 2005. Service was extended to Chestnut Hill Loop on February 13, 2011.		541
98	Norristown Transit Center	Plymouth Meeting Mall or Blue Bell	New Hope Street, Germantown Pike, Township Line Road, Union Meeting Road	This is one of the five original SEPTA Frontier bus routes started March 7, 1977. Service operates over a former Schuylkill Valley Line bus route and also replaced former SEPTA Route L bus service to Norristown which replaced Auch Inter-Borough bus line service that went out of business on December 17, 1973. Service was extended to Willow Grove on April 11, 1988. Service was rerouted to service the Blue Bell Office Campus on April 7, 1996. Service on the western end of Route 98 from Norristown to Oaks was broken off and became new Route 131 on June 20, 1999. Service between Plymouth Meeting Mall and Willow Grove transferred to Route 95 on October 30, 2011. Route changed on February 21, 2016, to run from Blue Bell via Plymouth Meeting Mall instead of Plymouth Meeting Mall via Blue Bell.	Weekend service terminates at Plymouth Meeting Mall.	553
99	Norristown Transit Center	King of Prussia and Phoenixville	DeKalb Pike, Egypt Road, Schuylkill Road	This is one of the five original SEPTA Frontier bus routes started March 7, 1977. Service operates over a former Schuylkill Valley Line bus route to King of Prussia. Service was extended to Phoenixville on August 10, 1981, replacing former joint SEPTA/Werner Coach Line Route 130 as providing a replacement bus route for commuter rail service to Phoenixville. Service extended to Royersford June 7, 1982. Through route service to Norristown State Hospital replaced by rerouted Route 97 on October 11, 1982. Service extended to Pottstown on June 20, 1989. Service cut back to Royersford October 26, 1993. Service was rerouted from Valley Forge Road to Oaks and Egypt Road June 20, 1999. Service west of Phoenixville to Royersford transferred to new Route 139 on August 31, 2008.	Service as of June 15, 2014, trips now include the Oaks Shopping Center.	960
124	Center City	King of Prussia or Chesterbrook	Market Street, Schuylkill Expressway, Henderson Road, Swedesford Road	This route was created as a spur of Route 45 redesignated Route 125 on November 26, 1989. Service rerouted off of Chesterbrook Blvd. onto Swedesford Road on September 3, 2006.		1,164
127	Oxford Valley Mall	Trenton Transit Center	Lincoln Highway, Levittown Parkway, West Trenton Avenue	Service on this route started approximately 1930 by East Coast Coach Company reorganized under the name of Trenton Philadelphia Coach Company in August 1931. This was their main bus line from Trenton to Center City Philadelphia known as "Route 10". On July 1, 1977, this line was given the Route 150 designator under SEPTA/TPC operations with Oxford Valley Mall serving as the new southern terminal point for service. On November 14, 1983, service was redesignated Route 127. Service was cut back from Trenton on April 28, 1986. Service was restored to Trenton April 2, 1990. Service was rerouted via Levittown on November 20, 2000. Service was cut back from Neshaminy Mall to Oxford Valley Mall on October 30, 2011.	No Sunday Service.; Connections can be made with NJ Transit bus in Trenton at Downtown Trenton and Trenton Transit Center for service within Trenton, and outlying areas. River Line to Camden, and Northeast Corridor Line to Newark and New York at Trenton Transit Center.	208
128	Neshaminy Mall	Oxford Valley Mall	Street Road, Bristol Pike, State Road	This service started as Route 152. This route was a new route added to the SEPTA/Trenton Philadelphia Coach on July 1, 1977, as part of a reorganization of SEPTA/TPC lines. Service operated from Oxford Valley Mall and circulated throughout Bristol Township. Service was restructured and redesignated Route 128 on November 14, 1983. Service has been restructured several times over the past few years as this route struggles with ridership and cost recovery.	No Sunday Service.	282
129	Morrell Park	Oxford Valley Mall	Knights Road, Bensalem Boulevard, Beaver Dam Road, Durham Road	This route started out in November 1952 as Trenton Philadelphia Coach Line's route from Levittown to Center City Philadelphia. On March 1, 1964 service to Philadelphia was cut back to Country Club Shopping Center (US 1 & PA 413). On July 1, 1977, service was given the Route 151 designator and Oxford Valley Mall became the terminal point. On November 14, 1983, service was restructured and combined with former "SEPTA/Colonial Coach Line" Route 153 into new Route 129 from Morrell Park to Oxford Valley Mall. Service has been restructured several times since then.		629
130	Morrell Park	Bucks County Community College	Street Road, Neshaminy Boulevard, Newtown-Langhorne Road	This service started out as the Route 14 Shuttle bus replacing what was through routed Route 14 bus service Frankford Terminal and Oxford Valley Mall via Neshaminy residential sections. Service was transferred to SEPTA Frontier District and redesignated Route 130 on September 12, 1988, as part of a reorganization of bus service in Northeast Philadelphia. This remained a short shuttle like service until November 19, 2000, when service was extended to Franklin Mills and Bucks County Community College in Newtown. This extension replaced the poorly patronized Route 301 shuttle (Formerly: Fox-Chase Newtown Shuttle Bus) that replaced rail service between Fox Chase and Newtown on January 15, 1983. Extended to Morrell Park on October 30, 2011. Weekday peak hour service cross routed with Routes 129 and 133 at Morrell Park.	Sunday service operates between Morrell Park and Neshaminy Mall only.	409
131	Norristown Transit Center	Audubon	Marshall St, Egypt Rd	This route follows an old Schuylkill Valley Line route to Oaks and Phoenixville. This service became the western side of Route 98 on March 7, 1977. Service was separated from Route 98 June 21, 1999, and designated Route 131. Sunday service added on August 26, 2018.		576
132	Montgomery Mall	Telford	Horsham Road, Welsh Road, Forty Foot Road, County Line Road	This new route replaced Route 96 service between Montgomery Mall and Telford October 31, 2005. New Sunday service was introduced to this area at the same time.		294
133	Morrell Park	Eddington station	State Road	Service started January 15, 2001, between Morrell Park and Bristol Regional Rail Station as Route 304, replacing a portion of Route 129. Off peak/Saturday service eliminated and route cut back at Eddington on October 30, 2011. Route 304 redesignated Route 133 on October 31, 2011. Service between Eddington and Bristol eliminated. Service cross routed with Routes 129 and 130 at Morrell Park.	Rush Hour Service Only. No Weekend Service	46
135	Coatesville	West Chester Transit Center	Lincoln Highway, Pottstown Pike	Service began August 1, 2021, replacing the Krapf "A" bus operated by Krapf Transit. Trolley service between Coatesville and West Chester was originally operated by West Chester Traction. Reeder's Inc. took over service after Short Line of Pennsylvania ended operations. In 1977, SEPTA and Reeder's began the Route 120 bus service between Coatesville and West Chester. Reeder's continued operating the route after SEPTA pulled funding. The Krapf "A" bus began service in 1992, replacing SEPTA Route 120. In 2020, the COVID-19 pandemic caused a reduction in ridership, and SEPTA began providing more than $810,000 in subsidies to Krapf to continue operating the route. SEPTA took over the route to maintain service as Krapf was unable to show it could operate the route without subsidies.		656
139	King of Prussia	Limerick	Valley Forge Road, Schuylkill Road, Township Line Road	Service started August 31, 2008. This route restored bus service via Valley Forge National Historical Park and Valley Forge Road that the Route 99 once served. This new route also replaced Route 99 service between Phoenixville and Royersford. New service was also added to the Philadelphia Premium Outlet center in Limerick. Service between Royersford and Philadelphia Premium Outlets eliminated in October 2011 and redirected to Township Line Rd. & Ridge Pike.	No Sunday Service.	303
150	Plymouth Meeting Mall	Parx Casino	Pennsylvania Turnpike	New SEPTA service started February 12, 2007. This service is made up of what would normally be out of service dead head trips from the Frontier Bus Garage in Plymouth Meeting and the Bucks County Routes. This is the first time any transit service was operated via the Pennsylvania Turnpike.	Limited Non-stop service is offered Monday through Saturday	26
201	Fort Washington station	Fort Washington Office Center	Commerce Drive, Virginia Drive	Service began April 11, 1988; First bus route of SEPTA's new "200 Series Route Program" that connects SEPTA's Regional Rail Lines to commercial developments.	Service operates Monday thru Friday only.	48
204	Paoli Railroad Station	Lionville	Lincoln Highway; Pottstown Pike; Eagleview Boulevard	Service began operation on June 21, 1999, and was operated by Krapf Transit for SEPTA. In 2025, SEPTA took over operation of the route from Krapf. Service is offered between Paoli and the Eagleview Office Campus Monday thru Friday. Saturday service operates between Paoli and the shopping centers in Lionville. On Sunday service only operates between Paoli and the Exton Square Mall. Connection can be made to SEPTA Route 135 at Exton.		123
206	Paoli station	Great Valley Corporate Center	Lancaster Avenue, Morehall Road	Service started May 7, 1984, known as Route 126; service redesignated as Route 206 April 11, 1988, to join the "200 Series Route Program". Service restructured September 3, 2019, to absorb a portion of the discontinued Route 205 between Paoli Hospital and Great Valley Corporate Center.	Service operates Monday thru Friday only.	71

=== Krapf Transit ===
Service on these lines were operated by Krapf Transit under contract to SEPTA. These routes were operated from Krapf's own garage, located in West Chester, Pennsylvania. Krapf operated bus routes for SEPTA in the past: Route 202 (West Chester to Wilmington), Route 204 (Paoli Railroad Station to Eagleview), Route 205 (Paoli Railroad Station to Chesterbrook), Route 207 (The West Whiteland WHIRL), Route 208 (Strafford Train Station to Chesterbrook), Route 306 (Great Valley to Brandywine Towne Center in Delaware) and Route 314 (West Chester to Goshen Corporate Park).

SEPTA has had contract bus operations before in Chester County. SEPTA and Reeder's Inc. joined forces in 1977 to operate three bus routes out of West Chester. These routes were the Route 120 (West Chester to Coatesville), Route 121 (West Chester to Paoli), and Route 122 (West Chester to Oxford). Reeder's also operated their own bus route from West Chester to Concord and Tri-State Malls via US 202 and Delaware Route 92. Transit operations in Chester County has been around for decades operating under different companies over those years. West Chester Transportation Company, People's Transportation Company, Chester Valley Lines and The Short Line of Pennsylvania have operated bus routes in Chester County.

Bus service between West Chester and Coatesville was a replacement for the previous trolley service operated by West Chester Traction. Reeder's got these routes when the Short Line of Pennsylvania ceased operations. To keep transit service operating in Chester County these routes were funded by SEPTA and operated by Reeder's Inc. beginning November 7, 1977. SEPTA did replace two of the routes with their own bus service. Route 122 service was replaced by SEPTA's Route 91 on July 6, 1982, after only one year of service; Route 91 was eliminated due to lack of ridership. Route 121 was replaced by SEPTA's Route 92 on October 11, 1982; this service continues to operate today.

Since ridership on the Route 120 was strong it continued to operate under the operations of Reeder's Inc. even after SEPTA pulled the funding source. Reeder's Inc bus service to Concord and Tri-State Malls was discontinued in the late 1970s. Krapf purchased the Reeder's operation in 1992 and designated the remaining (West Chester to Coatesville) bus route as Krapf's Transit "Route A". Krapf's owned the Route A. On August 1, 2021, the Route A was replaced by SEPTA Route 135. Krapf's also operates the Coatesville Link that serves the Coatesville area and the SCCOOT in Southern Chester County for the Transportation Management Association of Chester County (TMACC).

The Route 205 service started March 12, 2007, between Paoli Train Station and Main Line Industrial Park, On September 7, 2010, service was extended to Phoenixville. Service to Main Line Industrial Park eliminated at the same time. Service was then rerouted to Chesterbrook after that. Service on the Route 205 was eliminated September 3, 2019. The Route 205 bus only operated on Weekdays. The Route 204 began operation on June 21, 1999. Service was offered between Paoli and the Eagleview Office Campus Monday thru Friday. Saturday service operated between Paoli and the shopping centers in Lionville. On Sunday service only operated between Paoli and the Exton Square Mall. Small 30 foot buses were operated on this route. In 2025, SEPTA took over operation of this route from Krapf.

Krapf's along with SEPTA and the Independence Visitor Center work together to operate the PHLASH bus service. The PHLASH bus service is geared toward tourists visiting the City of Philadelphia but locals use it too since the one way fare is cheaper than SEPTA bus fare, The PHLASH operates April to May on Fridays and weekends then operates seven days a week from Memorial Day through Labor Day. After Labor Day service goes back to Friday and weekend until Thanksgiving then back to seven days a week until the end of the year. After that PHLASH service is suspended for the winter until April.

== See also ==
- SEPTA City Transit Division surface routes
