= Philly Phlash =

Tourist-oriented bus route in Philadelphia, Pennsylvania, US

Philly PHLASH Loop
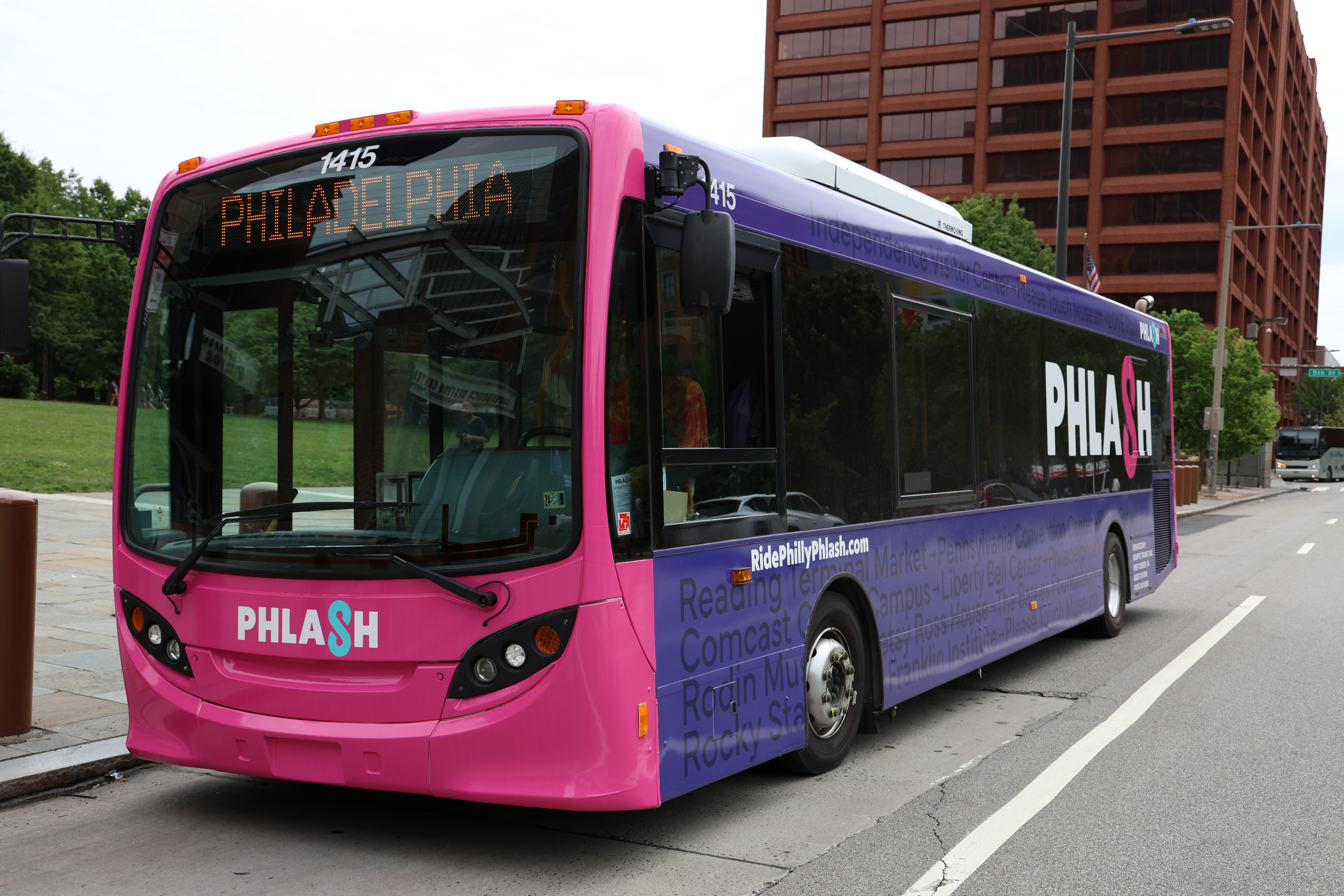
- The Philly PHLASH bus parked outside the Independence Visitor Center.

Overview
- Operator: Philadelphia Visitor Center in partnership with SEPTA. Vehicle service provided by Krapf Transit
- Vehicle: New Flyer MiDi, New Flyer XD40, Alexander Dennis Enviro200
- Status: Operational
- Began service: 1994

Routes
- Routes: 2
- Locale: Philadelphia, Pennsylvania
- Stations: 24

Service
- Ridership: 75,000 (2024)

The Philly PHLASH Downtown Loop (also known as the Philly PHLASH or PHLASH) is a visitor-friendly public transit service in Philadelphia, Pennsylvania, managed by the Philadelphia Visitor Center Corporation (PVCC). PHLASH vehicles are ADA-compliant, temperature-controlled New Flyer MiDi buses. The PVCC contracted Krapf Transit to manage vehicle operations.

The PHLASH route is particularly notable for connecting Philadelphia's main tourist attractions, from Penn's Landing on the Delaware River Waterfront, to National Park Service sites like Independence Hall and the Liberty Bell in Independence National Historical Park, to cultural institutions along the Benjamin Franklin Parkway like the Philadelphia Museum of Art, and attractions like the Philadelphia Zoo and Please Touch Museum in Fairmount Park.

More of the attractions located close to the PHLASH route are:

- Penn's Landing
- National Museum of American Jewish History
- Independence Hall
- Liberty Bell
- Museum of the American Revolution
- National Constitution Center
- Pennsylvania Convention Center
- Reading Terminal Market
- The Franklin Institute
- Barnes Foundation
- Philadelphia Museum of Art
- Rodin Museum
- Eastern State Penitentiary
- Please Touch Museum
- Philadelphia Zoo
- Mütter Museum
- Comcast Center
- The Fashion District

The PHLASH runs weekend (Friday, Saturday, Sunday) service in the spring and fall, and daily service during the summer season, from 10 a.m. to 6 p.m. on operating days. PHLASH service caters mostly to tourists who are not familiar with the city landscape. The fare is $5 for a one-day pass, $15 for a family pass (two adults, two kids), but is free for all SEPTA Key holders, seniors 65 and over, and children 4 and under. Riders can hop-on and hop-off all day with each pass.

== Service history ==
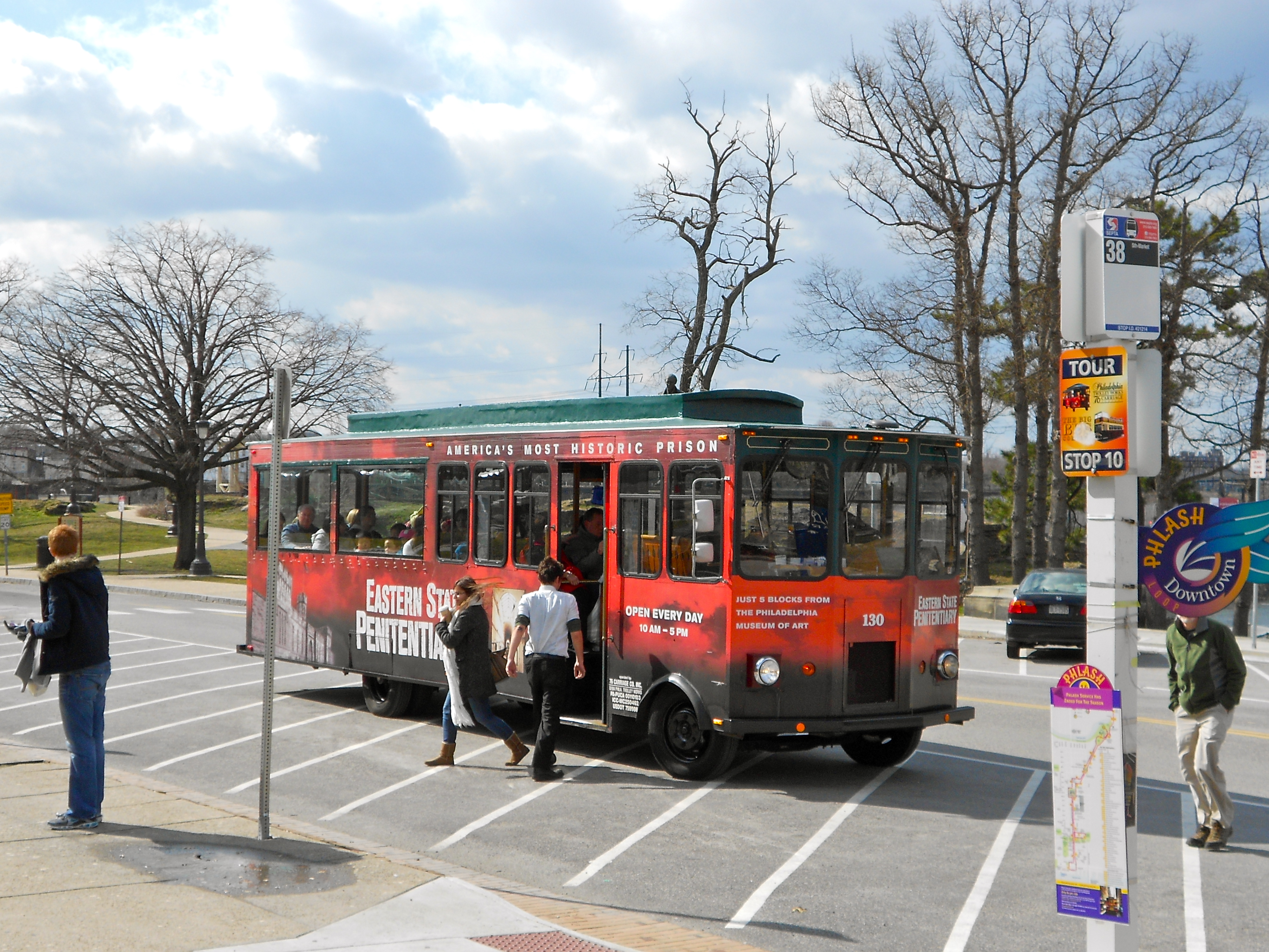
An older bus of PHLASH, which operated trolley replicas until 2014.

The PHLASH was first introduced in 1994 by then Philadelphia Mayor Ed Rendell. Michael Masch, the Philadelphia budget director at the time, helped create the transit line naming it after his favorite DC Comics character Flash. The service was operated by the city's Center City District starting in the late 1990s. In order to keep fares at a price point attractive to visitors, the PHLASH service has always been subsidized.

By 2011, the state grant that had been providing a subsidy for PHLASH operations was almost exhausted. With Gov. Rendell was leaving the governor's office, additional funding didn't appear to be forthcoming, and the service was in danger of shutting down.

In 2012, The PVCC took over management of the PHLASH under CEO, James J. Cuorato, who believed the PHLASH provided an important service for Philadelphia tourism. Cuorato was able to successfully secure funding by convincing the state legislature to include an allotment for PHLASH in its Transportation Package bill, by partnering with Philadelphia's public transportation provider, SEPTA.

In 2016, PHLASH had a record-breaking season, with 314,000 riders.

== Fleet ==
All buses are ADA compliant. Prior to the current fleet, the PHLASH operated with replica trolley buses. The service is operated by Krapf Transit.

Fleet number(s)	Photo	Year	Manufacturer	Model	Engine	Transmission	Notes
1315		2013	New Flyer	MiDi 30'	Cummins ISB6.7	Allison B300	
1413, 1415–1417, 1512		2014	New Flyer	MiDi 35'	Cummins ISL9	Allison B300	First known U.S. operator of New Flyer MiDi buses.; 1415 features primarily white paint scheme, instead of purple.
1420-1421		2014	New Flyer	XD40	Cummins ISL9	Allison B400R	Both are wrapped promoting the 2026 FIFA World Cup
1511		2015	New Flyer	MiDi 30'	Cummins ISB6.7	Allison B300	
1811		2018	Alexander Dennis	Enviro200	Cummins B6.7	Allison B300R	Equipped with front and rear bumper.
