= SEPTA Route 104 =

Pennsylvania bus route operated by SEPTA

Route 104
- West Chester to 69th Street Transportation Center

Overview
- System: Victory District
- Operator: SEPTA Suburban Transit Division
- Began service: 1895 (streetcar); 1958 (bus)

Route
- Locale: Philadelphia metropolitan area
- Communities served: Newtown Square
- Start: West Chester University
- Via: West Chester Pike
- End: 69th Street Transportation Center
- Daily ridership: 3,088 (FY 2019)
- Annual patronage: 969,632 (FY2019)
- Timetable: Route 104 schedule

Route 104 is a bus route operated by SEPTA between Upper Darby's 69th Street Transportation Center and the North Campus of West Chester University in West Chester, Pennsylvania. Route 104 initially was a streetcar line which operated parallel to the West Chester Pike (PA Route 3) and was operated by the Philadelphia Suburban Transportation Company (a.k.a. "Red Arrow Lines"). The former line spurred the development of streetcar suburbs in Upper Darby, Haverford Township, and communities in Chester County.

== History ==
=== Rail service ===
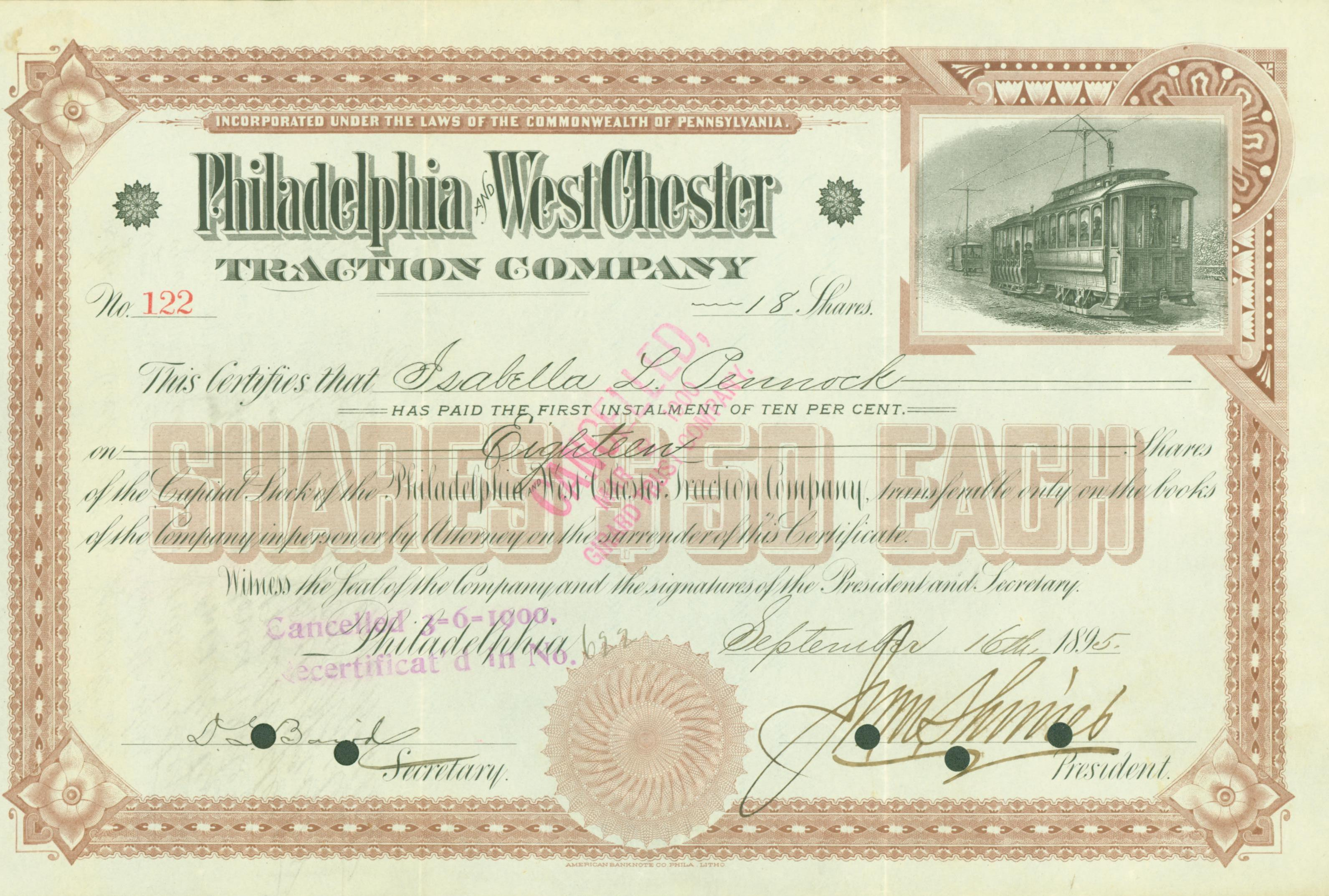
Share of the Philadelphia and West Chester Traction Company, issued 16 September 1895

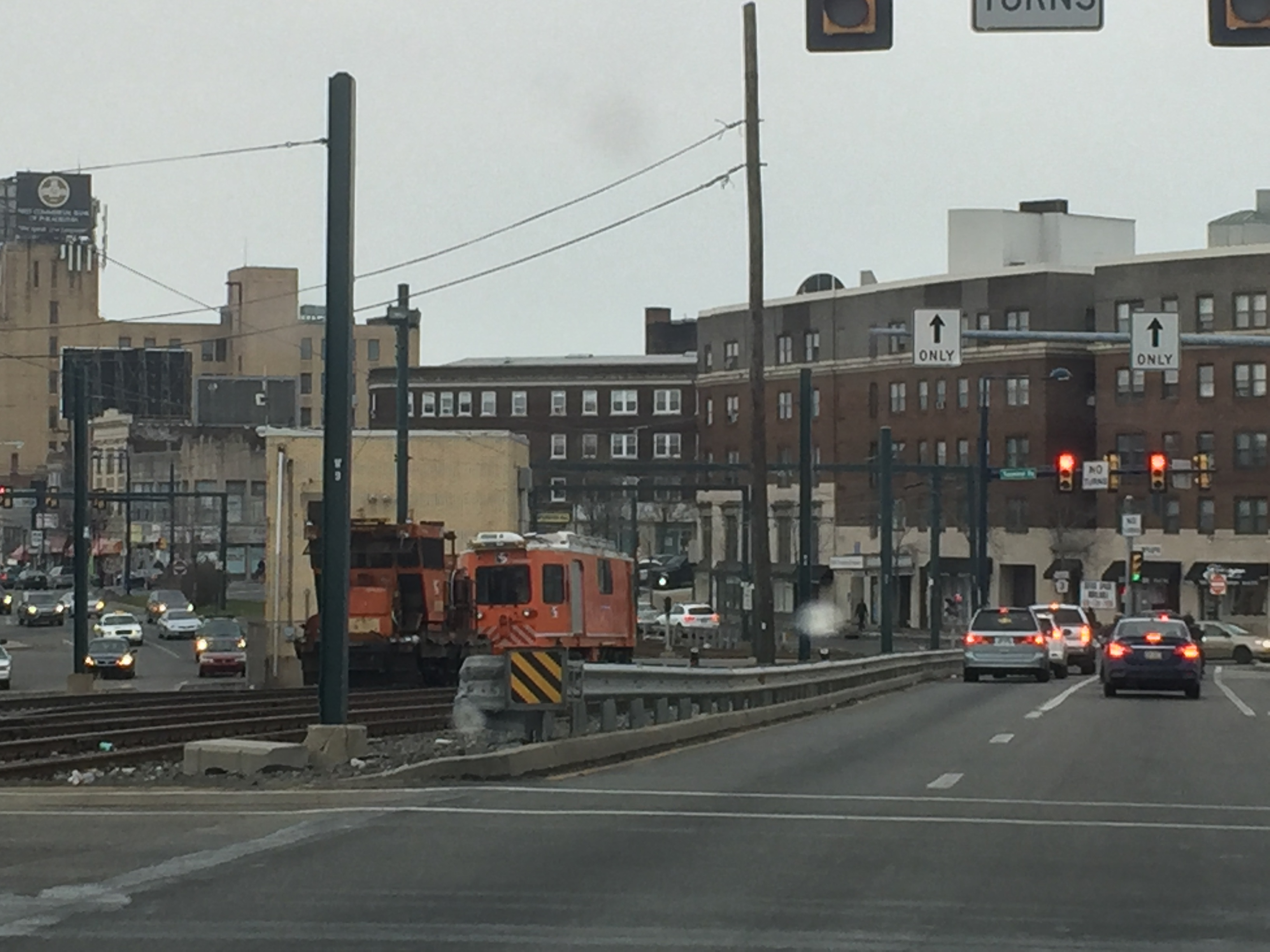
SEPTA trolley tracks in the median of West Chester Pike, originally used by the trolley route

Route 104 was established in 1895, by the newly established Philadelphia and West Chester Traction Company. At the corner of West Chester Pike and Darby Road, construction required the Battle of Llanerch, a frog war between the traction company and the powerful Pennsylvania Railroad (PRR). The railroad correctly recognized that the new trolley line would outcompete passenger services on the PRR Newtown Square Branch.

By 1907, the route operated on a half-hourly clockface schedule, with an end-to-end running time of 78 minutes.

In 1936, the bankrupt P&WC was reorganized as the Philadelphia Suburban Transit Company.

In 1954, rail service was cut back to the Westgate Hills section of Haverford Township in order to allow the Pennsylvania Department of Highways (now PennDOT) to expand the Blue Route into its current configuration. By 1958, all rail service on the West Chester Pike corridor was replaced by bus service.

=== Bus service ===
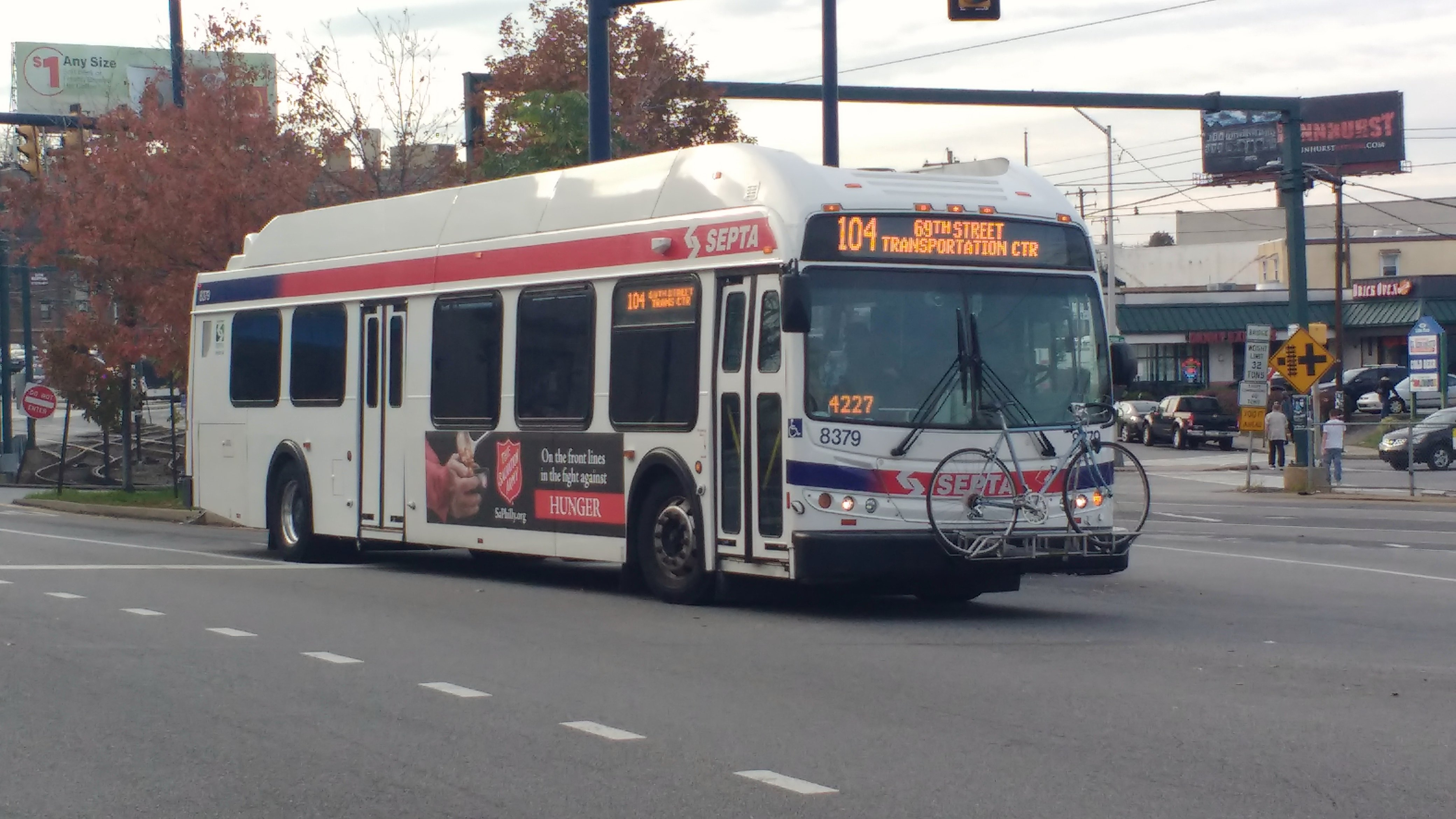
SEPTA Route 104 bus near 69th Street Transportation Center

For many years, bus service operated along the entire length of West Chester Pike between 69th Street Transportation Center and the terminus of the Pike, just east of West Chester Borough, where West Chester Pike and Paoli Pike merge to form Gay Street (from the westbound direction) and Market Street (from the eastbound direction). Service operated via Gay Street, New Street, and Market Street, laying over on Market just east of New.

In the late 1990s, selected weekday peak hour short-turn trips were extended from the center of Newtown Square in Delaware County to serve the Newtown Square Corporate Campus just west of the center of town.

In 2002, service was extended to serve West Chester University, eliminating a 10- to 15-minute walk not just for college students, but also for residents of the borough's south end neighborhoods. This eliminated the simple loop routing that had been in effect for many years previously.

In addition, a new evening routing operated directly into the Edgmont Square Shopping Center, a rapidly developing retail complex in Edgmont Township, just west of the Edgmont/Newtown township boundary.

On March 23, 2023, SEPTA released a new draft plan for Bus Revolution, SEPTA's bus network redesign. As part of the plan, Route 104 trips deviating off West Chester Pike would be eliminated. The final plan, approved on May 23, 2024, retained this change.

== Route description ==
Map of former trolley (now bus) Routes 103 and 104 (orange), as well as existing trolley Routes 101 and 102 (red), and Route 100 (blue)

Today, Route 104 operates service to West Chester every 10–20 minutes during weekday peak hours, every 30 minutes during weekday hours and late Saturday afternoons, and every hour on evenings, Saturdays, and Sundays. Short-turn trips to Newtown Square provide 10-minute headways to that town during weekday peak hours, and 30-minute service levels on Saturdays and Sundays.
