= ViaFast =

ViaFast (corporately styled VIAFast) was an abandoned passenger rail plan that would have cut Via Rail's trip times throughout the Quebec City–Windsor Corridor. ViaFast did not propose true high-speed service throughout the service area, but a series of smaller upgrades to avoid known bottlenecks and provide improved performance at a fraction of the price of entirely new lines. It aimed to reduce the Toronto–Montreal time by about one hour, to 3.5 hours; halving the Montreal–Quebec City time to 2 hours; and reducing Toronto–Windsor time by an hour, to 3.5 hours.

Via services in the Quebec City – Windsor Corridor

Initially studied in 2002, the plan was announced in the last days of the Jean Chrétien government. During the transition to Paul Martin's leadership, members of both the sitting Liberals and their opposition in the Canadian Alliance expressed concerns about the plan and it was quietly abandoned. Details of the ViaFast plan became known to the public in 2009 when it was leaked to Canwest news services.

== The Corridor ==
"The Corridor" is Via Rail's name for passenger services along the Quebec City – Windsor Corridor. This corridor lines pass through 6 of the top 10 largest metropolitan areas in Canada, and passes within a short driving distance of about 60% of Canada's entire population. It is one of the few locations within Canada that has the population density to support inter-city rail service at a profit, representing 85% of Via's overall ridership, and 70% of its profits. In 2005, it carried 3 million of Via Rail's annual 3.9 million passengers.

The services currently offered by Via were taken over from their former operators, CN Rail and CP Rail, in 1977. These companies became freight-only services the next year when Via started full operation. Via's initially ran almost all of the original CP and CN routes, but over time they eliminated any duplication in service by moving increasingly to the CN lines. As the freight operators owned the lines, Via trains were forced to run behind freight, reducing their on-time performance. In 1987 Via introduced an on-time policy to address the inevitable delays.

== High-speed ==
As the CN lines that Via uses were designed and used primarily for freight services, offering true high-speed support would be difficult. For services at speeds significantly greater than 150 km/h, fencing would have to be installed along the tracks, level crossings removed or greatly improved, additional signals installed or switched to in-cab signalling, and many railroad switches replaced with versions suitable for high-speed service. None of these changes would be a major benefit to CN. Even with full upgrades to the existing lines, scheduling issues would limit the maximum possible performance along the Corridor, as Via services ran behind freight.

Faced with this daunting infrastructure problem, both CN and Via opted to improve performance using "medium-speed" services using tilting trains. The first of these was CN's introduction of the UAC TurboTrain in the late 1960s, which featured a passive tilt system adapted from the Spanish Talgo designs. Via inherited the Turbo, but soon after replaced them with the LRC of similar performance, featuring a locally designed active tilt system. Both sets were capable of relatively high speeds, around 125 mph (200 km/h), but limitations due to track quality, signalling and scheduling limited speeds to 100 mph (160 km/h) or less.

Nevertheless, there have been number of studies, including several major ones, that examined the process of adding a true high-speed route. In total there have been 13 studies into various high-speed services. Many of these have been carried out at a provincial level, not federal. The largest study effort started in 1989 at the request of Ontario Premier David Peterson and Quebec Premier Robert Bourassa. They formed the “Ontario/Québec Rapid Train Task Force” who published their Final Report in 1991, and continued studies that concluded in 1995. These studies supported the construction of entirely new high-speed lines that would provide services up to 400 km/h in the case of maglev, although they suggested this technology was not yet mature and primarily looked at 300 km/h electric sets. However, none of these proposals ever gained the federal funding needed to start construction.

== ViaFast ==
As one proposal after another for high-speed service failed to move forward, Via was left on the same routes with a fleet of aging equipment. In December 2000 the company announced the purchase of a fleet of new coaches originally designed for the aborted European Nightstar service, and started plans to replace the LRC with a fleet of newly built P42DC's that started to arrive in late 2001.

At the same time, Via also returned to the concept of "faster service" along the Corridor for their ViaFast proposal. Announced in 2002 by Federal Transport Minister David Collenette, ViaFast would improve service times primarily through the combination of new signaling and portions of new line that would avoid bottlenecks in the existing network, especially around Kingston. In particular, they suggested that a new line to Ottawa be laid to bypass downtown Kingston, several new sections between Ottawa and Montreal, and a new line from Montréal-Pierre Elliott Trudeau International Airport to the downtown Montreal area.

A new locomotive was required to take full advantage of the improved performance possible on these stretches of new railbed. ViaFast proposed using the Bombardier JetTrain, capable of speeds up to 240 km, although several other designs were also suitable. Toronto-Montreal traffic would be routed along the Ottawa line; this added only a dozen kilometers to the trip, an added distance the higher speed along these new lines would more than make up for. Express Toronto-Montreal services would not stop in Ottawa.

Details of the ViaFast plan did not become publicly available until a "strictly confidential" Via Rail internal report was leaked to the Canwest news service in 2009. The report outlined the new routes and trains and the resulting timetables: Toronto to Ottawa in 2 hours and 15 minutes, Ottawa to Montreal in 1 hour and 15 minutes, Montreal-Quebec City in 2 hours, and Windsor-Toronto in 3 hours and 20 minutes. The report also estimated the price of the project at $2.6 billion, over five years, although the report noted this would result in a reduction of Via's costs by $125 million a year once the system was in place.

Other benefits outlined in the report included the creation of 40,000 jobs during construction and 1,700 jobs during operation, a reduction in traffic on Highway 401/Autoroute 20 equivalent to 1 million cars, and a corresponding reduction of up to $200 million as a result of reduced road maintenance. Canada's annual fuel consumption would be reduced by 262 million litres which would eliminate 824,000 tonnes of greenhouse gasses per year. The original report that these numbers were drawn from has subsequently appeared on the internet.

High Speed Rail Canada, a citizen's group dedicated to educating Canadian's about high-speed rail fought for over a decade to get an unredacted copy of the VIAFast study. It is available as a free download on their website.

== Introduction and disappearance ==
Initial funding for ViaFast was provided on 24 October 2003 when Collenette announced the new $700 million "Renaissance II" infrastructure program, stating that Renaissance II "will provide for faster, more frequent and more reliable passenger service across Canada and will preserve the option for higher speed rail, such as the Via Fast proposal, at a later date."

Signs of trouble for both Renaissance II and the ViaFast proposal appeared immediately. Even before the announcement, liberal member Stan Keyes complained that Collenette hasn't provided enough information on ViaFast; talking to the CBC he asked "What is higher-speed rail system? What is Via Fast? We as a committee, members of Parliament, have never seen this proposal. We don't know what it contains, what its demands are." Shortly after the announcement, Joe Comuzzi, chair of the House of Commons Transportation Committee, stated that Prime Minister Jean Chrétien should not be committing to large funding expenditures as he neared retirement.

Renaissance II was announced during the height of animosity between Jean Chrétien and Paul Martin, who frequently clashed in private and often spilled over into the public eye. During the summer of 2002, Martin toured the country drumming up support for a leadership challenge in January 2003, which Chrétien survived. However the battles continued, and that fall Chrétien announced that he would retire in the spring of 2004 unless he had a clear commitment from the party to stay on, which was not forthcoming. On 21 September 2003 Martin won a landslide in the resulting leadership race, but this did not stop the very public infighting that continued through 2004.

Martin, a fiscal conservative who was named to the World Economic Forum's "dream cabinet" in 2001, cancelled many capital spending projects, Renaissance II among them.

== Aftermath ==
With the fall of Martin's government after a motion of no confidence and their loss in the subsequent 2006 federal election, Via's fate was passed to Stephen Harper's Conservatives. In 2007 Transport Minister Lawrence Cannon and Finance Minister Jim Flaherty announced that Via would receive $691.9 million in capital funding over five years, much of this earmarked for capital acquisitions, refurbishing locomotives and passenger cars, and day-to-day operations.

In January 2008, Ontario Premier Dalton McGuinty and Quebec Premier Jean Charest announced that they would start their own study of high-speed service in the Corridor. Quoting the study from 1995, Charest noted that the estimated $18 billion would cost about $23 billion given the inflation during the intervening period. The two premiers stated they would spend $2 million on a new study to bring the proposal up to date. "We think it's time to conduct our own study that takes into account some of the new realities," McGuinty said.

Part of the federal January 2009 budget included $407 million for rail upgrades, some of which was earmarked for a new track expansion in the Kingston area to allow trains to overtake each other and eliminate bottlenecks. The upgrades would reduce average Toronto-Montreal time by about 30 minutes, allowing the addition of two daily trains. After seeing the budget, McGuinty publicly complained that "I continue to be a big fan of [the plan], as does Jean Charest. The prime minister is not as much of a fan on this score."
