= JetTrain =

Experimental high-speed passenger trainset

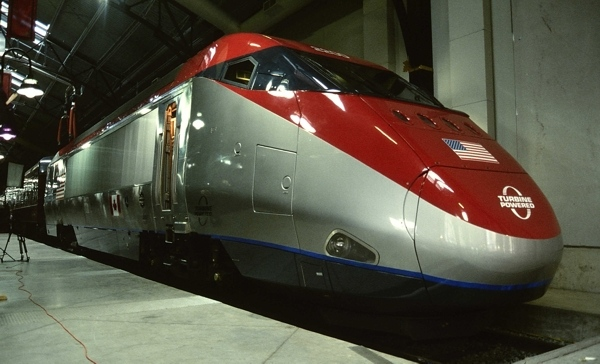
Type and origin
- Power type: Gas-turbine–electric
- Builder: Bombardier Transportation
- Build date: 2000
- Total produced: 1 (prototype)
Specifications
- Gauge: 4 ft 8 1/2 in (1,435 mm)
- Loco weight: 215,000 lb (98,000 kg)
- Fuel type: Diesel
- Prime mover: Pratt & Whitney Canada ST40
Performance figures
- Maximum speed: 165 mph (266 km/h)
- Power output: 5,029 shp (3,750 kW)

The JetTrain was an experimental high-speed passenger train concept created by Bombardier Transportation in an attempt to make European-style high-speed service more financially appealing to passenger railways throughout North America. It was designed to use the same LRC-derived tilting car Acela trains that Bombardier built for Amtrak in the 1990s, which used all-electric locomotives. Unlike the Acela, powered electrically by overhead lines, the JetTrain would have used a combination of a 4,000-horsepower (3.0 MW) gas-turbine engine, a low-power diesel engine, a reduction gearbox, and two alternators to power electric traction motors. This would have allowed it to run at high speeds on non-electrified lines.

== Description ==
=== Gas turbine engines ===
Turbine engines use as much as 65% of their overall generated power to run the compressor at the front of the engine. This means that when the engine is set to idle, with no net energy output, the engine is still burning 65% of the fuel it would at full speed. This makes turbine engines attractive only in roles where they are run at high power settings for long periods of time, as is the case in aircraft, power generation, or long-range train service. They are generally unattractive in roles where low-power operation is common, which is why they have also been unsuccessful in automobiles.

When jet fuel was very inexpensive in the 1950s and 1960s the mechanical advantages of the engine – its inherent simplicity and very light weight – made up for the increased fuel costs. Several turbine-powered low-speed train designs were introduced during the 1950s and 1960s, including both passenger and cargo engines. A number of high-speed passenger trainsets were also being designed in the 1960s, including the UAC TurboTrain in North America, the British Advanced Passenger Train (APT) and the French TGV 001.

By the 1970s, especially after the 1973 oil crisis, these advantages were no longer enough to overcome the increased fuel costs, and most turbine-based train designs disappeared. While two large classes of gas-turbine powered intercity railcars (ETG and RTG) continued to be used in France up until about 2000, both the TGV and APT switched to all-electric operation, with the installation of overhead lines to support them. In North America, where funding to upgrade rail lines was limited, electric operation was only an option for the busiest routes, and remains rare. Canadian National Railway (CN) and Via Rail continued to run their TurboTrains into the early 1980s, before they too were replaced with diesel–electric units, such as the LRC train. Amtrak continued to run Rohr Turboliners until about 2003.

=== JetTrain ===
Another change that has taken place over the last few decades is the widespread use and standardization of head end power (HEP) to provide electricity to the rest of the train for running the environmental controls and entertainment systems. Since these power requirements are fairly steady, even while the train is parked, it is not uncommon to use a separate engine just for this role, highly tuned to these operational needs.

The JetTrain concept expands on this idea by using the same HEP engine to provide motive power during low-speed operation, bypassing the problems with turbine fuel efficiency at low power settings. The JetTrain concept uses only this engine while it is moving about the station area and switchyards. Once the train has left the switchyard, the turbine engine, a 3,750 kW (5,029 shp) Pratt & Whitney Canada PW150 (called the ST40 in this role), is started and the train accelerates to operational speed. The turbine engine is adapted from helicopter service, having the benefit of over 50 years of development in that service to improve its operational efficiency and reliability. It is adapted to operate on regular locomotive diesel fuel so that no special fueling facilities need to be built to introduce the turbine locomotives on existing railroad lines. The diesel engine alone can run the train at speeds up to 50 km/h (31 mph) when empty, and the turbine increases that to 240 km/h (149 mph). The two engines are geared together in a single gearbox which powers a generator to provide power to four traction motors, identical to those in the all-electric Acela Express. The generator is the motor from a TGV train, run in reverse of normal operation where instead of being hooked to electric power and producing rotation, it is rotated and produces electric power.

The major advantage to using the turbine for the high-speed portion is its small physical size and light weight. The turbine engine is about the size of a common office desk and weighs only 400 kg (882 lb), while a conventional diesel motor of the same power is about 5 m (16 ft) long and weighs as much as 10,000 kg (22,046 lb). Using the turbine lowers the weight of the power cars; the JetTrain power car is 215,000 pounds (97.5 t) and had an unsprung weight per axle of 5,530 pounds (2,508 kg). This compares to the widely used EMD F40PH which weighs 260,000 lb (117.9 t) with an axle weight of 8,540 lb (3.9 t). This reduction in mass per axle places considerably less stress on the rails, allowing the train to operate at higher speeds without changes to the railbed.

With a single power car towing seven passenger cars, the JetTrain could reach 170 km/h (106 mph), although its maximum "balance speed" was 220 km/h (137 mph). With two power cars, one at the front and one at the rear, the train could reach 240 km/h (149 mph), with a maximum speed of 265 km/h (165 mph). A complete train would normally consist of two power cars, one at either end, along with up to 11 passenger cars. The tilting passenger cars are versions of the ones used on the Acela, tracing their lineage to Bombardier's LRC tilting train introduced in the 1980s. In high speed passenger service, the JetTrain would be highly efficient. Due to its lighter weight and modern engine, the JetTrain has greenhouse gas emissions that are 30% lower than a diesel unit operating at the same speeds. The engine is practically silent even at full power: in operation the train is the same volume as the all-electric Acela.

== History ==
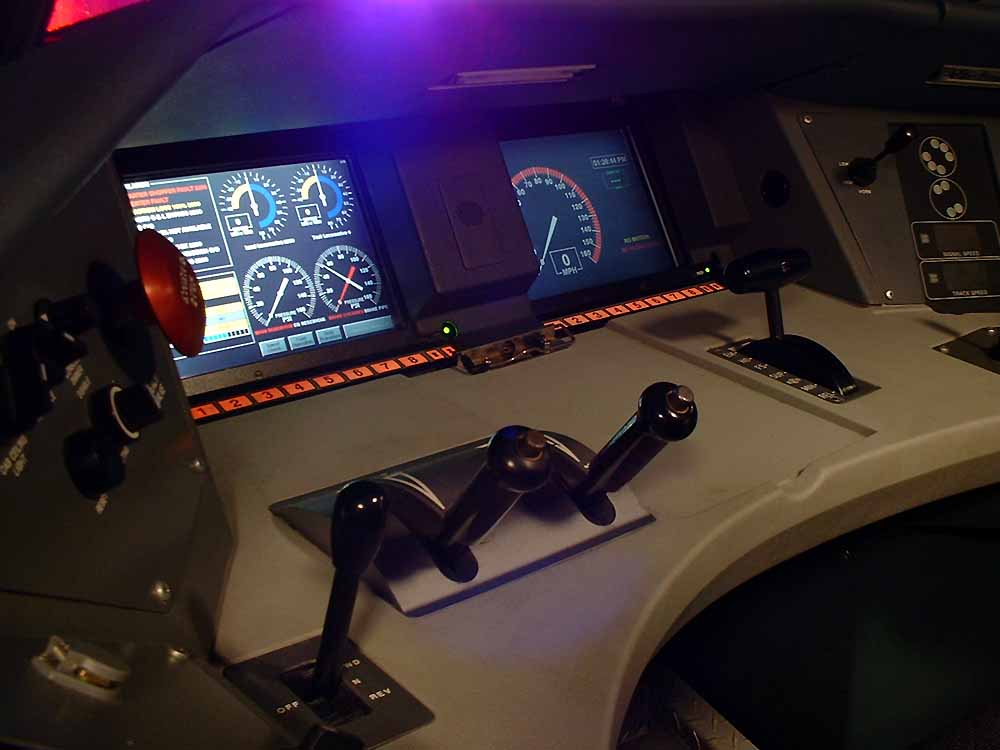
Controls of the JetTrain

The JetTrain originated in 1997 in the Federal Railroad Administration's (FRA) Next Generation High Speed Rail Program to develop high speed train technologies for services on routes outside the Northeast Corridor—where route volumes might not be great enough to make electrification an option. The FRA sought an industrial partner who would be willing to invest on a 50/50 basis, and FRA spokesman Warren Flatau commented, "Bombardier is the company that stepped up to the plate when we put out the word we were interested in doing this project. We believe that the project holds great potential for bringing about the high speed services that people across the country are expressing a desire for". The final agreement was signed in October 1998, with the FRA and Bombardier each investing $13 million in the first prototype locomotive, which was built at the new Bombardier Mass Transit Corporation plant in Plattsburgh, New York.

The prototype locomotive was completed in June 2000. It included the turbine propulsion system but did not implement the low-speed diesel motor approach. Safety testing started at the Transportation Technology Center (Pueblo, Colorado) in the summer of 2001, where it reached a maximum speed of 156 miles per hour (251 km/h). The prototype was then taken on a tour of potential high speed sites. Their primary target was the Florida Overland Express for passenger service between Orlando and Tampa in the United States. In support of this program, the prototype visited Miami on 7 October 2003 and Orlando on the 11 October. The Florida system was originally slated to open in 2009, but was denied funding by a referendum in 2004, after the start of detail engineering stages.

In Canada, Bombardier and Via Rail presented a proposal to use JetTrains on Via’s busy Quebec City-Windsor Corridor as part of their ViaFast proposal, but were unable to obtain funding from the national government. In January 2008, the premiers of Ontario and Quebec announced a feasibility study for the Corridor, giving high speed trains another chance. The Van Horne Institute also completed a study with Bombardier regarding the suitability of JetTrain service between the two largest cities in Alberta, Edmonton and Calgary. Other possibilities included new lines in Texas and to Las Vegas.

In the United Kingdom, the JetTrain has been proposed as a replacement for the 125 miles per hour (201 km/h) diesel–electric HST. Australian rail magazines have suggested the JetTrain as a viable option for high-speed rail in Australia to supplement the XPT (a version of the British HST) and Tilt Train.

Bombardier had conversations with the state government of Yucatan, Mexico, for the development of the Transpeninsular Fast Train, a project that aims to connect the state capital of Mérida to the tourist resorts of the Mayan Riviera like Cancún and the Mayan Ruins of Chichen Itza. According to the Governor Ivonne Ortega, the train must run on diesel at an average speed of 100 miles per hour (160 km/h), for which Bombardier deemed suitable the use of The JetTrain.

In the end, nothing ever came of any of these proposals, and all content related to the JetTrain were eventually removed from Bombardier's web sites and promotional materials. As of 2019, the demonstration turbine locomotive was stored at the Transportation Technology Center.

== See also ==
- Gas-turbine locomotive (Turbine electric, Turbine–electric powertrain)
- LRC (train)
- Turboliner
- UAC TurboTrain
- Acela Express (trainset)
- TGV 001

== Bibliography ==
- "Bombardier Unveils JetTrain Technology", Bombardier press release, 15 October 2002
- Epstein, Edward (16 October 2002). "JetTrain proposed for state railroad / Would travel from S.F. to L.A. in 2 1/2 hours". SFGATE.
- ["Bombardier JetTrain Rolls Into Florida"], Business Wire, 7 October 2003
- "JetTrain Locomotive Rolls Into Orlando: Inaugural Visit to Florida by the High-Speed Rail Locomotive", Marketwire, 11 October 2003
- "Quebec - Windsor Corridor Jet Train, Canada"
- ["JetTrain Technology"], older Canadair page
