= LRC (train) =

Class of Canadian passenger rolling stock

LRC-2 and LRC-3 locomotives
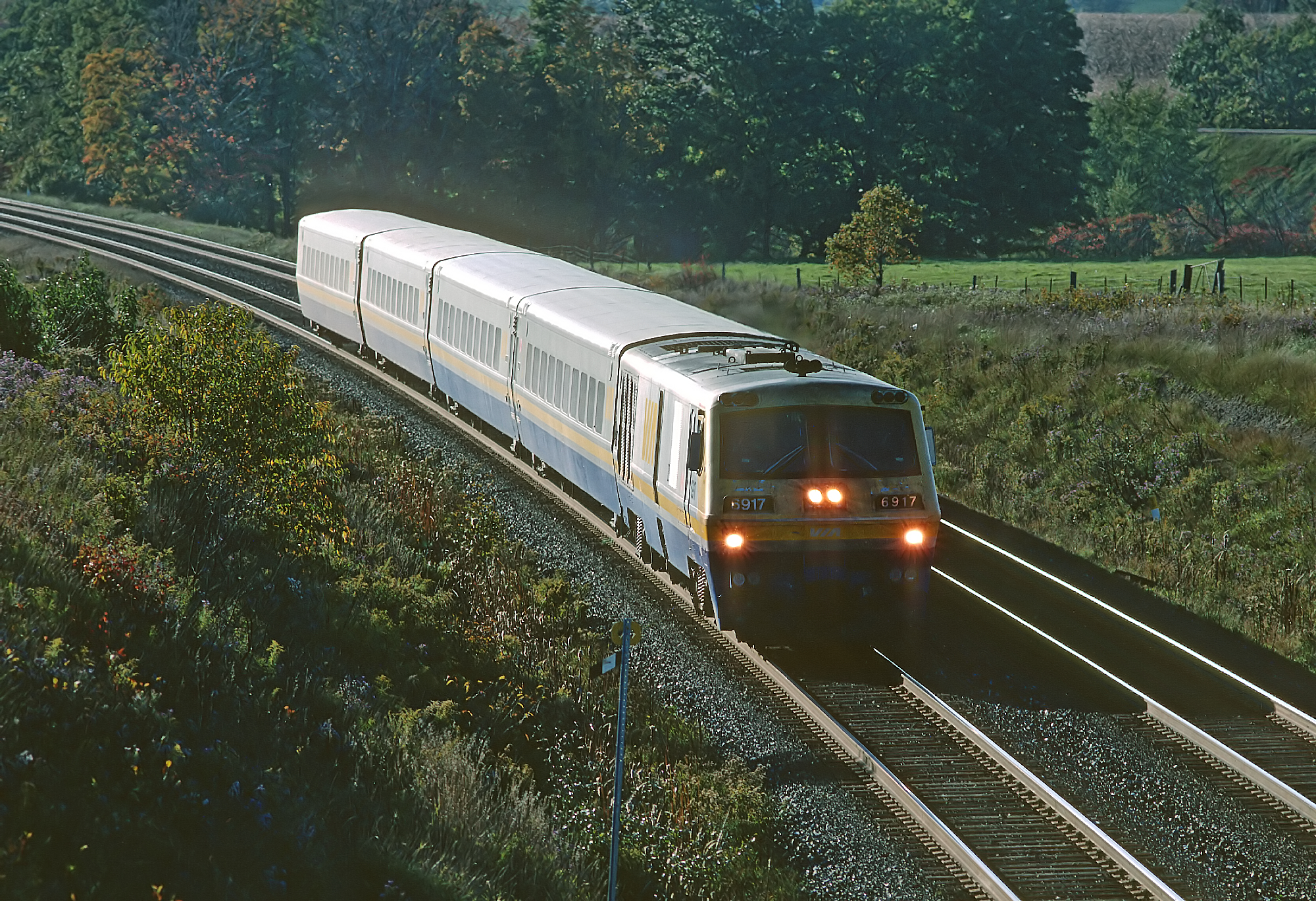
- LRC No. 6917 at Newtonville, Ontario
Type and origin
- Power type: Diesel–electric
- Builder: Bombardier Transportation
- Order number: M6109, M6125
- Serial number: M6109-01 to M6109-21, M6125-01 to M6125-10
- Build date: 1980–1984
- Total produced: LRC-2: 21, LRC-3: 10
Specifications
- Configuration
  - AAR: B-B
  - UIC: Bo′Bo′
- Gauge: 4 ft 8 1/2 in (1,435 mm) standard gauge
- Minimum curve: 23 Degrees
- Length: 63 ft 8 in (19.41 m)
- Width: 10 ft 5 5/8 in (3.19 m)
- Height: 12 ft 9 1/4 in (3.89 m)
- Loco weight: 250,000–256,000 lb (113,000–116,000 kg)
- Fuel type: Diesel fuel
- Fuel capacity: 1,665 US gallons (6,300 L)
- Lubricant cap.: 281 US gallons (1,060 L)
- Coolant cap.: 331 US gallons (1,250 L)
- Sandbox cap.: 22 cubic feet (620 L)
- Prime mover: ALCO designed 16-251F; Built by MLW / BT in Montreal
- RPM range: 350-1,025 rpm
- Engine type: Four-stroke diesel
- Aspiration: Turbocharged
- Alternator: GTA-17PF2 (traction), GY-68PA1 (aux), 2 Stamford C534B (HEP)
- Generator: GE 581
- Traction motors: GE 752 (4)
- Cylinders: 16
- Cylinder size: 9 in × 10.5 in (230 mm × 270 mm)
- Transmission: Diesel–electric
- MU working: Yes
- Train heating: HEP 480 Volt 60 Hertz AC
- Loco brake: Air, Dynamic
- Train brakes: Air
- Couplers: Type H (APTA)
Performance figures
- Maximum speed: 95 mph (153 km/h)
- Power output: 3,700–2,700 hp (2.76–2.01 MW) for traction, remainder for locomotive auxiliaries and HEP
Career
- Operators: Via Rail, Amtrak
- Numbers: VIA 6900–6920 (LRC-2), 6921–6930 (LRC-3), Amtrak 38-39
- Locale: North America
- Delivered: June 1st, 1981
- Retired: 2001
- Preserved: Via 6917 and Via 6921 (both in operating condition)
- Restored: Via 6917: May 2014
- Current owner: Via 6917: Toronto Railway Historical Society, VIA 6921: Exporail
- Disposition: Most scrapped, two preserved, some for sale

The LRC (a bilingual initialism: in English: Light, Rapid, Comfortable; in French: Léger, Rapide, et Confortable) is a series of lightweight diesel-powered passenger trains that were used on short- to medium-distance inter-city service in the Canadian Provinces of Ontario and Quebec.

LRC was designed to run with locomotives, or power cars, at both ends and provide 125 mph (201 km/h) service on non-upgraded railway routes. To accomplish this, the LRC passenger cars feature active-tilt technology to reduce the forces on the passengers when a train travels at high speeds through curves. LRCs have reached speeds as high as 130 mph (210 km/h) on test runs.

On its only regular service route, on the Quebec City–Windsor Corridor, where concerns, signalling issues and conflicts with slower-moving freight trains limit this to 100 mph (160 km/h) or less. For service at these speeds, a single power car was used. Special signage allowed the LRC to run at higher speeds than normal traffic across a great portion of the Corridor when the tilt system was enabled.

The LRC locomotives and passenger cars are compatible with conventional equipment, and the same basic car forms the basis of the Acela in the U.S. The last LRC locomotive was removed from service on 12 December 2001. The passenger cars (with the tilt system disabled) are still in widespread use on Via Rail's Corridor service, but are being retired and replaced by Siemens Venture coaches.

== History ==
=== Problems with speed ===
As a vehicle turns it generates centrifugal force, which is proportional to the square of the speed and inversely proportional to the radius. Even a small amount of force, acting across the length of the human body, creates a moment that can make moving about difficult. Centrifugal forces are not normally an issue in an automobile because the occupants are seated, nor in an aircraft where the fuselage is tilted so the centrifugal force passes through the line of the floor. It is primarily a problem in high-speed trains, where passengers and attendants often walk about while the train is moving. The force also pushes the entire train sideways, leading to wear of the outer rail. This was not an issue on early railways where the speed was low, but gained importance as line speeds increased and the radius of curvature became tighter.

One solution is to place speed restrictions on curved sections of track; another is to bank the railbed on the curve, with the outer rail higher than the inner rail so the net force passes straight through the floor of the coach. Banking the track is known as "cant" or superelevation. These measures were gradually adopted on the railways between 1835 and 1860. The use of track cant can only be applied where the speed of the train is fixed in advance. Slower, or stationary, traffic sharing the same line will experience forces pulling inwards, and, conversely, faster traffic will still experience forces pulling outwards. Long experience has shown that, to avoid discomfort on slower trains, track cant should not exceed 6°; and, for trains moving more quickly, cant deficiency should not exceed 4.5°.

Dedicated high-speed railway lines were being constructed in Japan in the 1960s. Japan had previously used a 3 ft 6 in (1,067 mm) but decided to lay entirely new standard gauge lines for these services, the Shinkansen. The lines were designed for a running speed of 210 km/h (130 mph), using gentle curves with minimum radii of 2.5 km (1.6 mi), and entirely new signalling systems able to provide enough warning to stop a train at 193 km/h (120 mph) within 5.3 km (3.3 mi). The Europeans were planning similar systems in several countries, while the UK, and Canada, could not justify such an expense given their passenger numbers.

=== Active tilt ===
Another solution to this problem had been developed in the 1950s but not widely used: tilting trains. Tilting trains rock into the curve to tilt the passenger cars the same way that a superelevated track would tilt them inward. Tilting systems had been introduced in service by the Spanish Talgo, but this system was "passive" and took some time to respond to curves. Great improvement can be made by making the system "active", reading the forces on the cars with sensors and quickly rotating them to the proper angle using hydraulic rams. British Rail ran an extensive experimental program on active tilt systems in the 1960s that was highly influential, and followed these studies in the 1970s with a new tilting train design, the Advanced Passenger Train (APT). The technical design objectives for the APT included a maximum speed 50% higher than existing trains and curving speeds 40% higher, all while running on existing tracks within the limits of existing signals.

While tilting reduces the problem for the passengers, it does not change the forces on the rails. A train going around a bend at high speed rides up onto the rails, and if the flanges on the inside of the wheels contact the rails they cause considerable wear. Eliminating this effect is difficult, but it can be reduced by lowering the weight of the locomotive, or eliminating the locomotive and distributing the motive power throughout the train. APT took the former route, and the original APT-E used gas turbine power. Gas turbines have an excellent power-to-weight ratio, perhaps ten times that of a conventional diesel engine, with the downside that they use considerably more fuel at idle. This was not a concern when the APT was first being designed, but after the 1973 oil crisis they quickly changed the design to be electrically powered. This was even lighter than the turbine version, but requiring the lines to be electrified at great cost. As a result, only the West Coast Main Line from London to Glasgow used the electrically powered APT-Ps.

==== Turbo ====
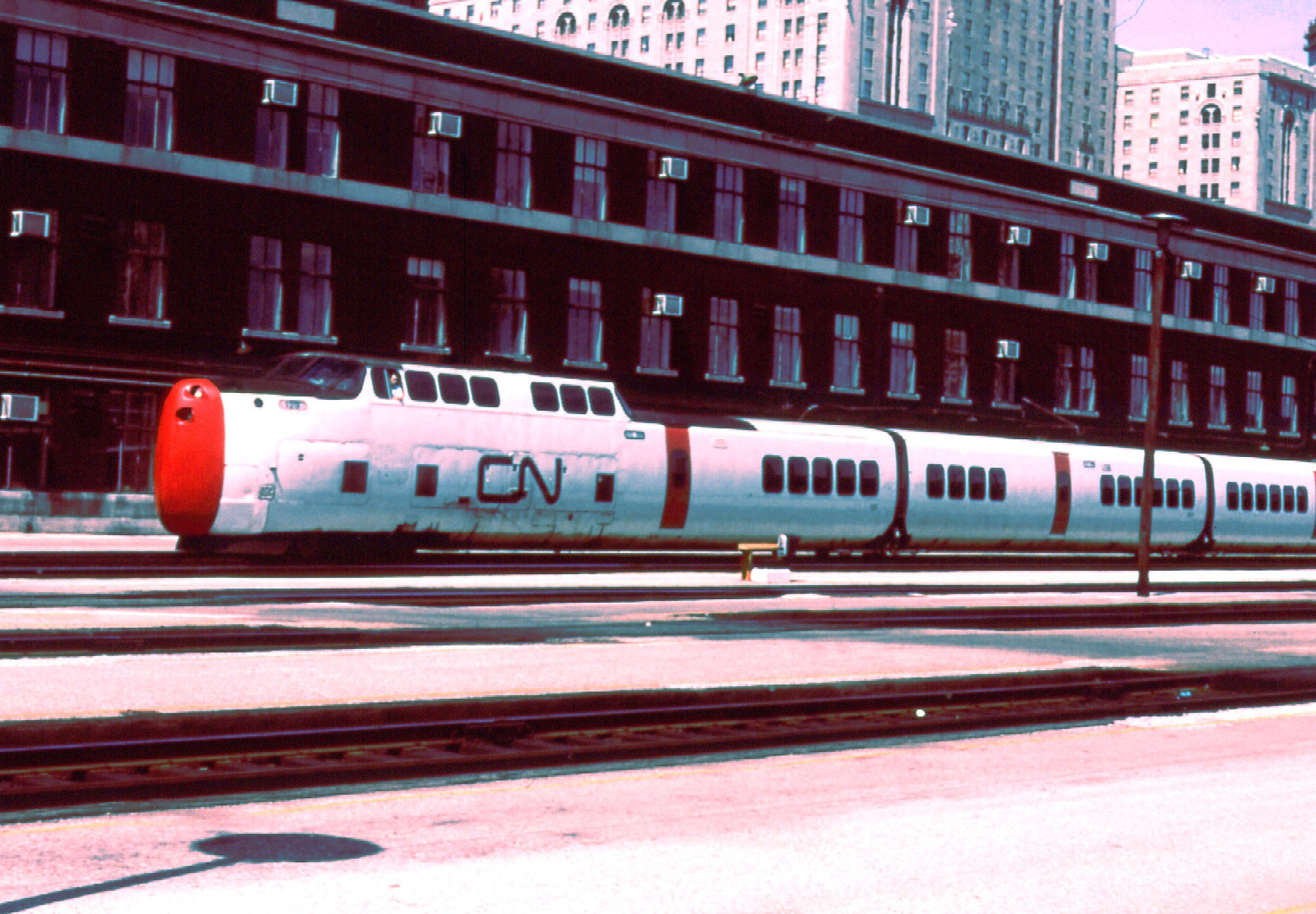
CN Turbo in Toronto in 1975

The only route with passenger numbers and trip times suitable for high-speed service in Canada at the time was the Quebec City–Windsor Corridor, especially the 335-mile (539 km) portion between Toronto and Montreal that accounts for two-thirds of the passengers in the Corridor.

The TurboTrain, or simply "Turbo" as CN preferred, was CN's first attempt to provide higher speeds along the Corridor. Designed in the early 1960s by United Aircraft Corp., the TurboTrain used a licensed version of Talgo's passive tilt system and a new turbine-powered locomotive. The CN trainsets were built in Canada by a consortium of Dofasco for the bogies and suspension system, Alcan for the car bodies, and Montreal Locomotive Works (MLW) for the engines and power systems. All three companies gained valuable experience with modern passenger train design as a result of the project.

The Turbo was far from perfect, however. Its articulated bogies meant that the train could only be uncoupled in the maintenance yards. If there was a problem with a single car the entire train had to be taken out of service, and the inability to easily change train length significantly reduced its flexibility. The design featured unique doors at either end to allow two trains to be coupled into one longer one, but in practice this proved too much trouble to be worth it. Moreover, while the turbine power was lightweight and proved very reliable, it was also very inefficient in fuel terms.

==== LRC ====
A competitor to the Turbo had been brewing for some time at this point. As early as 1966 an engineer in Alcan had been formulating ideas for a new lightweight train and introduced the design to CN. The car body design was made mostly of aluminum for light weight, and built two inches lower than conventional sets to cut down wind resistance. The entire underside and running gear were also streamlined and tight-fitting from car to car to reduce the inter-car gap and the drag that causes. Active tilt in the cars would allow them to take advantage of higher speeds on existing lines, and an advanced suspension design would offer a smooth ride at all speeds.

The locomotive was based on the ALCO 16-251F prime mover rated at 3,750 bhp (2,800 kW) at 1050 rpm. This was the only suitable engine already being built at MLW; it was a relatively old design from the 1950s, and the LRC would prove to be one of its last uses in North America. To keep the train as a whole as streamlined as possible, the loco body was wrapped very tightly around the engine, at the same height as the cars. The resulting design was quite small even by modern standards, several feet shorter than the GE Genesis that replaced them in Via service, and thousands of pounds lighter. The light weight and low wind resistance would allow higher speeds while using less power, improving fuel efficiency.

Despite the older engine design, the LRC was a great advance in the state of the art over the Turbo in every way, offering a smoother ride at the same or faster speeds, with lower capital and operational costs, and the ability to easily change train lengths. In January 1967, the two companies approached Dofasco and MLW about the possibility of a new joint venture to develop the design. In December, the group presented their design to Transport Canada, and in January another presentation was made to the Department of International Trade and Commerce to gain funding. The Canadian government's Transportation Development Centre (TDC) outside of Montreal agreed to provide development funding for the technology under the Program for the Advancement of Industrial Technology (PAIT).

The effort found strong support within the government. The Canadian Transport Commission studied the problem of offering Corridor service and concluded that "the most profitable strategy to adopt involves maximizing the potential of existing railway facilities through the introduction of new vehicle technology."

==== Designing the suspension ====
The first consideration was whether or not a suitable tilting mechanism could be built into the bogies that would not require extra space or project into the car. Dofasco, a major steel manufacturer in Hamilton, won the majority of the bogie development contracts. They developed a system that consisted of two parts, a bogie and suspension on the bottom, and a separate tilting mechanism on top.

The suspension consisted of several parts. Between the axle and the bogie frame was a series of C-shaped steel leaf springs stacked inside each other for the basic suspension, with rubber sheets between the leaves providing some shock absorption. A second set of softer springs on top of the bogie provided finer ride quality. Four sets of shock absorbers completed the suspension.

The tilt controls were developed by SPAR Aerospace and Sperry Rand Canada. The car body rode on rollers fitted into two U-shaped arms at the front and back of each bogie. Hydraulic rams moved the car from side to side along these arms, tilting it up to 8.5 degrees. This made the bottom of the coach slide sideways while it rotated, so that the axis of motion was in the middle of the car body, instead of the top (like the Turbo) or bottom (like most tilt systems). This reduced the feeling of motion on the passengers by keeping the rotation close to their center of gravity, and reduced loads to 0.5 g. Each bogie was equipped with an accelerometer and operated as a completely self-contained unit.

=== Prototypes and testing ===
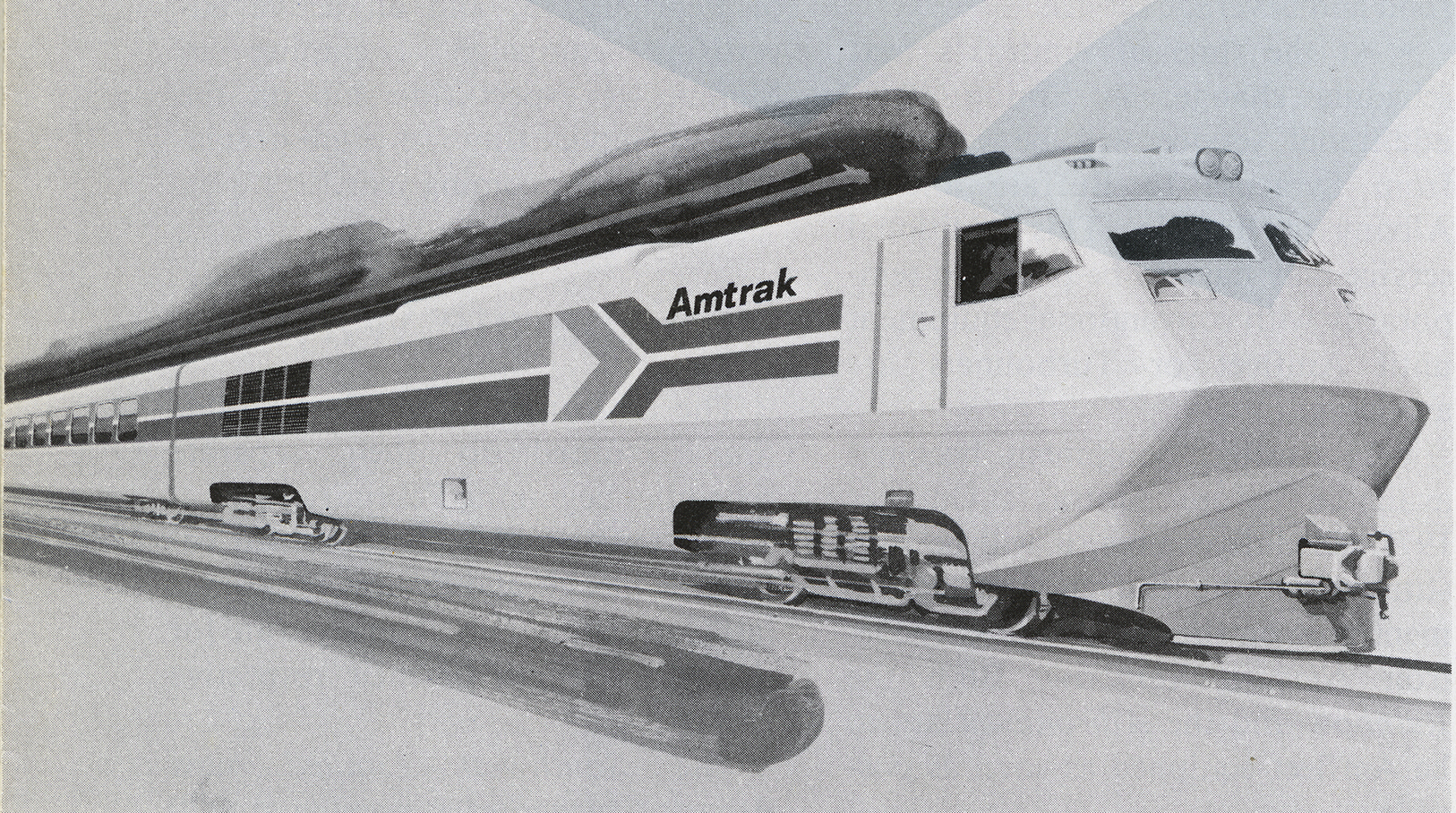
1977 Amtrak LRC Rendering

With Dofasco's successful demonstration of a tilting system, additional contracts were offered to build a prototype train. The name LRC was carefully selected to define the project's goals bilingually: a lightweight train, operating at high speeds, and providing a more comfortable ride than existing trains. Alcan of Montreal won the contract for the aluminum passenger cars and the carbody of the locomotive, while MLW developed the new diesel–electric system.

The companies had predicted that the development of the prototype would cost $2.48 million, and the government provided half of that under the PAIT agreements. The project overran the budget by $77,000, which the companies supplied out-of-pocket. The prototype coach was completed in 1971 and started testing with conventional locomotives. By the summer of 1972, it had seen 5,000 mi (8,000 km) of service, and a few relatively minor problems cropped up. Issues with the tilting mechanism were studied by a group at SPAR and McMaster University, and several fixes incorporated into the design. By that point the prototype locomotive was 85% complete.

During this period, CN executives started expressing concerns about the cost of the equipment, while their engineers stated a preference for electrically powered tilting in place of the hydraulic system. Dofasco stated that such a change would be impractical, upsetting CN. In response, CN requested a series of additional tests, delaying their decision on ordering the design. This was also likely a response to the problems encountered on the Turbo, which had been rushed into service for Expo '67 before rigorous testing had worked out its problems.

With the PAIT funds exhausted in 1972 and the launch customer delaying its orders, the project went into a lengthy hiatus period where little progress was made. To continue testing without an order from CN, the consortium was forced to turn to the TDC for additional funds. It was not until July 1973 that an additional $460,000 was released to finish the locomotive and start testing. A four-phase program was envisioned to bring the LRC to production. The first two phases would have the coach running on normal mainline service through April 1973 as part of Phase 1 and runs at higher speeds in Phase 2 through to July 1974.

Testing was further delayed due to a railway strike in Canada, which led the consortium to explore moving the high-speed tests to the U.S.'s High Speed Ground Test Center in Pueblo, Colorado. Although a deal was arranged in January 1974, testing continued in Canada. Later that year the consortium learned that the U.S. was considering foreign designs for service with Amtrak, so the contract was revived and the LRC prototype was sent for a six-week period starting in November 1974. The tracks it ran on included butted and welded rail, concrete and wooden ties, and was originally designed to test low-speed urban transport designs at speeds up to 80 mph (130 km/h). During the testing the train covered 35,000 km (22,000 mi) at speeds of up to 200 km/h (120 mph), and routinely took corners designed for 65 mph (105 km/h) at 105 mph (169 km/h). In one all-day test it averaged 98.6 mph (158.7 km/h) including three 10‑minute stops to change crews. The testing was considered a great success by everyone involved, although Amtrak eventually purchased locally made versions of the Turboliner.

With Phase 1 and 2 complete, additional funding was provided in 1975 to complete the last two phases. Phase 3 started with the LRC entering service on the Toronto-Sarnia portion of the Corridor, replacing the existing Tempos, running on the Tempo's existing schedules and lower speeds. The locomotive ran for another 100,000 km (62,100 mi) in these tests, and the coach 80,000 km (49,700 mi). Simultaneously the last phase, Phase 4, had to demonstrate high speeds on Canadian rails, not test sites. On 12 March 1976 on a stretch of CN line outside Farnham, Quebec, the prototype reached 208 km/h (129 mph). With those tests successfully completed, the LRC had passed the entire four-phase testing program and was cleared for Canadian service. The total cost for testing, including the funds released in 1973 and 1975, reached $1.1 million. The program as a whole hit $5 million in total.

=== Into production ===
Bombardier purchased MLW in 1975, in part to gain access to the LRC. By this point, it had outstripped the development of the APT in the UK and would enter service before it. Although it had a lower top speed than the APT or Japanese designs, it was otherwise considered very advanced. Fuel economy was particularity noteworthy; the LRC used slightly more than 1 US gallon per mile (240 L/100 km) with a five-car train, whereas existing fleets used just under 2 US gal/mi (470 L/100 km), and the Turbo used 2 to 3 US gal/mi (470 to 710 L/100 km).

The monocoque aluminum coaches were also noteworthy; they weighed 105,000 lb (47.6 t) empty, about one-third less than CN's existing fleet, and were somewhat lighter than the 115,000 lb (52.2 t) Amfleet coaches being introduced at the same time in the U.S. They were built around two aluminum girders running the length of the car, providing them with the high strength needed to meet the more stringent North American crash standards, while still being competitive with similar designs from Europe. They also included heavy soundproofing, including 3 inches (76 mm) of foam insulation throughout the body.

The only major problem with the LRC to come up during development was a continued weight increase of the locomotives. The prototype locomotive weighted 236,000 lb (107 t), about 14,000 lb (6.35 t) less than a conventional low-speed loco. However, while development turned into production the weight grew to 245,000 lb (111 t), eliminating any difference. By 1980, the National Research Council published a report noting that the weight had grown so much that service above 100 mph (160 km/h) would cause unacceptable wear on the Corridor, thereby limiting the new LRC to the same speeds of the Turbo it was meant to replace. Alcan and TDC were also highly critical of Bombardier's management of the MLW portion of the program, suggesting that their mid-level management lacked the know-how to conclude the project rapidly.

=== Service entry ===
While work progressed on the LRC, the Canadian government was in the initial stages of fulfilling an election promise made by Pierre Trudeau in 1974 to implement a nationwide carrier similar to Amtrak in the U.S. Although they agreed in principle to buy the LRC in 1975, purchase of the LRC was put on hold while the newly forming Via Rail was set up. CN, which had been wanting to rid itself of passenger service since the late 1960s, started passing off its existing passenger rolling stock to Via starting in 1976.

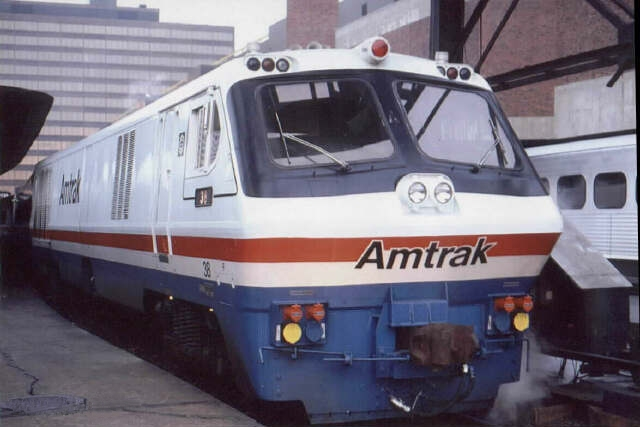
Amtrak locomotive 38, pulling the Beacon Hill service between New Haven and Boston, as seen in December 1980

In the meantime, in January 1977 Amtrak signed a $10 million lease agreement for two locomotives with five coaches each, with an option to buy the trains at any time, or return them after the two years were up. Amtrak was in the process of investigating high-speed service on their own Northeast Corridor, especially between New York City and Boston. This portion of the line contained numerous curves, and they were investigating active tilt for at least this portion of the route. The "LRC 1" batch for Amtrak was completed in the fall of 1980. They ran in revenue service as Amtrak #38 and #39 (locomotives) and #40 to 49 (cars), where they were used on the Beacon Hill (New Haven-Boston) and Shoreliner (New York-Boston) services.

Amtrak declined to take over the trains and they were returned to Bombardier in 1982. There were significant differences between these machines and the later Canadian sets, so they could not be easily mixed. Via used the Amtrak coaches for their International service to Chicago, repainted in Via Rail colours, and renumbered 3501 to 3508, 3511 and 3512. The locos (#38 and #39) were returned to MLW before being scrapped in 1990; the ten coaches are currently parked at Via's headquarters in Montreal. Despite Amtrak not taking up the LRC design, there was some consideration, even at that early date, of an electric locomotive version of the same basic design.

By 1978, Via was up and running and they formalized their first order for 10 LRC locomotives and 50 coaches (numbered 3300 to 3349). The total price for the project to this point was $90 million, less than the APT project in the U.K., and less than the successful Metroliner project in the U.S. (after being adjusted for inflation). This order was then expanded for another 10 locomotives. This batch of 20 became the "LRC 2" (loco numbers 6900 to 6920). In 1981, they placed another order for 10 locomotives (6921 to 6930) and another 50 coaches (3350 to 3399), the "LRC 3" batch.

=== In service ===
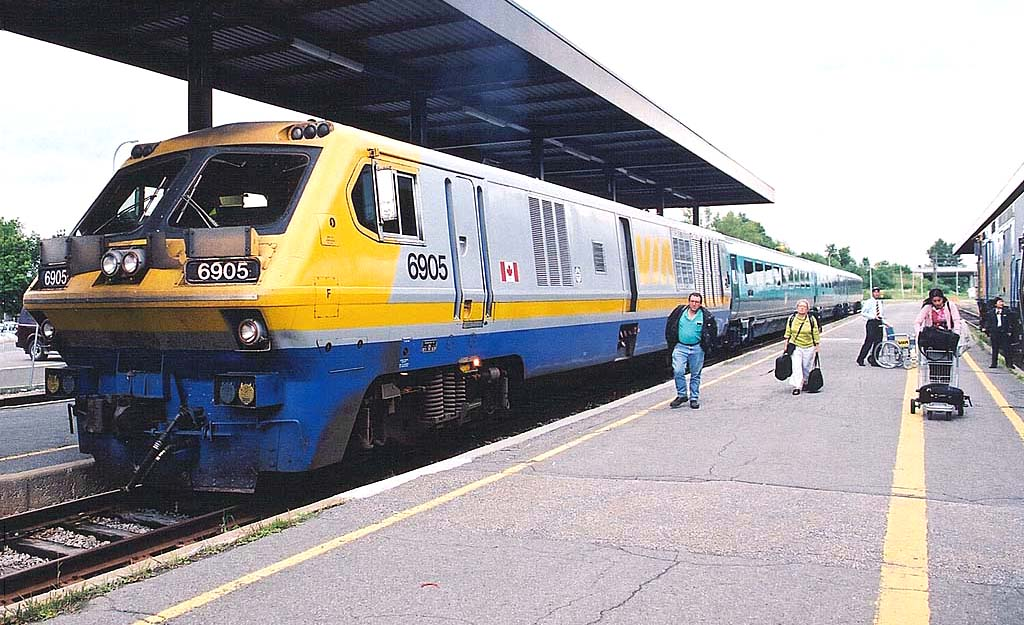
LRC#6905 at Ottawa, Ontario during the initial Nightstar test runs, in the summer of 2000. This was one of the last runs of the LRC locomotives.

The first Canadian production set was delivered to Montreal's Windsor Station on 1 June 1981. The first fare-paying run was made from Toronto to Sarnia on 4 September 1981, on Labour Day weekend. Initially, the LRCs were plagued with problems. One common problem was that the cars would "lock" in the tilted position even after the track had straightened out from a curve.

At the time, Bombardier was estimating total sales of another 80 LRC sets, for up to $500 million. Their calculations showed that the LRC would have a cost per passenger of $23.26 over a 335-mile (539 km) trip, only slightly higher than conventional trains. Although the LRC used much less fuel per passenger than conventional sets, even less than a bus, no further sales were forthcoming.

Via Rail put the trains into service, persisting through their initial teething pains and coming to depend on the LRC for the majority of its intercity service in the Quebec City–Windsor Corridor. The original LRC locomotives were gradually retired after ten to fifteen years of service, although #6905 was used during test runs of the new "Renaissance" cars between Glen Robertson and Ottawa in 2000. The last run of an LRC locomotive was in 2001.

== Retirement and dispositions ==
After being retired, some of the LRC locomotives were sold to Industrial Rail Services of Moncton, New Brunswick, one of them, LRC #6008 which had been decommissioned since 1987, was sold to Canadian Allied Diesel Railway Services (CAD) on May 11, 1999 and renumbered to CAD 2000.

Some were scrapped and others awaiting sale to museums or operators. Currently, only two known examples have survived into preservation.

== LRC cars ==
LRC-2 and LRC-3 passenger car
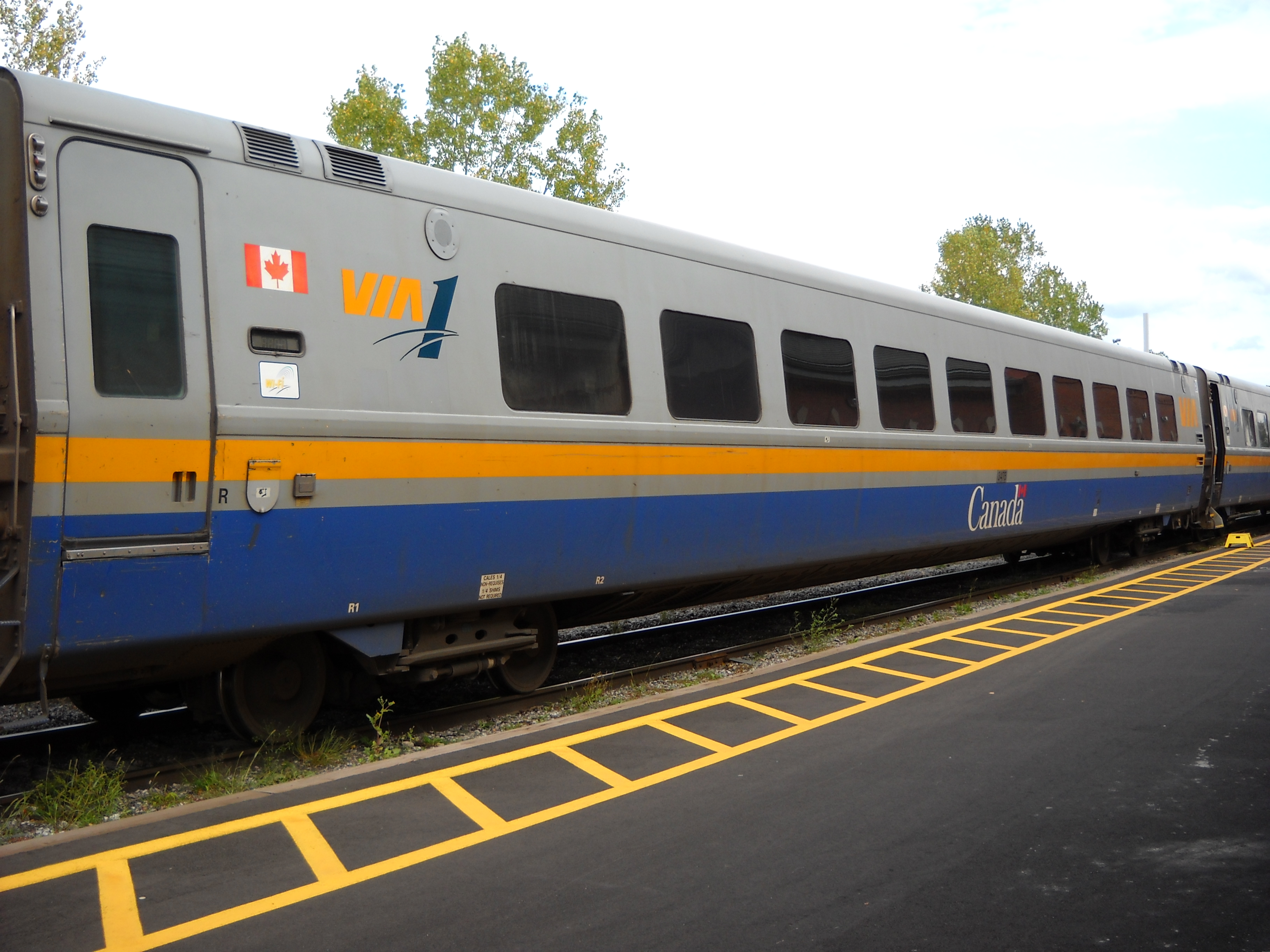
- An LRC passenger car
- Manufacturer: Bombardier Transportation
- Built at: La Pocatière, Quebec Via; Plattsburgh Amtrak
- Operators: Via Rail, Amtrak

Specifications
- Car body construction: Aluminum
- Car length: 85 ft (25.91 m)
- Width: 10 ft 5 1/2 in (3.19 m)
- Height: 12 ft 11 in (3.94 m)
- Floor height: 51 in (1,295 mm)
- Power supply: HEP 480 Volt
- Braking system: Air
- Coupling system: Tightlock coupling, APTA Type H
- Track gauge: 1,435 mm (4 ft 8 1/2 in) standard gauge

Most of the cars remained in service after the withdrawal of the LRC locomotives, though pulled by newer locomotives, usually P42DCs and often with the tilting mechanism disabled. From 2003 onwards, Via installed wireless internet on all Corridor trains, with distinctive white domes for the satellite downlink being installed on top of the first class cars. A new capital program announced by the Canadian government in October 2007 includes funding for the refurbishment of Via's remaining LRC cars. The tilting mechanisms will be removed as part of this project.

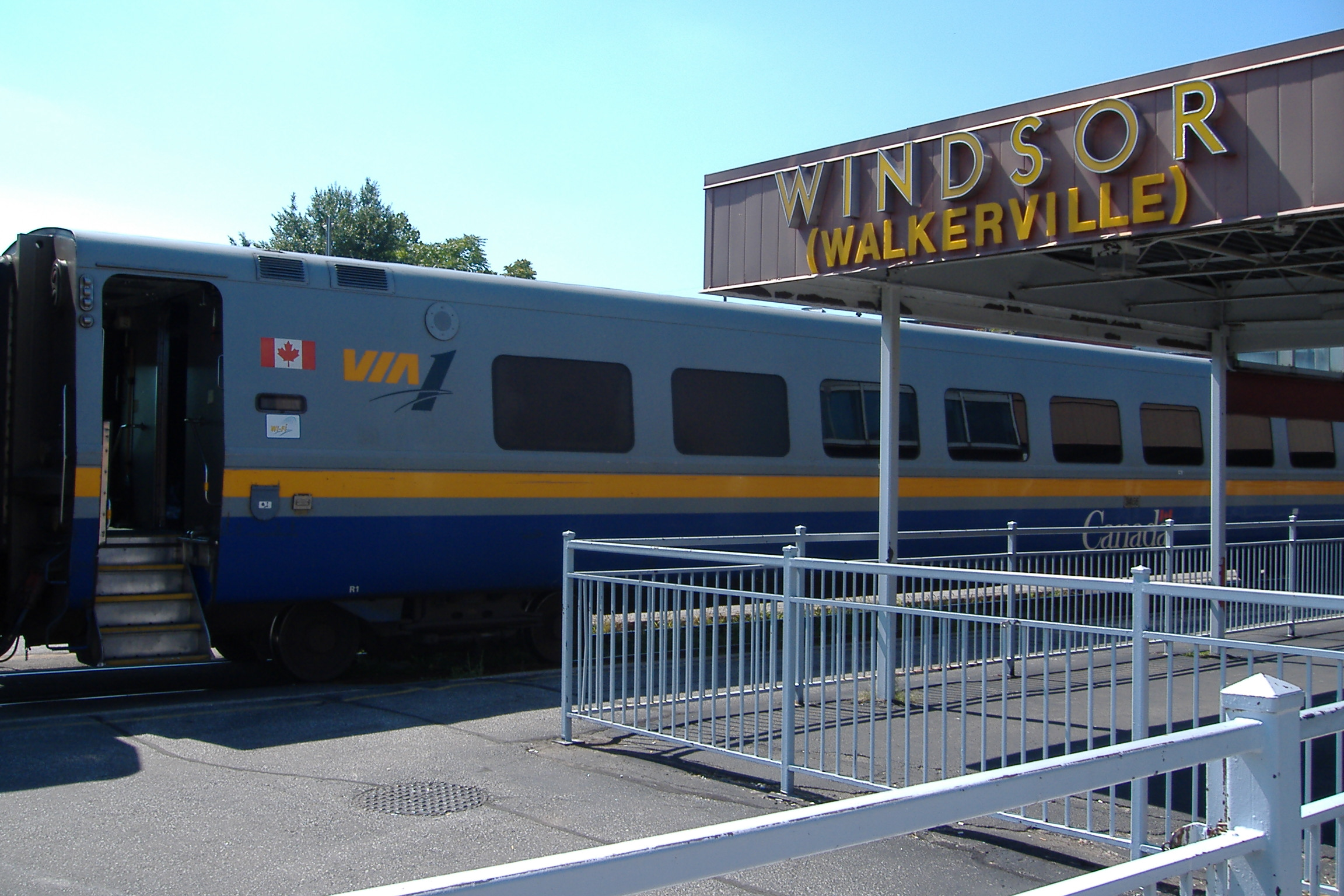
VIA 1 LRC at Windsor

== Legacy ==
Bombardier have since used updated versions of the LRC carriages and their tilt systems in the Acela electric high-speed trains they developed for Amtrak in the late 1990s (consisting of 26 club cars and 72 passenger cars), the Super Voyager in the United Kingdom and in the experimental Acela-derived JetTrain proposed in the mid-2000s for several corridors in Canada and the United States.

== Preservation ==
In August 2010, The Toronto Railway Historical Association announced that it had successfully concluded the purchase of LRC locomotive #6917 from Via Rail Canada, as part of its "Save The LRC" campaign. This locomotive was destined to be placed in The Toronto Railway Heritage Centre museum in the former Canadian Pacific John St. Roundhouse in Toronto, once the necessary money had been raised for the move. After it was found that it could still operate under its own power, it was decided to not move the locomotive and keep it in its current storage at VIA Rail's Toronto Maintenance Centre in Mimico. 6917 is maintained and operated by the VIA Historical Association. Major restoration was completed in 2014 with cosmetic work remaining.

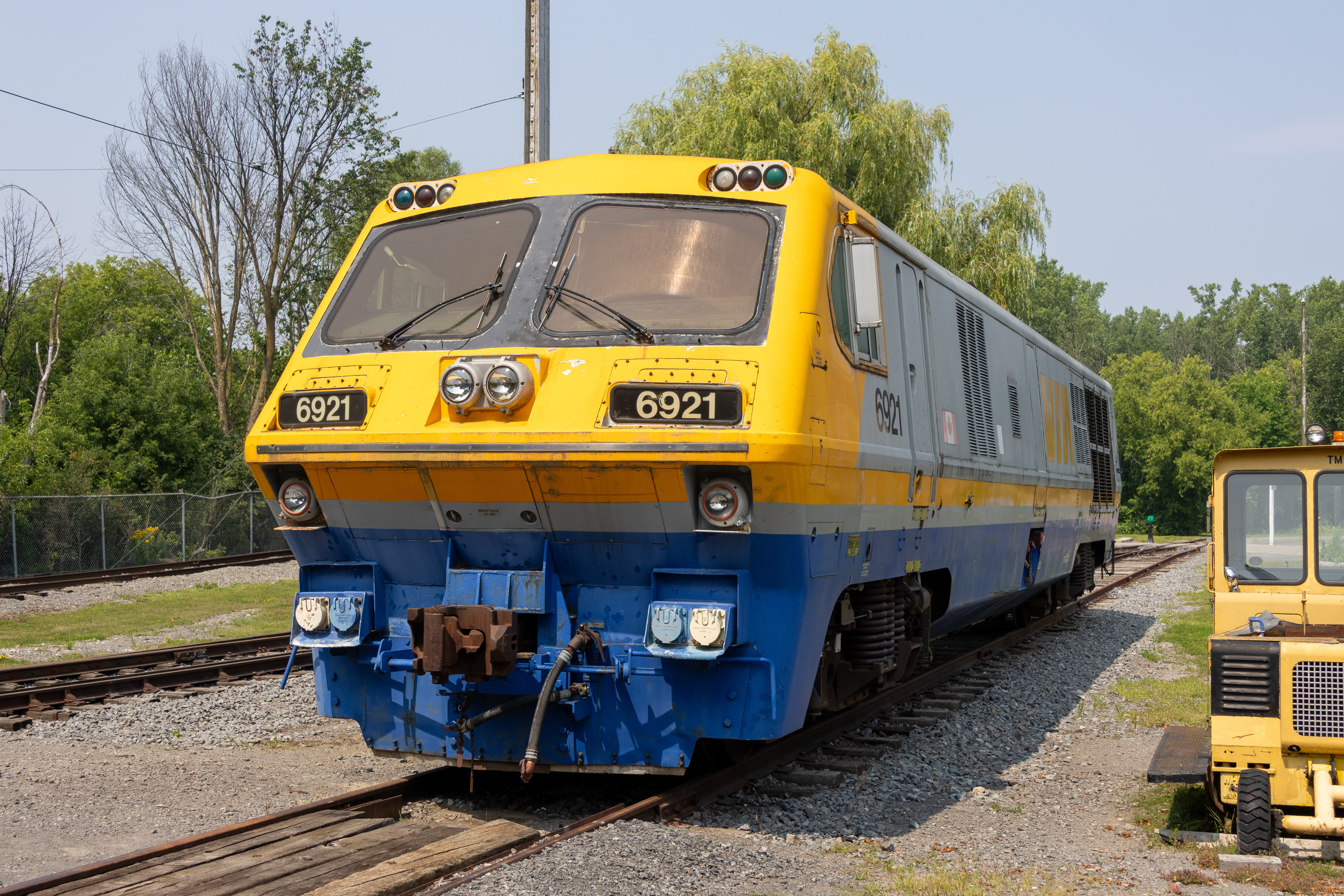
LRC #6921 preserved at the Canadian Railway Museum

LRC locomotive #6921 is preserved at the Canadian Railway Museum outside of Montreal. It ran under its own power in 2015. In 2026, the museum was donated coach no. 3308 by Via Rail.

== See also ==
- List of MLW diesel locomotives
- Tilting train
- UAC TurboTrain
- Acela
