= Acela Express (trainset) =

Trainset used on the Acela, Amtrak's high-speed Northeast Corridor service

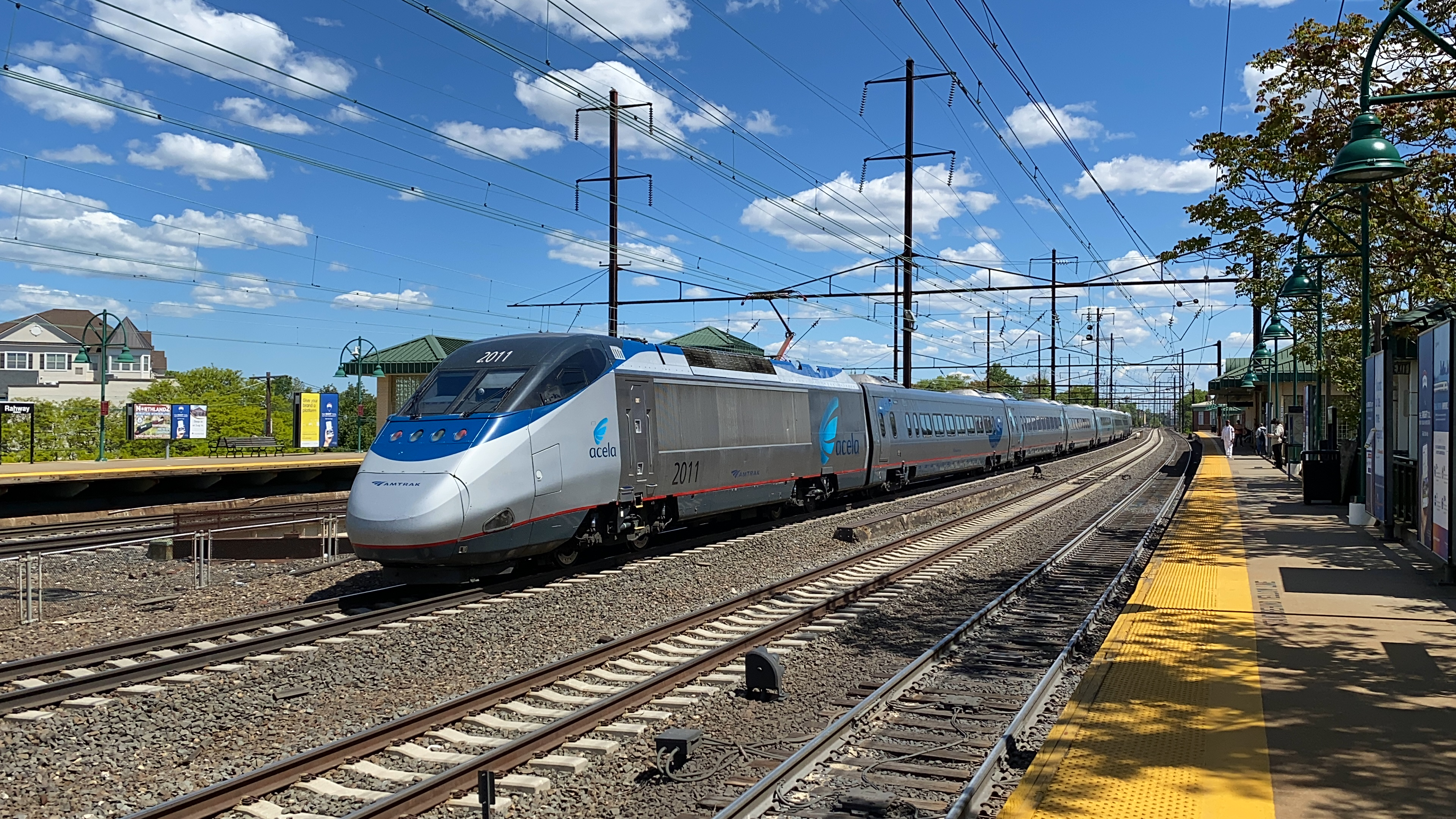
- Amtrak Acela Express train, trailed by power car #2011, at Rahway, New Jersey, in May 2021

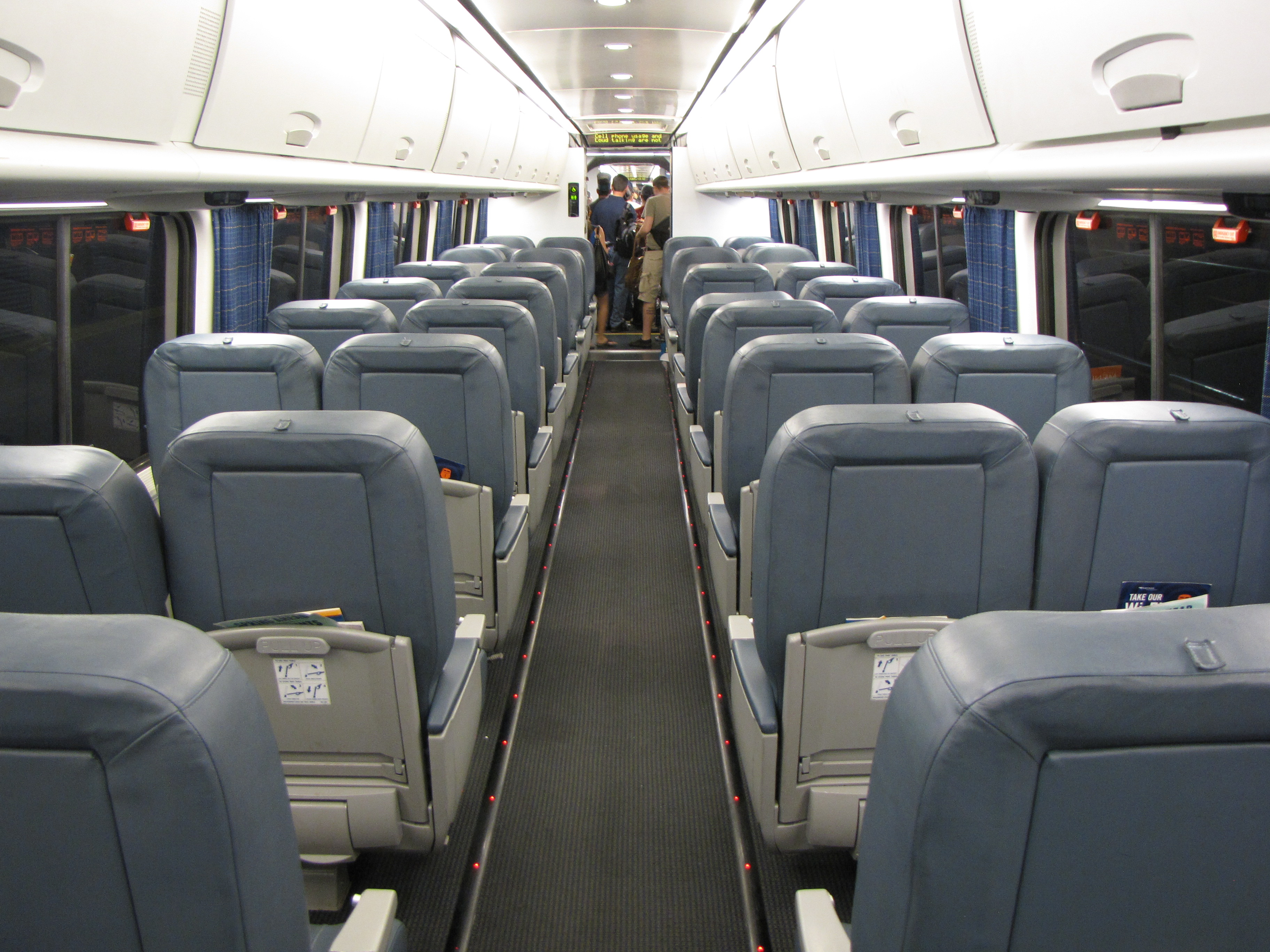
- Business Class car interior
- Manufacturers: Bombardier, Alstom
- Constructed: 1998–2001
- Entered service: 2000
- Number built: 20 sets
- Number in service: 10 sets
- Successor: Avelia Liberty
- Formation: 2 power cars and 6 coaches per set
- Fleet numbers: 2000–2039 (power cars)
- Capacity: 304 (44 in First Class, 260 in Business Class)
- Operator: Amtrak
- Depots: Ivy City, Washington, D.C.; Sunnyside Yard, Queens, NY; Southampton Street Yard, Boston
- Line served: Northeast Corridor

Specifications
- Car body construction: Stainless steel
- Train length: 663 ft 8 3/4 in (202.30 m)
- Car length: 69 ft 7 3/8 in (21.22 m) (power car); 87 ft 5 in (26.64 m) (coach)
- Width: 10 ft 5 in (3.18 m) (power car); 10 ft 4 1/2 in (3.16 m) (coach)
- Height: 14 ft 2 in (4.32 m) (power car, rail to roof); 13 ft 10 5/8 in (4.23 m) (coach)
- Floor height: 4 ft 3 in (1.30 m)
- Entry: Level
- Doors: Single leaf sliding plug doors: 4 per side (intermediate coaches); 2 per side (end coaches)
- Wheel diameter: 40 in (1,016 mm) (power car); 36 in (914 mm) (coach)
- Wheelbase: 35 ft 3 in (10.74 m) (power car); 59 ft 6 in (18.14 m) (coach)
- Maximum speed: 165 mph (266 km/h) (design); 150 mph (240 km/h) (service)
- Weight: 1,246,000 lb (565,000 kg) (trainset); 204,000 lb (93,000 kg) (power car); 142,000 lb (64,000 kg) (end coach); 139,000 lb (63,000 kg) (intermediate coach); 137,000 lb (62,000 kg) (bistro coach)
- Axle load: 51,000 lb (23,000 kg) (power car); 35,750 lb (16,220 kg) (coach)
- Traction system: Alstom GTO–VVVF inverter control
- Traction motors: 4 × Alstom 4-FXA-4559C 1,540 hp (1,150 kW) 3-phase AC induction motor
- Power output: 6,200 hp (4,600 kW)
- Tractive effort: 49,500 lbf (220.2 kN) (per power car, starting)
- Transmission: AC–DC–AC
- Power supply: 2850 V DC (PWM rectified) voltage regulated from mains re-inverted to three-phase, frequency and voltage controlled AC waveform
- Electric systems: Overhead line: 25 kV 60 Hz AC; 12.5 kV 60 Hz AC; 12 kV 25 Hz AC
- Current collection: Two pantographs per power car
- Braking systems: Dynamic and regenerative (power car); Electro-pneumatic disk and tread (coach)
- Safety system: Advanced Civil Speed Enforcement System (ACSES)
- Track gauge: 4 ft 8 1/2 in (1,435 mm) standard gauge

Notes/references
- Specifications

The first-generation Acela Express trainset is a unique trainset used on the Acela, Amtrak's flagship high-speed service along the Northeast Corridor (NEC) in the Northeastern United States. When they debuted in 2000, the sets were the fastest in the Americas, reaching speeds of up to 150 miles per hour (240 km/h) on 33.9 miles (54.6 km) of the route. Built between 1998 and 2001 by a consortium of Alstom and Bombardier, each set consists of two power cars derived from units that Alstom built for the TGV and six passenger cars based on the LRC design Bombardier created for Via Rail.

Although based on TGV technology, the Acela equipment is substantially heavier to meet Federal Railroad Administration crashworthiness standards, resulting in a lower power-to-weight ratio of about 22.4 horsepower (16.7 kW) per tonne (2,200 lb), compared to 30.8 hp (23 kW) for a SNCF TGV Réseau set. Unlike the TGV, the Acela incorporates active tilt technology, which mitigates lateral centrifugal force and allows higher speeds through the NEC's sharp curves without discomforting passengers.

The current Acela Express fleet is being replaced by new Avelia Liberty trainsets, similar to the SNCF TGV M, the first five entering service on August 28, 2025. The new trains offer increased passenger capacity and an enhanced active tilt system to allow faster speeds on curved sections of the route.

== History ==
=== Building and development ===
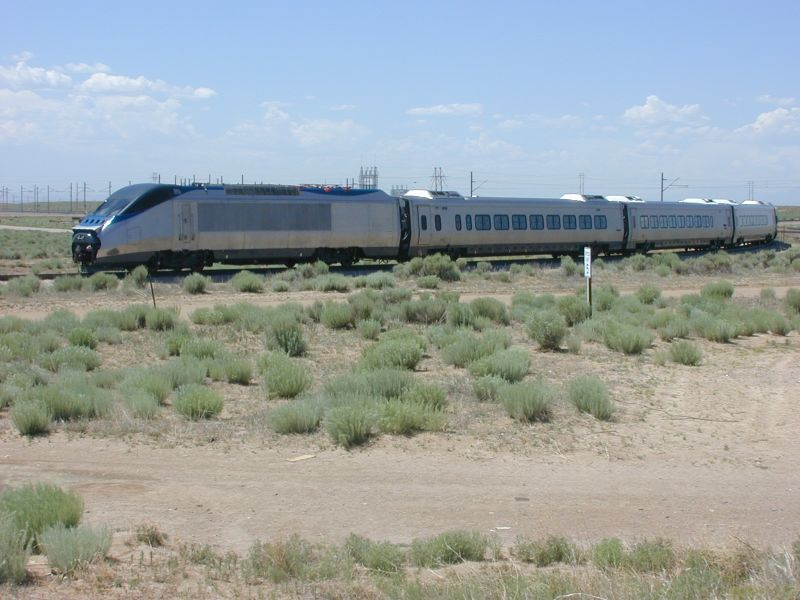
Acela Express trainset undergoing testing at Transportation Technology Center in 2000

In the early 1990s, Amtrak tested several different high-speed trains from Europe to explore the possibility of adding a high-speed rail service along the Northeast Corridor. An X 2000 train was leased from Sweden for test runs from October 1992 to January 1993, followed by revenue service between Washington DC and New York City from February to May and August to September 1993. Siemens showed the ICE 1 train from Germany, organizing the ICE Train North America Tour which started to operate on the Northeast Corridor on July 3, 1993.

This testing allowed Amtrak to define a set of specifications that went into a public tender in October 1994. Requirements for the trainset included the ability to reach 150 miles per hour (240 km/h) and withstand a collision with a freight train at speed without collapsing.

Most manufacturers which bid on the Acela were unable to meet the structural requirements, due to increased costs and complications for the manufacture of the trains, and the need for manufacturers to make significant engineering changes to their standard designs. In the end, only three qualified bidders remained: ABB (manufacturer of the X 2000 train), Siemens (manufacturer of the ICE), and a consortium of Bombardier (manufacturer of the LRC trains) and GEC Alsthom (manufacturer of the French TGV).

The consortium of Bombardier (75%) and GEC Alsthom (now Alstom) (25%) was selected in March 1996.

A pilot trainset was completed by early 2000, and sent to Transportation Technology Center for testing in June 2000. An inaugural VIP run of the Acela occurred on November 16, 2000, with the VIP train being led by power car number 2020 with no. 2009 at the opposite end, followed by the first revenue run on December 11, 2000, a few months after the intended date.

Amtrak's original contract was for the delivery of 20 sets (6 coaches each, with power cars at front and rear) for $800 million. By 2004, Amtrak had settled contract disputes with the consortium, paying a total of $1.2 billion for the 20 sets, plus 15 extra electric locomotives, and the construction of maintenance facilities in Boston, New York, and Washington.

=== Outages ===
In August 2002, shortly after their introduction, Acela sets were briefly removed from service when the brackets that connected truck (bogie) dampers (shocks) to the powerunit carbodies ("yaw dampers") were found to be cracking. The Acela returned to service when a program of frequent inspections was instituted. The damper brackets have since been redesigned and old brackets replaced by the newer design.

On April 15, 2005, the Acela was removed from service when cracks were found in the disc brakes of many passenger coaches. The Bombardier-Alstom consortium replaced the discs under warranty. Limited service resumed in July 2005, as a portion of the fleet operated with new brake discs. Metroliner trains, which the Acela Express was intended to replace, filled in during the outage. Amtrak announced on September 21, 2005, that all 20 trainsets had been returned to full operation.

=== Refurbishments ===
The Acela trainsets underwent minor refurbishments between mid-2009 and 2010 at Penn Coach Yard, next to 30th Street Station in Philadelphia, Pennsylvania. These refurbishments included new blue leather seats throughout the trainset.

By 2011, the Acela fleet had reached half of its designed service life. Amtrak proposed several replacement options, including one as part of its A Vision for High-Speed Rail in the Northeast Corridor. In 2011, Amtrak announced that forty new Acela coaches would be ordered in 2012 to increase capacity on existing trainsets. The existing trains would have received two more coaches, lengthening the trainsets from a 1-6-1 configuration to 1-8-1 (power car — passenger cars — power car). The longer trainsets would have required the modifications of the Acela maintenance facilities in Boston, New York and Washington. The first of the stretched trainsets was to have entered service in fiscal year 2014. This plan was cancelled in 2012 in favor of replacing, rather than refurbishing, the Acela fleet.

In May 2018, Amtrak announced a 14-month program to refresh the interiors of the Acela sets, including new seat cushions and covers, new aisle carpeting, and a deep clean. This refurbishment program has been completed as of June 2019.

=== Replacement ===
In January 2014, Amtrak issued a request for proposals on 28 or more new model Acela sets, in a combined order with the California High-Speed Rail Authority. These bids were due May 17, 2014. After discussions with manufacturers, Amtrak and the California High Speed Rail Authority concluded their needs were too disparate for common rolling stock and decided not to pursue the joint option. The present Acela Express equipment is being replaced by new Avelia Liberty trainsets (similar to SNCF TGV M), the first five of which started service on August 28 2025. The new trains have greater passenger capacity and an enhanced active tilt system that allows faster speed on the many curved sections of the route. Acela Express trainsets are expected to stay in operation until 2027, as the Avelia Liberty trainsets gradually replace them.

== Engineering ==
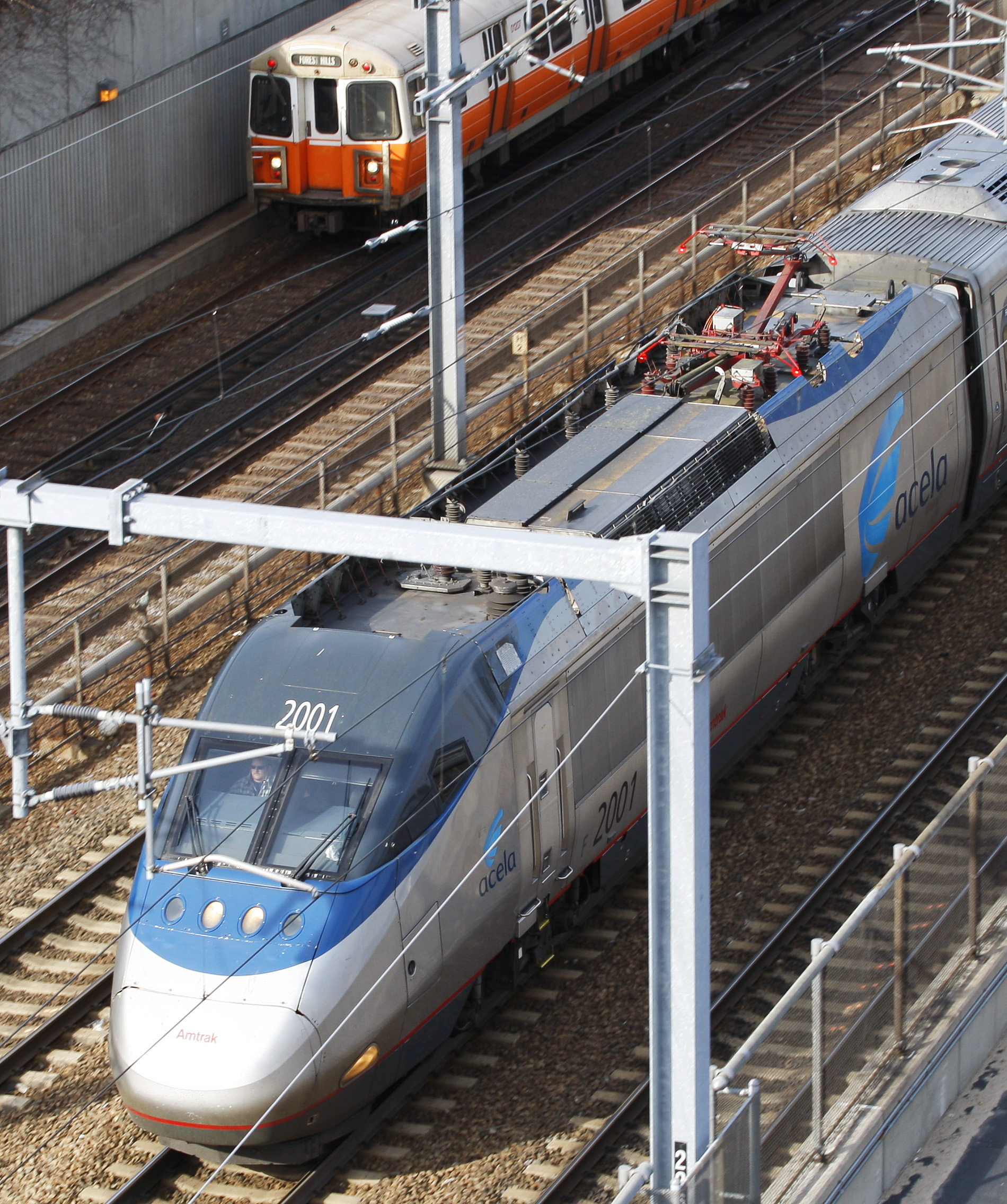
Overhead view of an Acela power car in Boston; an MBTA Orange Line subway train is also visible in the background.

=== Design ===
The sets use identical 6,200 horsepower (4,600 kW) power cars at each end which operate on three different AC electrical systems:

- 25 kV 60 Hz AC (Boston—New Haven, Northend Electrification)
- 12.5 kV 60 Hz AC (New Haven—New York City)
- 12 kV 25 Hz AC (New York City—Washington D.C., Southend Electrification)

It derives several components from the TGV, such as the third-generation TGV's traction system (including the four asynchronous AC motors per power car, rectifiers, inverters, and regenerative braking), the trucks/bogies structure (a long wheelbase dual transom H frame welded steel with outboard mounted tapered roller bearings), the brake discs (although there are only three per axle, versus four on the TGV), and crash energy management techniques to control structural deformation in the event of an accident.

The tilting carriages are based upon Bombardier's earlier LRC trains used on Via Rail rather than the TGV's non-tilting articulated trailers. Acela power cars and passenger cars are much heavier than those of the TGV in order to meet the FRA's crash standards. French and Canadian crews testing the Acela referred to it as "the pig" due to its weight. The extra weight leads to the Acela's power-to-weight ratio being about 22.4 hp (16.7 kW) per tonne, compared to 30.8 hp (23.0 kW) for a SNCF TGV Reseau set. The Tier II crash standards, adopted in 1999, have also resulted in the passenger cars being designed without steps and trapdoors, which means that the sets can only serve lines with high-level platforms such as the Northeast Corridor. Acela trains are semi-permanently coupled (but not articulated as in the TGV) and are referred to as sets.

=== Operating speeds ===
With a 71:23 gear ratio, the Acela is designed with a top speed of 165 mph (266 km/h) and reaches a maximum speed of 150 mph (240 km/h) in regular service on four sections of track totaling 41 miles (66 km) in New Jersey, Rhode Island, and Massachusetts. The Acela achieves an average speed (including stops) of 82.2 mph (132.3 km/h) between Washington and New York, and an average speed of 66 mph (106 km/h) from New York to Boston. The average speed over the entire route is a slightly faster 70.3 mph (113 km/h).

In practice, the Acela's speed depends more on local restrictions along its corridor than on its set. In addition to speed restrictions through urban areas, the Acela's corridor includes several speed restrictions below 60–80 mph (97–129 km/h) over older bridges, or through tunnels a century old or more. Altogether, Amtrak has identified 224 bridges along Acela's route that are beyond their design life.

To prepare for the Acela launch, Amtrak upgraded the track along the Connecticut shoreline east of New Haven to allow maximum speeds in excess of 110 mph (177 km/h). South of the Delaware River in Trenton, New Jersey, the Acela's top speed is 135 mph (217 km/h). One limiting factor is the overhead catenary support system which was constructed before 1935 and lacks the constant-tension features of the new catenary east of New Haven. The Pennsylvania Railroad ran Metroliner test trains in the late 1960s as fast as 164 mph (264 km/h) and briefly intended to run the Metroliner service at speeds reaching 150 mph (241 km/h). Certification testing for commercial operation at 160 mph (257 km/h) involving test runs at up to 165 mph (266 km/h) began between Trenton and New Brunswick in September 2012.

Acela Express's fastest schedule between New York and Washington, DC was 2 hours and 45 minutes in 2012. $450 million was allotted by President Barack Obama's administration to replace catenary and upgrade signals between Trenton and New Brunswick, which will allow speeds of 160 mph (257 km/h) over a 23 mi (37 km) stretch. The improvements were scheduled to be completed in 2016, but were delayed; the project was announced as completed in 2022, with additional improvements to 8 miles of catenaries between South Brunswick and Trenton slated to be completed in 2024. The Trenton-New Brunswick section of track holds the record for the highest speed by a train in the US, which is 170.8 mph (274.9 km/h), achieved in a test run by the U.S./Canada-built UAC TurboTrain on December 20, 1967.

=== Composition ===
The production sets are formed as follows:

Car no.		1	2	3	4	5	6		Total
Designation	Power	First Class	Business Class (quiet car)	Business Class	Cafe	Business Class		Power	
Weight (US ton, Metric ton)	102.0 (92.5)	71.0 (64.4)	69.5 (63.0)	69.5 (63.0)	69.5 (63.0)	69.5 (63.0)	71.0 (64.4)	102.0 (92.5)	623.0 (565.2)
Capacity	—	44	65	65	—	65	65	—	304

The Acela Express trainset consists of two power cars, a café car, a First Class car, and four Business Class cars, semi-permanently coupled together. Acela offers two classes of seating, Business Class and First Class. Unlike most other Amtrak trains, Business Class is the de facto standard class on Acela trains; there is no coach service. Power cars are numbered 2000–2039, First Class cars 3200–3219, Business Class cars 3400-3419 (end cars) and 3500–3559, and café cars 3300–3319.

The First Class car has 44 seats, being three seats across (one on one side, two on the other side), four seat tables and assigned seating. There are 260 Business Class seats on each set; these cars have four seats across (two on each side) and four-seat tables. Baggage may be stowed in overhead compartments or underneath seats. Trains are wheelchair-accessible. Each car has or two toilets, with one being ADA compliant. Automatic sliding doors between cars reduce noise.

The Acelas are capable of forming longer trainsets. A 9-car trainset was successfully tested in 2011 to explore lengthening existing trainsets to add capacity, but ordering additional cars was deemed uneconomical after discussions with Bombardier. The power cars are designed to handle up to a 10-car trainset.

Acela maintenance typically occurs at the Ivy City facility in Washington, DC; Sunnyside Yard in Queens, New York; or Southampton Street Yard in Boston.
