= UAC TurboTrain =

Early high-speed, gas turbine train

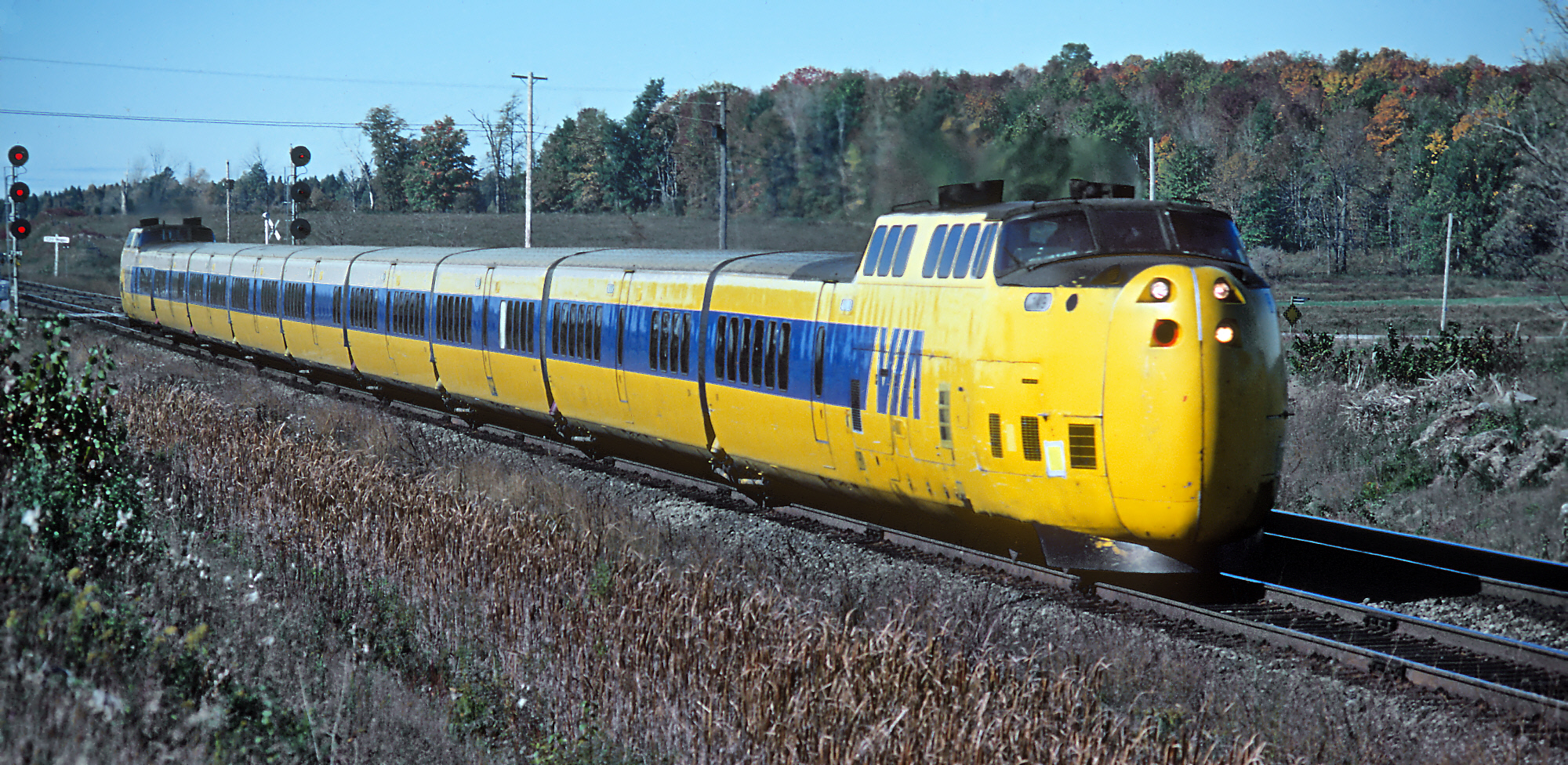
- A Via Rail TurboTrain in October 1980
- In service: 1968–1982 (Canada); 1968–1976 (US)
- Manufacturer: United Aircraft Corporation
- Constructed: 1967–1968
- Number built: 7 trainsets
- Number preserved: 0
- Number scrapped: 7
- Formation: 9 cars per trainset (CN/Via); 7 cars per trainset (CN); 5 cars per trainset (Amtrak); 3 cars per trainset (New Haven)
- Capacity: 322 (seven-car set)
- Operators: Canadian National Railways; Via Rail; Amtrak; New Haven; Penn Central; Illinois Central Railroad (Proposed)
- Depots: Tracks 4, 5, 6 – Montreal Central Station (Via/CN); Wilmington Shops – Bear, DE (Amtrak)

Specifications
- Car body construction: Aluminum
- Train length: 7 cars: 430 ft 8 in (131.27 m)
- Car length: Power cars: 73 ft 3 in (22.33 m); Intermediate cars: 56 ft 10 in (17.32 m)
- Width: 10 ft 5 in (3.18 m)
- Height: Coach: 10 ft 11 in (3.33 m); Dome: 12 ft 11 in (3.94 m); Exhausts: 13 ft 10 in (4.22 m)
- Floor height: 2 ft 7 in (0.79 m)
- Maximum speed: Service: 120 mph (193 km/h); Design: 170 mph (274 km/h); Record: 170.8 mph (274.9 km/h)
- Weight: 7 cars: 165.6 long tons (185.5 short tons; 168.3 tonnes)
- Traction system: Direct drive through gearbox
- Prime mover: Pratt & Whitney Canada ST6
- Engine type: Gas turbine (Turboshaft)
- Power output: 7 car: 2,000 hp (1,491 kW) (400 hp or 298 kW per engine)
- Transmission: Mechanical
- Electric systems: Third rail, 600 V DC (into Grand Central Terminal only)
- Current collection: Contact shoe
- Track gauge: 4 ft 8 1/2 in (1,435 mm) standard gauge

The UAC TurboTrain was an early high-speed gas turbine trainset manufactured by United Aircraft Corporation (UAC) that operated in Canada between 1968 and 1982 and in the United States between 1968 and 1976. The TurboTrain was among the first gas turbine-powered trains in regular service, and one of the earliest tilting trains introduced in North America.

== Description ==
=== Chesapeake & Ohio design study ===
A series of design studies carried out by Chesapeake and Ohio Railway in the 1950s used the second-generation Talgo design for their car suspensions. The suspension arms of each adjacent pair of cars were connected to a shared articulated bogie (or "truck") located between them, instead of each car having its own pair of bogies. The bogies rode the common curve between the two cars, centered by traction springs that centered the axle between adjoining car bodies. TurboTrain cars were built approximately 2.5 feet (76 cm) lower than standard passenger cars, reducing the center of gravity relative to the pivot point of the suspension arms. The arms included air springs to smooth out the motion, although it still felt "odd" while the train navigated short turns in switchyards and stations.

As with the earlier articulated trains, this meant that train lengths would be difficult to change. Their solution to this problem was to modify the power cars (engines) to allow the trains to be coupled end-to-end. Since articulated trains required "special" cars at either end anyway (to fill in the otherwise missing bogie), the C&O was double-ended, with a power car at each end. The power cars were organized with their two diesel engines on either side of the car, and the operators' cabin in a "pod" on top. This left enough room for a passageway to run between the engines and under the pod to the nose of the car, where a coupling and doors were hidden behind a pair of movable clamshell covers. That way the train could be attached front-to-end with another, providing some of the flexibility in train lengths that coupled cars offered, while still being as lightweight as a normal articulated design.

=== TurboTrain ===
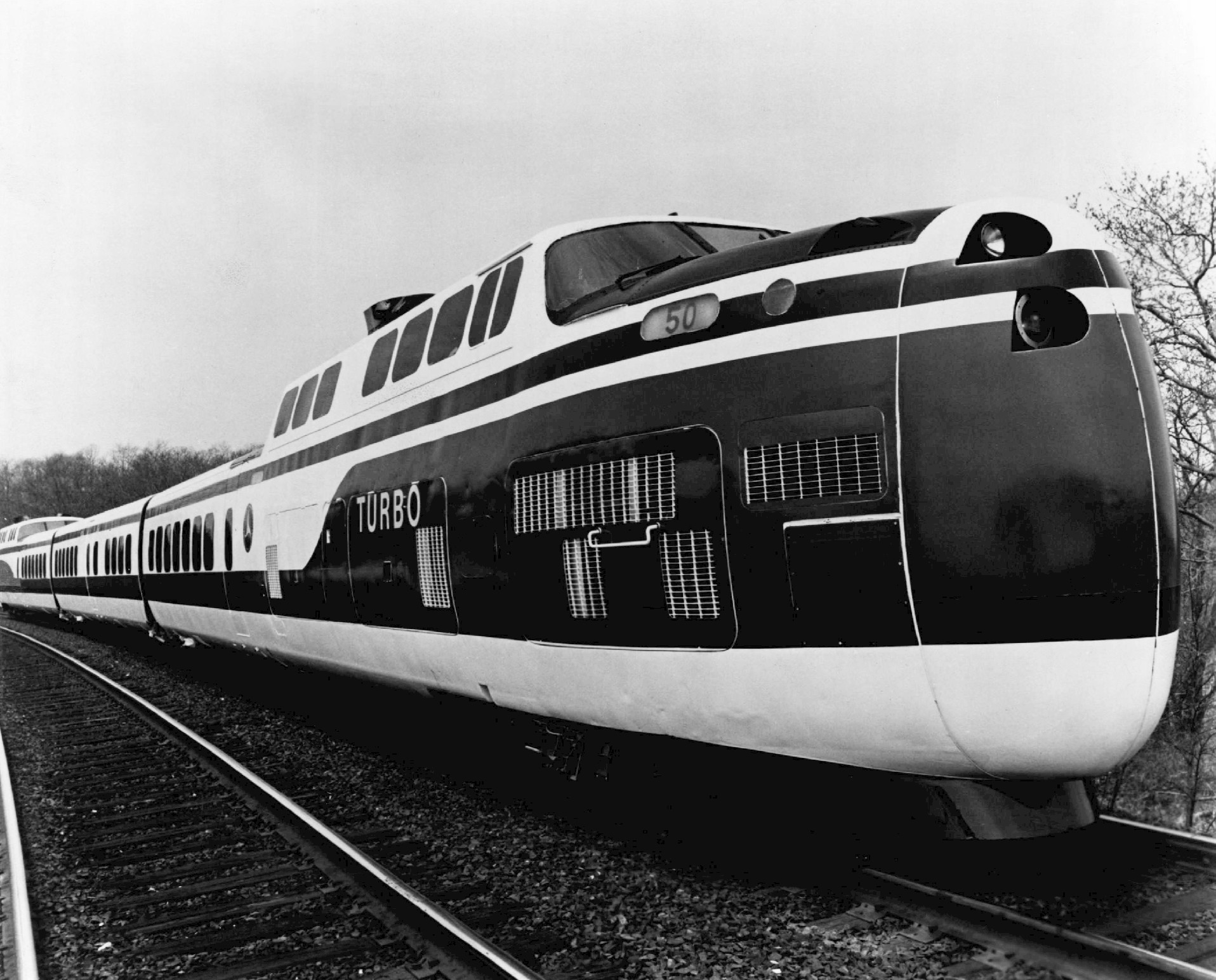
Turbo in DOT paint prior to Amtrak's inception, 1971

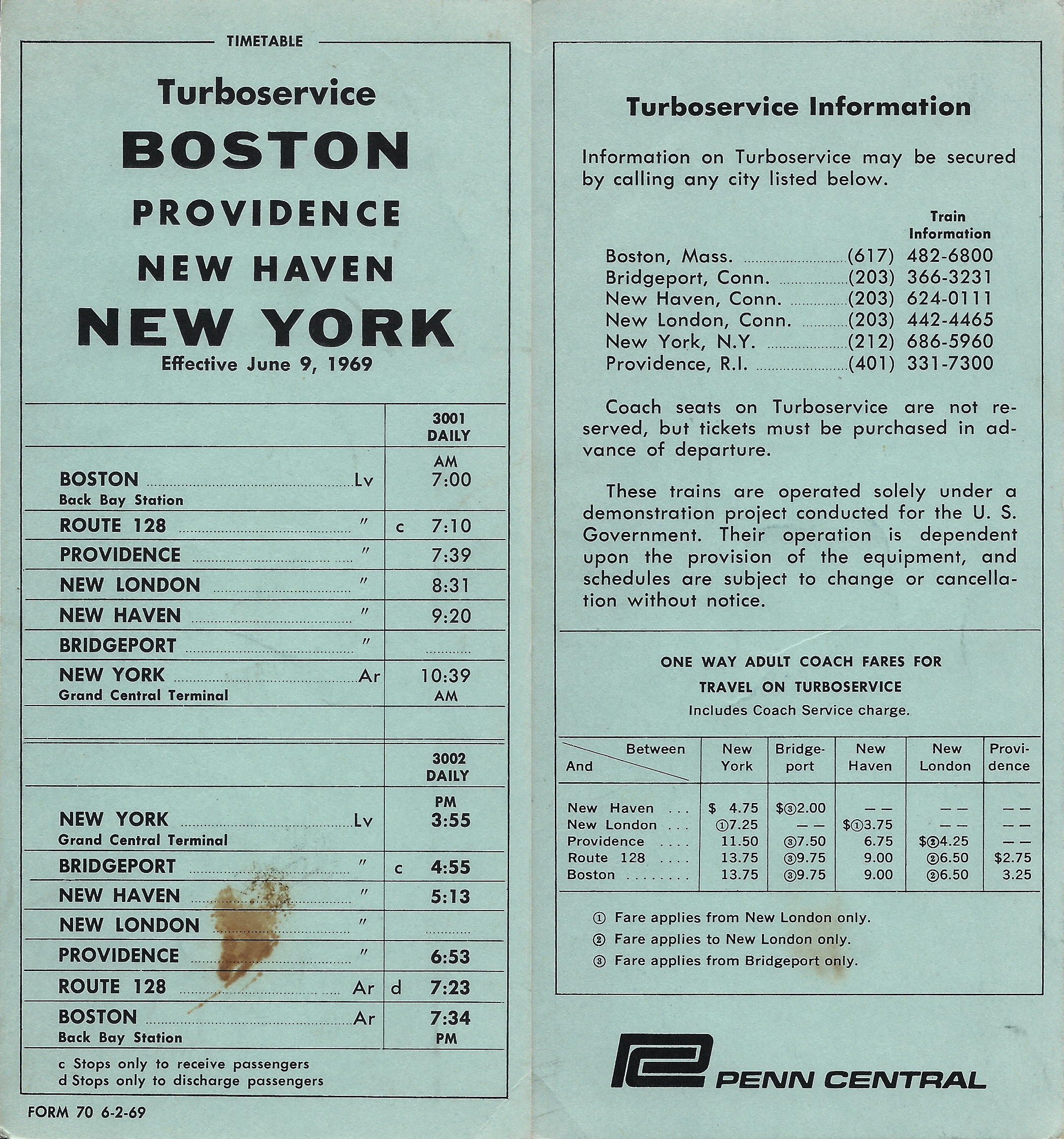
Penn Central passenger timetable in the early days of the United Aircraft TurboTrain (June 1969) showing daily round-trip between Boston's Back Bay Station and New York's Grand Central Terminal.

C&O's early work went undeveloped until the 1960s. At that time two major forces began operating that would re-invent the concept as the TurboTrain; one was the US Department of Transportation's desire to update train service in the US as a result of the High Speed Ground Transportation Act of 1965, the other was CN Rail's desire to update their passenger service with the ending of "pooled service" (with CP Rail) between Toronto and Montreal.

United Aircraft Corporation (UAC) purchased the C&O patents to enter into the DOT's Northeast Corridor Demonstration Project. The TurboTrain was designed by personnel of the Corporate Systems Center Division (CSC) of UAC, at Farmington, Connecticut. The design was similar to the original C&O version, but modified to use turbine power instead of diesel. The chosen engines were a modified version of the Pratt & Whitney Canada PT6 (also a UAC division) known as the ST6, downrated from 600 to 300 hp (450 to 220 kW). The PT6 uses a "free turbine" that acts as a torque coupler, so the new design did not require a transmission and was able to drive the powered wheels directly. The power cars had three engine bays on either side of the car and could mount engines in pairs for two to six turbines, depending on the needs of the carrier. Another ST6 drove an alternator to provide 'hotel' electrical power for the train. Each power car had a fuel capacity of 5,774 litres; 1,525 US gallons (1,270 imp gal).

The turbine engines were smaller and lighter (300 pounds or 140 kilograms with accessories) than the diesels they replaced, so the original power cars ended up being much larger than needed. Instead of a major redesign, UAC re-arranged the interior of the existing layout. The control room "pod" on top was lengthened to produce a viewing area with seating, and additional seating was added along the main level as well. This produced the Power Dome Cars (PDC) that were 73 feet 3 inches (22.33 m) long (tip of nose to trailing articulated axle, while the Intermediate Cars (IC) were 56 feet 10 inches (17.32 m) long (axle to axle), considerably shorter than the 85-foot-long (26 m) conventional passenger cars of this period.

The ability to connect trains together remained largely unchanged, although the routing of the internal passage changed slightly to rise up into the observation area of the pod, then back down under the control room and from there to the nose.

Contemporary reviews in the Canadian press noted that the TurboTrains generated significantly higher track noise than conventional equipment and exhibited rough ride quality, particularly on curves. With one journalist stating that "the single-axle articulation in practice negotiates curves in a series of short jerks rather than the smooth flowing motion promised in press releases".

The single-axle bogies on the Turbotrain were very mechanically complex and the suspension arms were "telescopic arms which were in essence ball-bearing screw actuators; the suspension of the inside-bearing powered bogies was "especially complex" and attached to the turbines via "an intricate web of mechanical couplings and shafts".

== Production and use ==
=== U.S. service ===
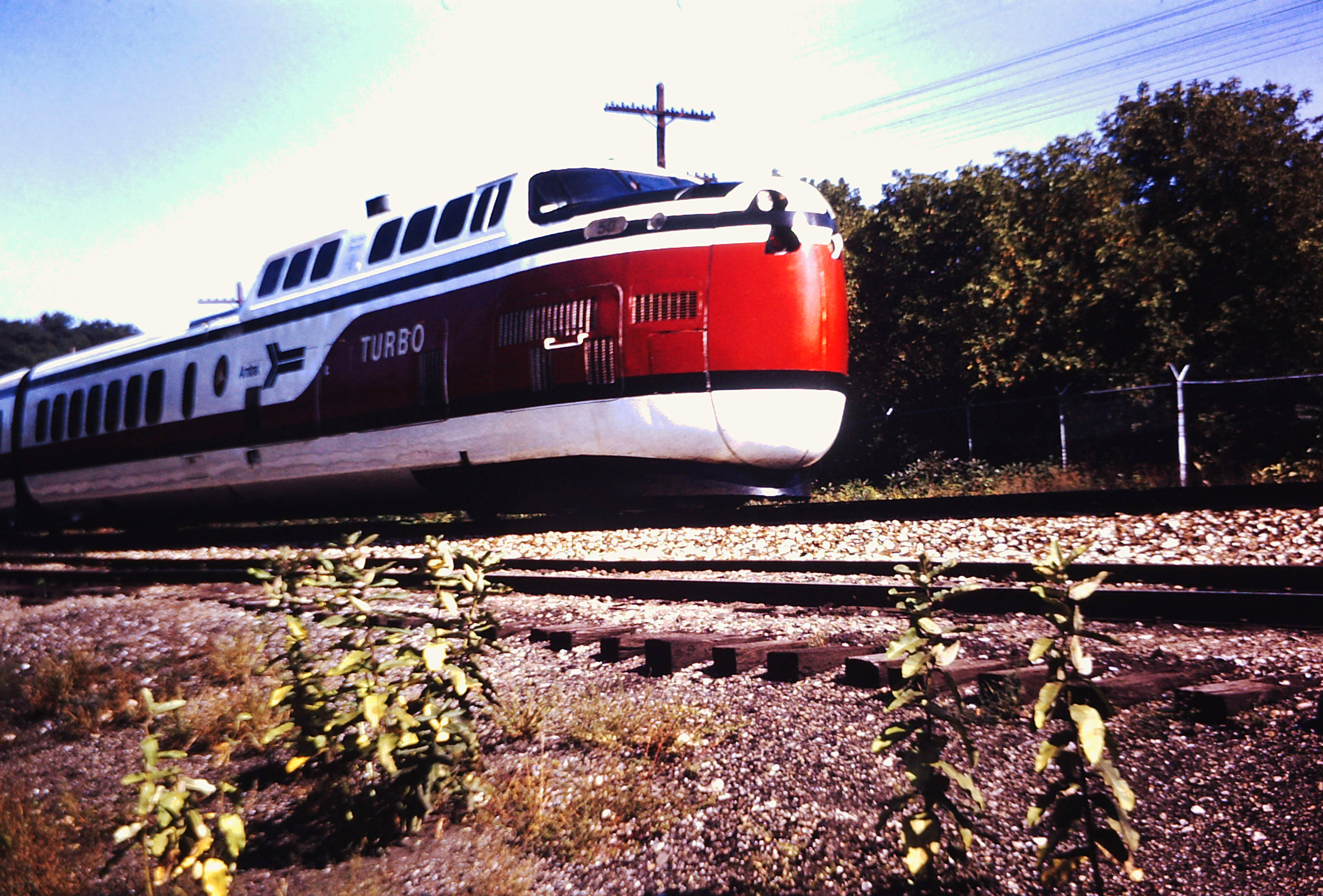
An Amtrak TurboTrain arriving at Ann Arbor, Michigan, in September 1971

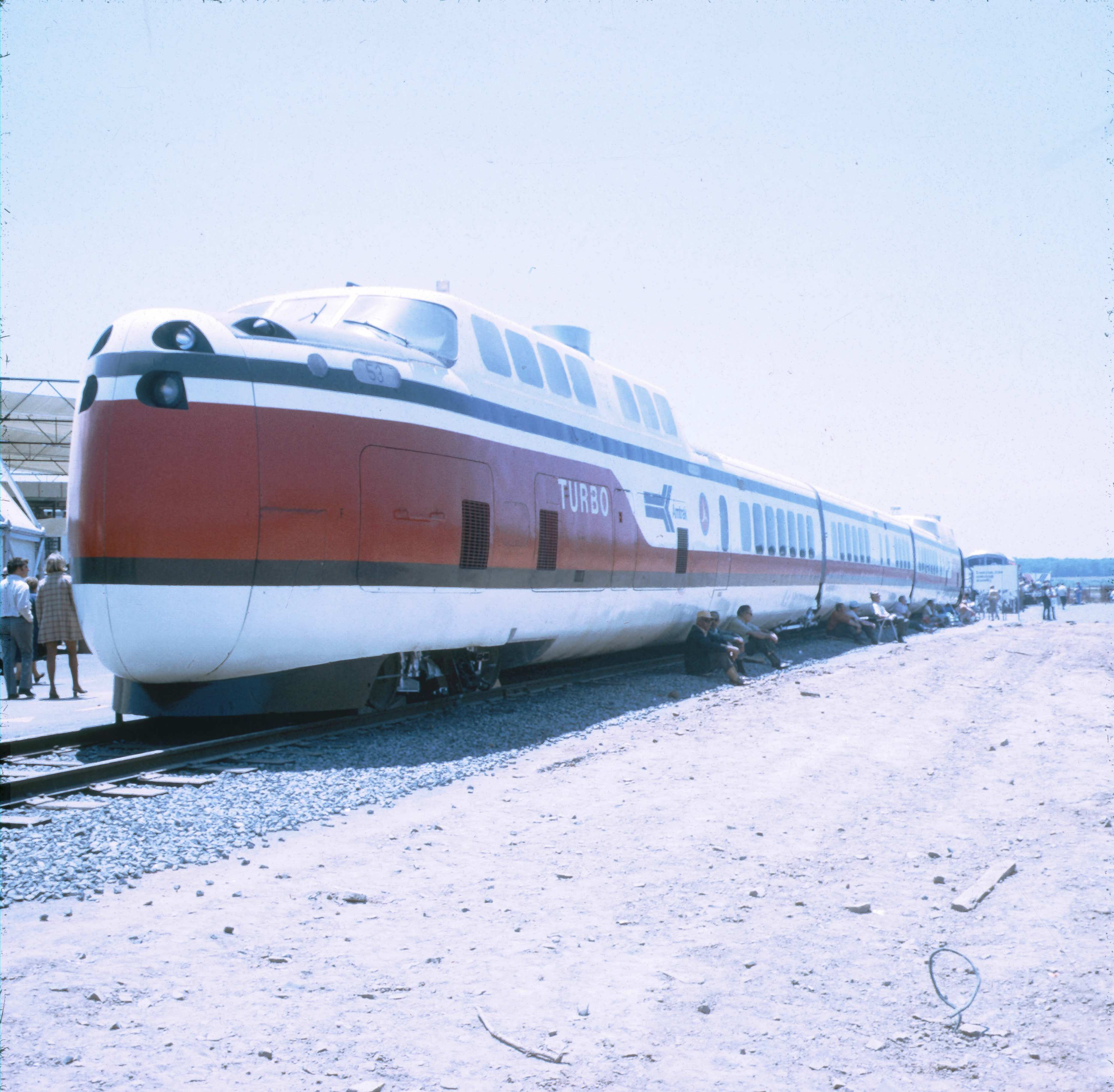
An Amtrak TurboTrain on display at Transpo '72

Two Turbotrains (DOT1 and DOT2) were built at the Pullman Works in Chicago. High-speed testing of the trains was performed from a base at Fields Point in Providence, Rhode Island, using track between Route 128 near Boston and Westerly, Rhode Island (track segments along this section, to this day, are the only areas where Amtrak operates Acela revenue service at 150 mph).

After its construction at the Pullman yards in Chicago, the Turbotrain was sent eastward on August 1, 1967, at regular speed and without passengers, to Providence, Rhode Island, in order for UAC Aircraft Systems engineers to tear it down, study it for further development, and then eventual high-speed testing on the PRR's specially-rebuilt track between Trenton and New Brunswick, New Jersey.

In a competition with a GE powered Metroliner on the Pennsylvania Railroad's main-line between Trenton and New Brunswick, New Jersey, on December 20, 1967, one of the TurboTrains reached 170.8 mph (274.9 km/h). This remains the world speed record for gas turbine-powered rail vehicles.

On January 1, 1968, the TurboTrain program was transferred from CSC to Sikorsky Aircraft Division (SA) of UAC. The United States Department of Transportation leased both trainsets and contracted with the New Haven Railroad to operate them. The New Haven had been in bankruptcy since July 2, 1961; on January 1, 1969, it was absorbed into the Penn Central Railroad, which inherited the contract. On April 8, 1969, Penn Central placed the equipment in service on the Northeast Corridor between Boston and New York City. The three-car sets carried 144 people and operated at a maximum speed of 100 miles per hour (160 km/h). The TurboTrains were equipped with third rail shoes for operation into Grand Central Terminal. In their first year of operation the trains' on-time performance approached 90 percent. They covered the 230 miles (370 km) in three hours and 39 minutes.

After railroad bankruptcies and amid threats of more, the National Railroad Passenger Corporation (Amtrak) took over passenger service for most U.S. railroads, including the Penn Central, on May 1, 1971. Amtrak continued Turbotrain service between Boston and New York, switching to Pennsylvania Station as its New York terminal. It also briefly ran Turbotrains elsewhere. Some service was from Washington, DC, through West Virginia and Ohio to Chicago.

In September 1976, Amtrak ceased revenue runs of Turbotrain trainsets and moved them to the Field's Point Maintenance Yard in Providence, Rhode Island, pending any possible sales to CN. An additional attempt was made to sell the units to the Illinois Central, but the poor mechanical condition of the trainsets caused the deal to fall through. Amtrak finally disposed of the trains in 1980.

=== Canadian service ===
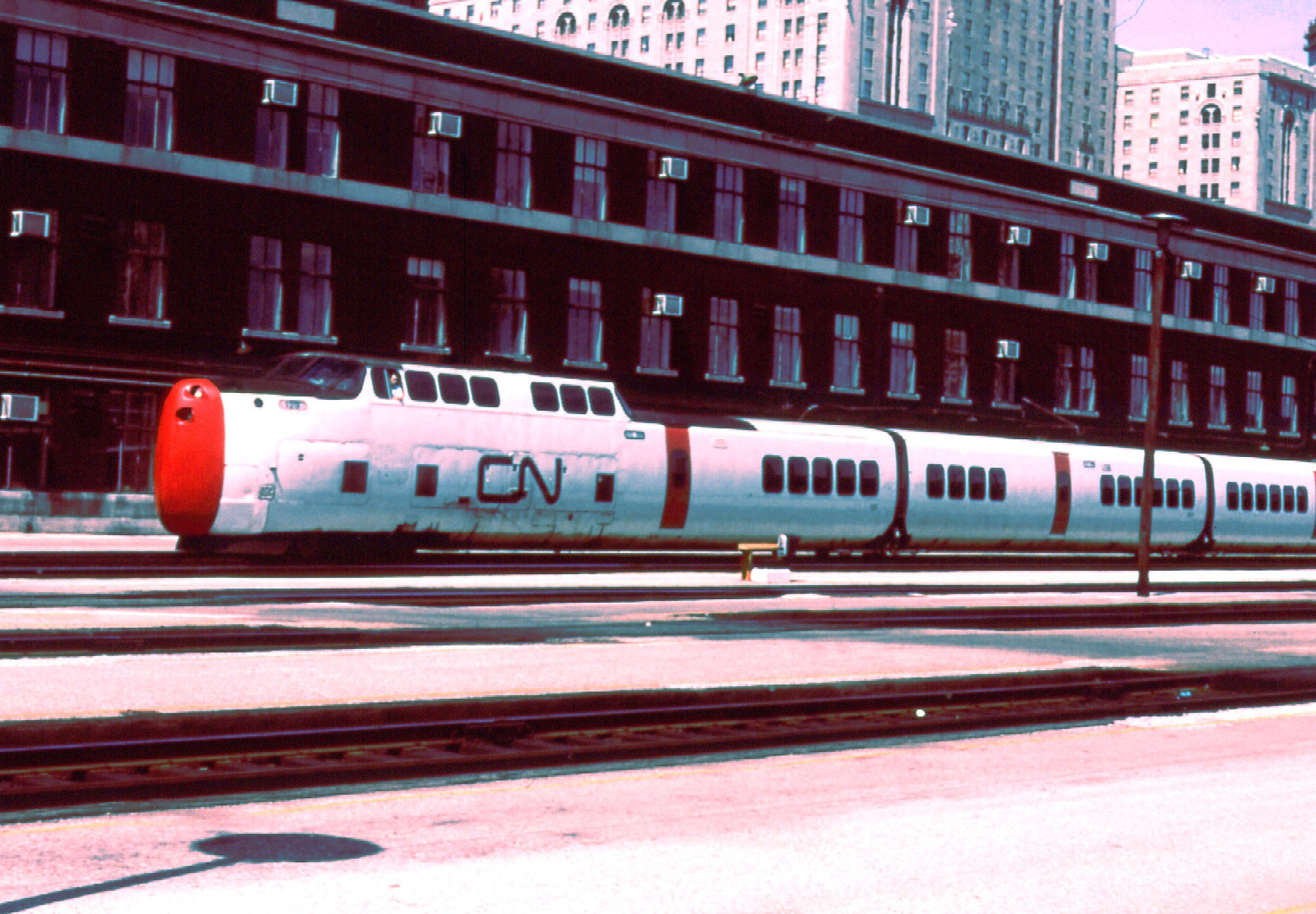
TurboTrain in CN livery, Toronto, 1975

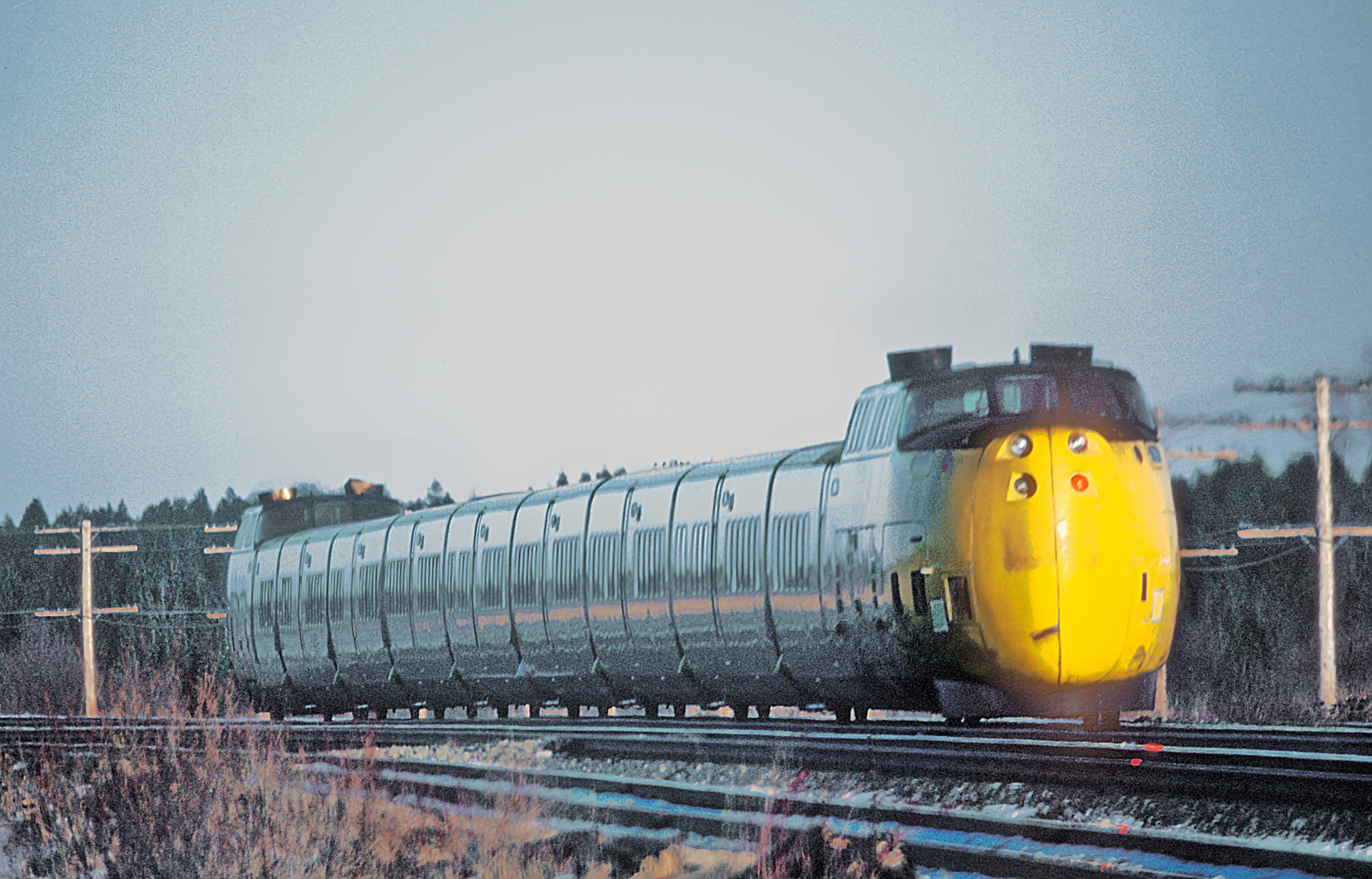
TurboTrain in Via livery, March 1980

In May 1966, Canadian National Railways ordered five seven-car TurboTrains for the Montreal-Toronto service. They planned to operate the trains in tandem, connecting two trains together into a larger fourteen-car arrangement with a total capacity of 644 passengers. The Canadian trains were built by Montreal Locomotive Works, with their ST6 engines supplied by UAC's Canadian division (now Pratt & Whitney Canada) in Longueuil, Quebec. The Canadian Turbotrains were originally planned to have been in service by the summer of 1967, but technical difficulties with the trainsets delayed passenger service entry until December 12, 1969; the primary failures concerned the auxiliary equipment and caused the power on the trains to go out.

CN and their ad agency wanted to promote the new service as an entirely new form of transit, so they dropped the "train" from the name. In CN's marketing literature the train was referred to simply as the "Turbo", although it retained the full TurboTrain name in CN's own documentation and communication with UAC. A goal of CN's marketing campaign was to get the train into service for Expo 67, and the Turbo was rushed through its trials. It was late for Expo, a disappointment to all involved, but the hectic pace did not let up and it was cleared for service after only one year of testing – most trains go through six to seven years of testing before entering service.

The Turbo's first demonstration run, in December 1968, carried a large press contingent. An hour into its debut run, the Turbo collided with a truck at a highway crossing near Kingston. Despite the concerns that lightweight trains like the Turbo would be dangerous in collisions, the train remained upright and largely undamaged. Large beams just behind the nose, designed for this purpose, absorbed the impact of the collision and limited the damage to the fiberglass clamshell doors and underlying metal. The train was returned from repairs within a week. No injuries occurred, although the incident has sometimes been cited as a setback for Canada's efforts to modernize passenger rail.

Initial commercial service started soon after. On its first westbound run the Turbo attained 104 mph (167 km/h) 10 minutes outside of Dorval. During speed runs on April 22, 1976, it achieved 140.55 mph (226 km/h) near Gananoque, the Canadian record to this day. However, in regular passenger service the Turbotrains were limited to 95 mph (153 km/h) in Canada because of the Canadian route's numerous grade-crossings, estimated at 240 public highway grade-crossings and 700 agricultural or private crossings between Montreal and Toronto.

Technical problems, including brake systems freezing in winter, required a suspension of service in early January 1969. Service resumed in May 1970; however, technical problems again caused the Canadian National to withdraw all Turbotrains from service again in February 1971. At this point, the CN management publicly expressed great dissatisfaction with these trainsets, with one vice-president claiming, "the trains never did measure up to the original contract and they haven't yet"; the manufacturer United Aircraft Company publicly claimed that CN suspended Turbotrain service for relatively minor technical problems. Railroad analysts, including Geoffrey Freeman Allen (editor of Jane's World Railways), noted that the Turbotrains employed too many advanced, derived technologies which had been packed in "without extended practical evaluation in railroad conditions. From transmission to suspension to auxiliaries, far too many vital components seemed to have been translated straight from the drawing board to the series production line.

During the "downtime" CN changed their plans, and in 1971 a rebuild program began, converting the five seven-car sets to three nine-car sets. Several minor changes were added. The engine exhaust fouled the roof windows of the power car, so these were plated over, and a grill was added to the front of the engines just behind the clamshell doors. The remaining power and passenger cars were sold to Amtrak as two four-car sets. One of those sets sideswiped a freight train on a test run in July 1973 and three of the cars were written off. The sale of the surviving Power Dome Coach car was cancelled, and it stood spare until a sister unit caught fire and burned in September 1975.

The three rebuilt 9-car sets entered service for CN in late 1973. CN ran the Turbos from Toronto-Montreal-Toronto with stops at Dorval, Kingston and Guildwood on the Quebec City-Windsor Corridor. Original train numbers were Train 62 which left Toronto at 12:45 p.m. and arrived in Montreal at 4:44 p.m. Train 63 left Montreal at 12:45 p.m. and arrived in Toronto at 4:44 p.m. (Both were daily trains.) Train 68 left Toronto at 6:10 p.m. and arrived in Montreal at 10:14 p.m., while Train 69 left Montreal at 6:10 p.m. and arrived in Toronto at 10:14 p.m. (The evening trains did not run on Saturdays.) The trip took 3 hours and 59 minutes downtown-to-downtown on trains 62 and 63, while the evening trains were slightly slower, taking four hours and four minutes to complete the run. Turbo service was about a full hour faster than CN's previous express trains, the "Rapido". However, even the runs made by the Turbotrains in the late 1970s still fell substantially short of their intended 120 mph design speed; the fastest average speed for the Turbotrain in regular scheduled Canadian passenger service was an intermediate booking from Kingston to Guildwood (102 minutes for the 145.2 miles between the two cities nonstop at an average speed of 85.4 mph (137.4 km/h).

By 1974, after substantial modifications of the gearbox device and pendular suspension, and reinforcement of the sound insulation, the Turbotrains finally took up untroubled service. CN operated the Turbos until 1978, when their passenger operations were taken over by Via Rail, who continued the service.

One of the three remaining trains developed an oil leak and caught fire on the afternoon run from Montreal to Toronto on May 29, 1979. It was stopped west of Morrisburg. It took some time for the fire engines to arrive as they were forced to drive on the trackbed. The power car and two coaches were totally destroyed. There were no injuries, although rapid disembarkation was needed. The train was eventually towed back to the Turcot yard in Montreal and remained there for several years, covered by tarpaulins.

The Turbo's final run was on October 31, 1982, when they were replaced by the all-Canadian LRC trainsets from Bombardier Transportation, which employed conventional diesel-electric locomotives. Although they had an early reputation for unreliability, according to CN's records, the rebuilt TurboTrains had an availability rate of over 97% for their careers with CN and Via. The LRC suffered from similar teething problems, notably with the tilt system locking the cars in a tilted position.

The withdrawal of the Turbotrains was also precipitated by the rise in oil prices during the 1973 oil embargo and the following years, which destroyed "one of gas turbine traction's prime advantages, fuel cost economy".

=== Legacy and influence ===
Although the UAC TurboTrain program ended without any preserved examples, its design and engineering concepts influenced several later high-speed rail projects in North America. The TurboTrain's tilting technology and articulated carbody structure directly inspired developments in the Canadian LRC (Light, Rapid, Comfortable) trainsets introduced by Bombardier in the early 1980s. In the United States, lessons learned from the TurboTrain's turbine propulsion and aerodynamic profile informed later Department of Transportation studies that contributed to Amtrak's Acela Express program in the 1990s. The train remains an early example of North American efforts to develop domestically produced high-speed rail technology.

== See also ==
- Gas turbine-electric locomotive
- JetTrain
