= Power car =

Type of rail vehicle

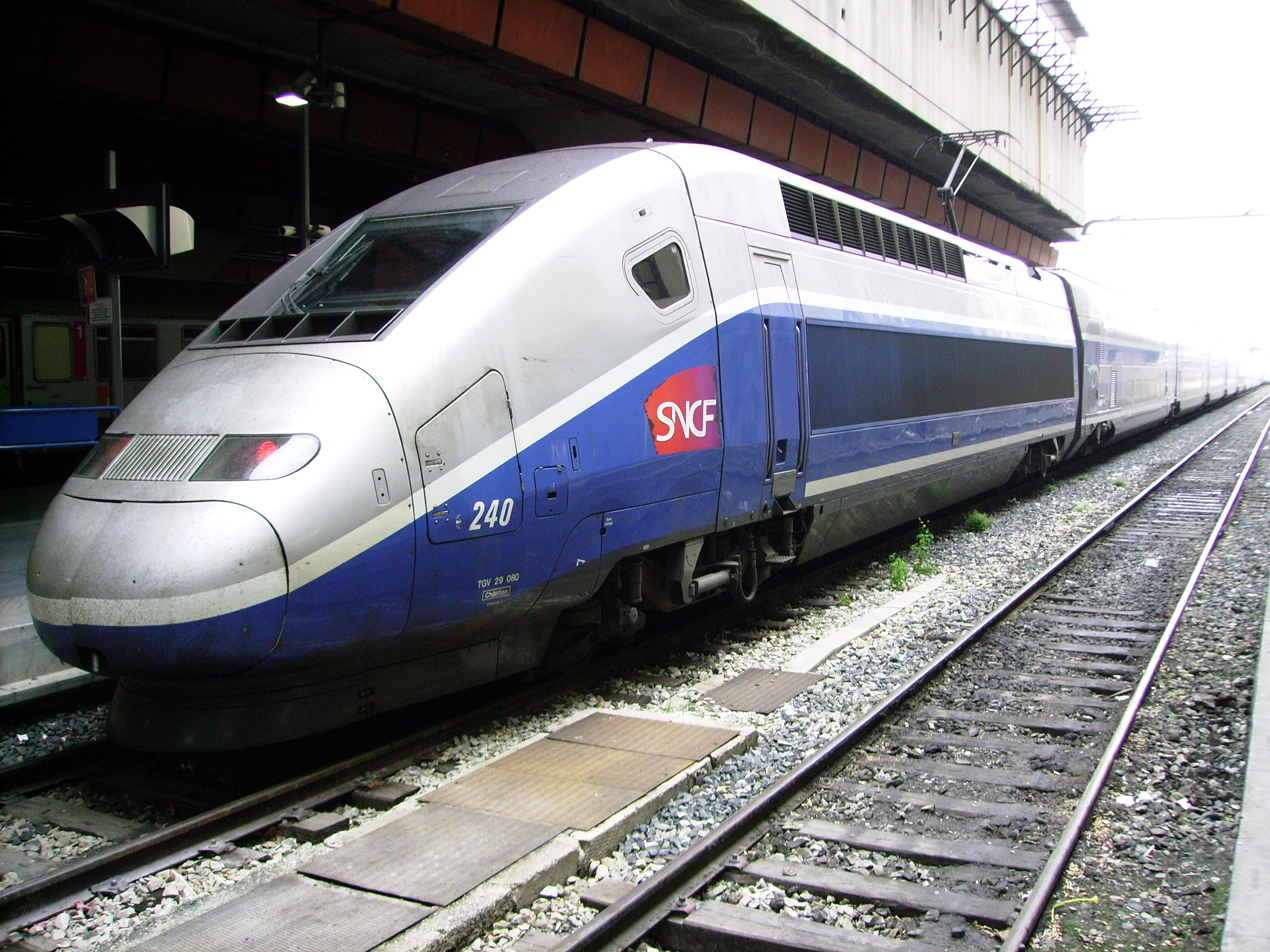
SNCF TGV Duplex power car 240 at Gare de Marseille-Saint-Charles, France.

In rail transport, the expression power car may refer to either of two distinct types of rail vehicle:

- a vehicle that provides traction to a passenger trainset or multiple unit; commonly having driving controls;
- a vehicle equipped with machinery for supplying heat or electrical power to other parts of a train, also known as a generator car.

The first of these types of vehicle is closely related to the locomotive. What differentiates the locomotive and the first type of power car is their construction or use. A locomotive can be physically separated from its train and does nothing but provide propulsion and control (and heat or electricity for passenger trains). On the other hand, a power car of the first type is frequently an integral part of its train with a gangway connection between the train and the power car, and if the train uses distributed traction, some of the car's interior space may be used for carrying passengers or cargo.

== Examples ==
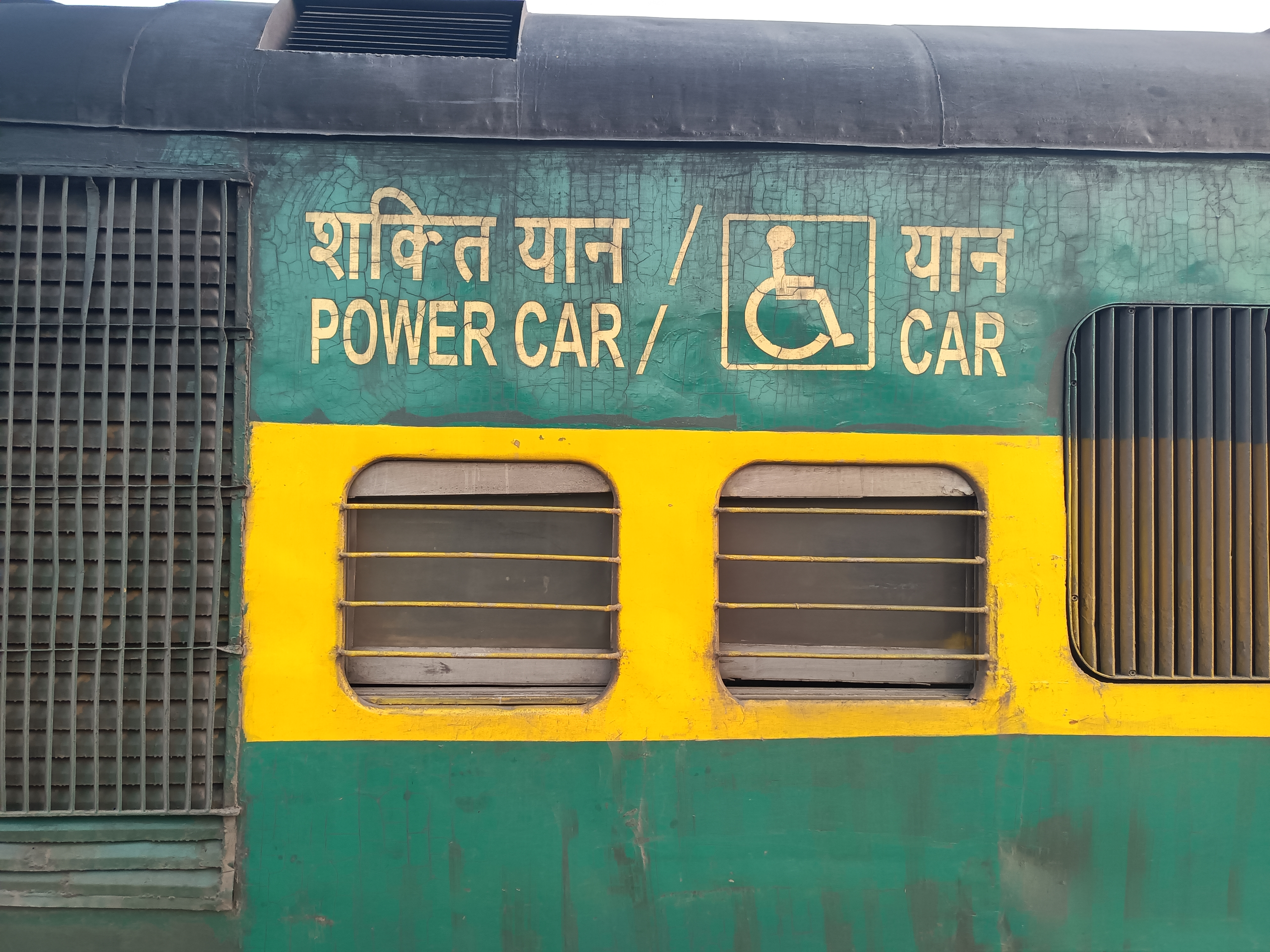
A power car of Indian Railways

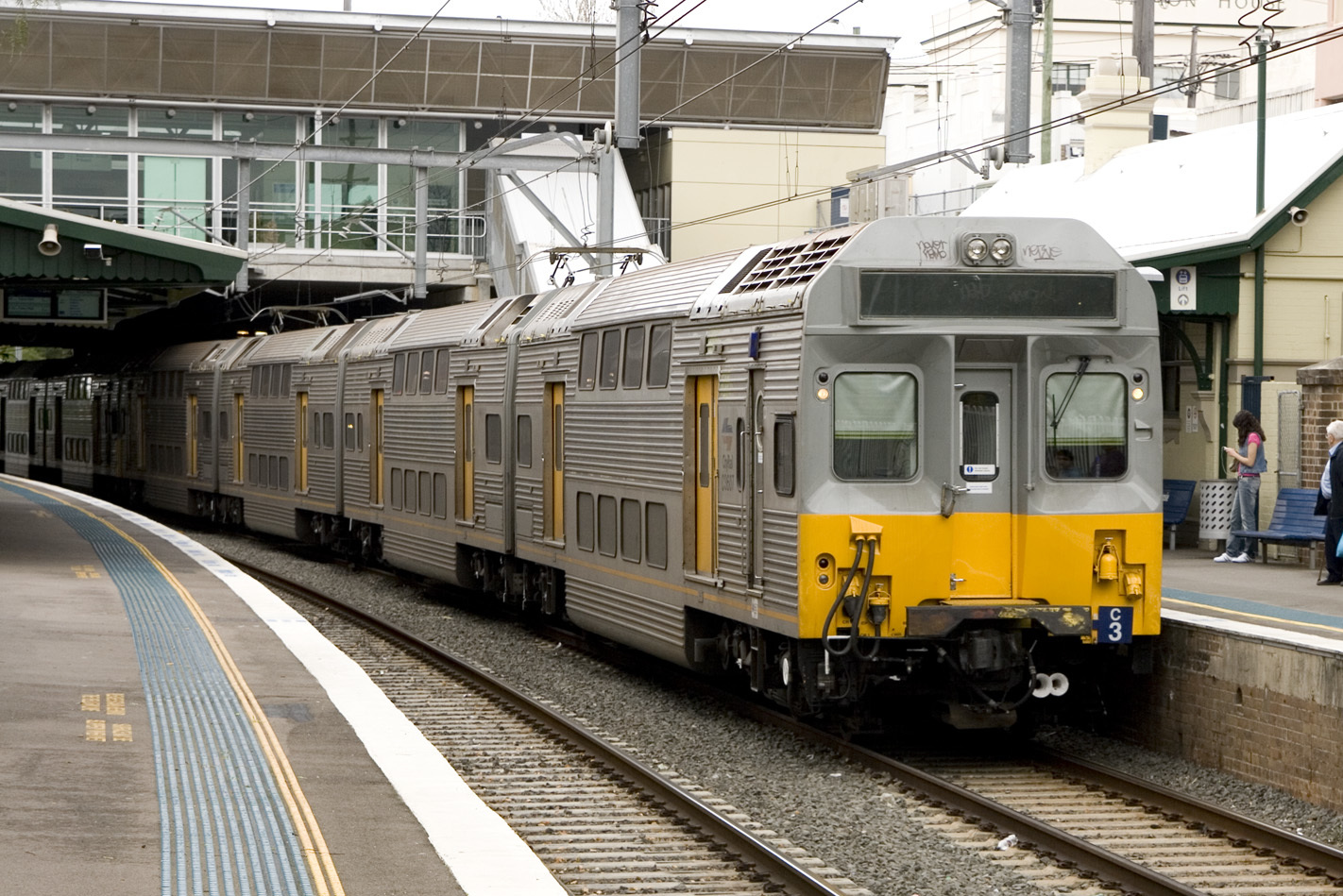
A Sydney Trains C set at Campsie station. It consists of two power cars, one at each end, with two trailers in between.

=== United States ===
Nearly all high speed trains use power cars, frequently at both ends. An example of these are the Acela Express and NextGen Acela trainsets in use by Amtrak, which are built by Bombardier in Canada using technology licensed from France's Alstom. The twenty Acela trainsets operate between Washington, D.C., and Boston, Massachusetts. Each trainset consists of six passenger cars and two power cars. Another example is Brightline, which operates between Miami and Orlando International Airport. It is a trainset composed of two diesel bullet power cars at both ends and 4-7 passenger cars.

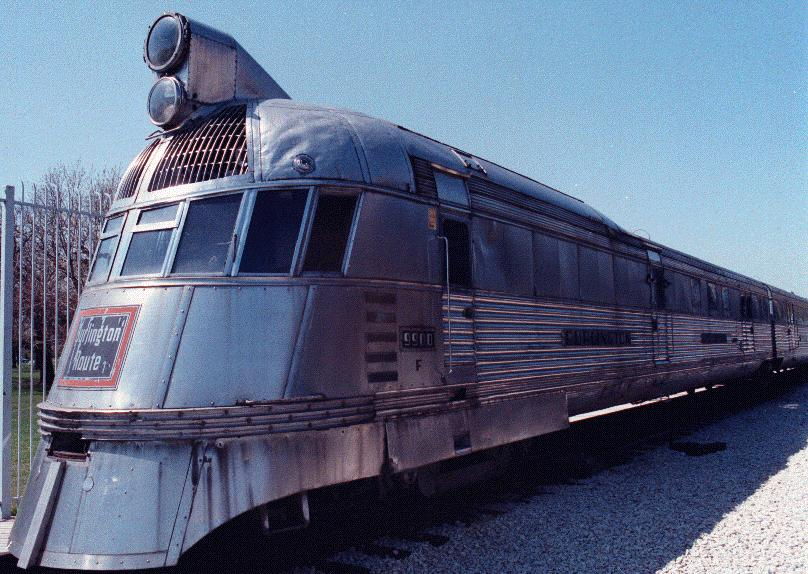
Power car of the Pioneer Zephyr

Historically, diesel streamliners, such as the Zephyr sets built by the Budd Company and the Union Pacific Railroad's M-1000x series used power cars articulated with the trainset.

=== United Kingdom ===
Another traditional example would be the older InterCity 125, made for and used by British Rail and several subsequent privatised bodies like Great Western Railway.

=== New Zealand ===
Multiple units (diesel or electric) usually have a mix of power cars and trailers, often with one of each in a pair which can be coupled to other pairs to form a larger train; see e.g. New Zealand FP class electric multiple unit.

=== India ===
The power supply generation in Indian Railways is based on end-on-generation (EOG), in which a train's hotel load (power supply for lights, fans, air conditioning, pantry, etc.) is provided with electricity from 2 power cars attached to both ends of the train. Each of these power cars is equipped with one diesel alternator set that supplies 3-phase power at 750 volts 50 Hz through two sets of feeders running along the rake and coupled in between with the help of inter-vehicle couplers. Each coach then picks up the power supply through a 60 kVA transformer and brings down the voltage to 110 volts, at which the equipment in compartments run.

This technology is gradually being replaced by a newer energy-efficient power supply system called head-on generation (HOG), where power supply is drawn from overhead equipment through converters provided in electric locomotives for hotel load. This system is leading to huge savings in diesel fuel consumption (amounting to ₹1,182 crore (US$120 million) as on 20 November 2019).

=== Australia ===
The NSW TrainLink XPT, which is based on the InterCity 125, has a power car at each end, one pulling and the other pushing. The Queensland Rail Diesel Tilt Train also has two power cars. Electric Multiple Units, such as the Sydney Trains C set, have power cars on each end with trailer cars in the middle.
