= Tilting train =

Type of train that can tilt in curves

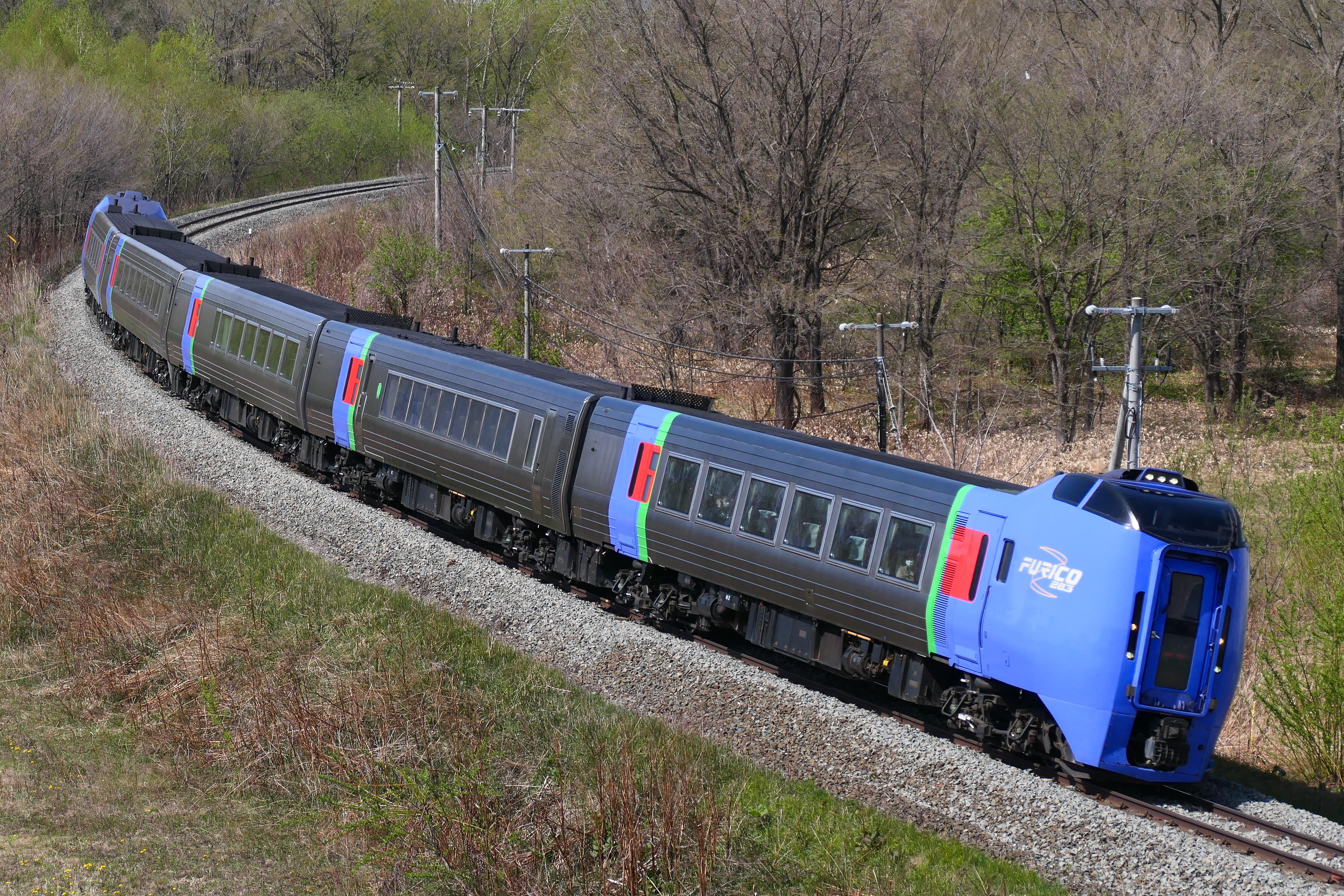
A Japanese KiHa 283 series tilting DMU, which can tilt up to 8° (6° in normal operation)

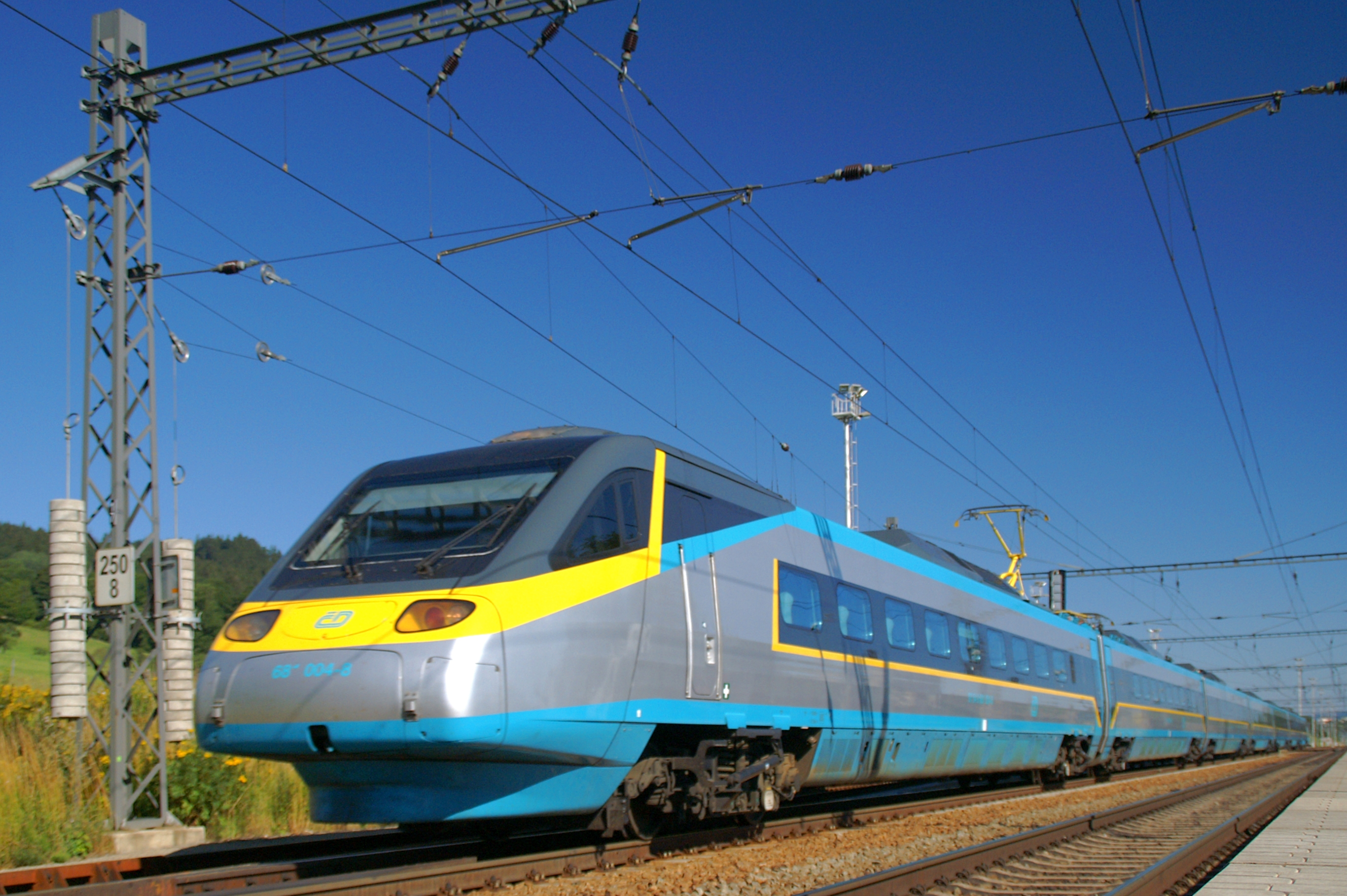
A ČD Class 680 Pendolino train in July 2006

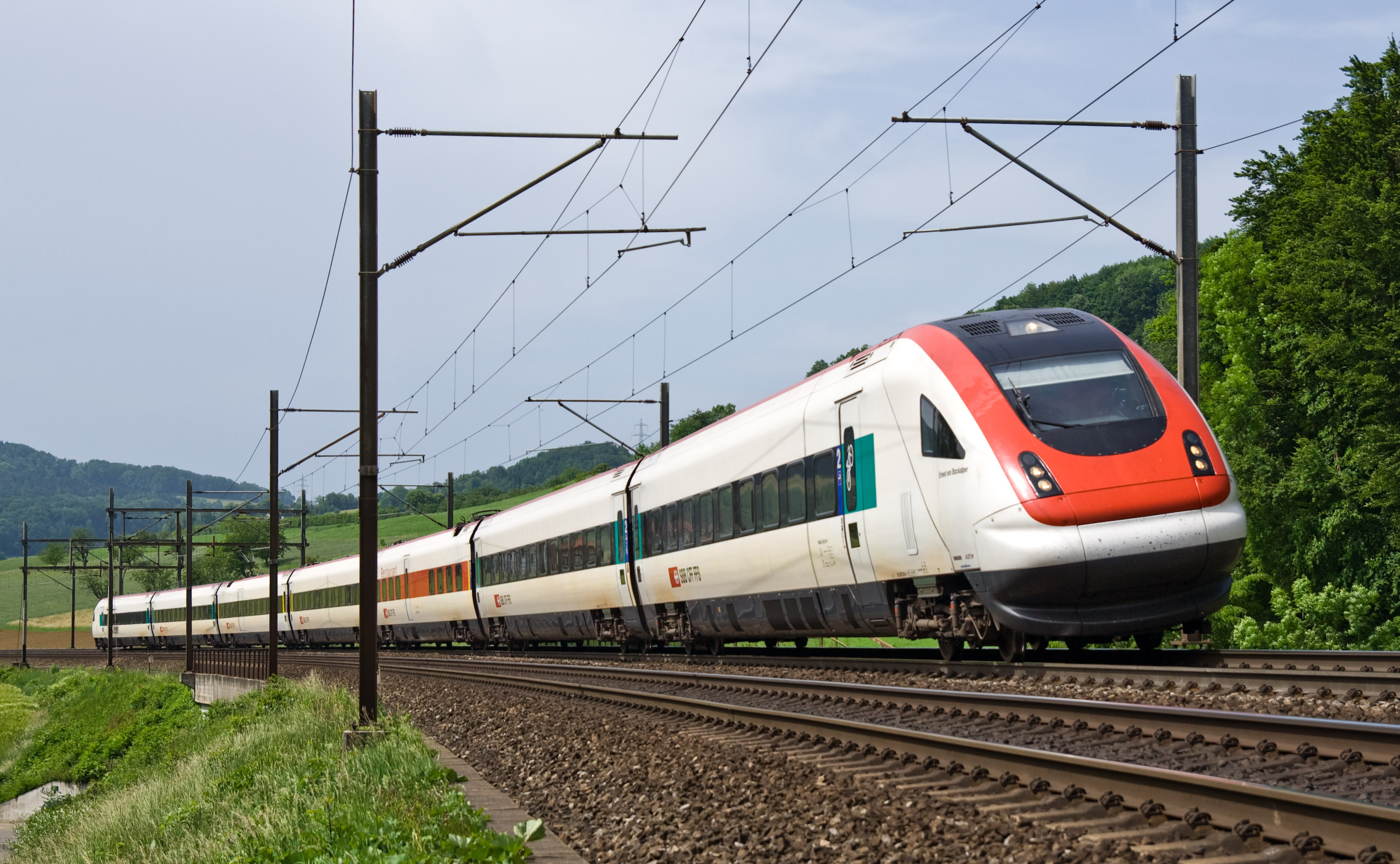
A Swiss SBB RABDe 500 on the Hauenstein railway line in May 2007

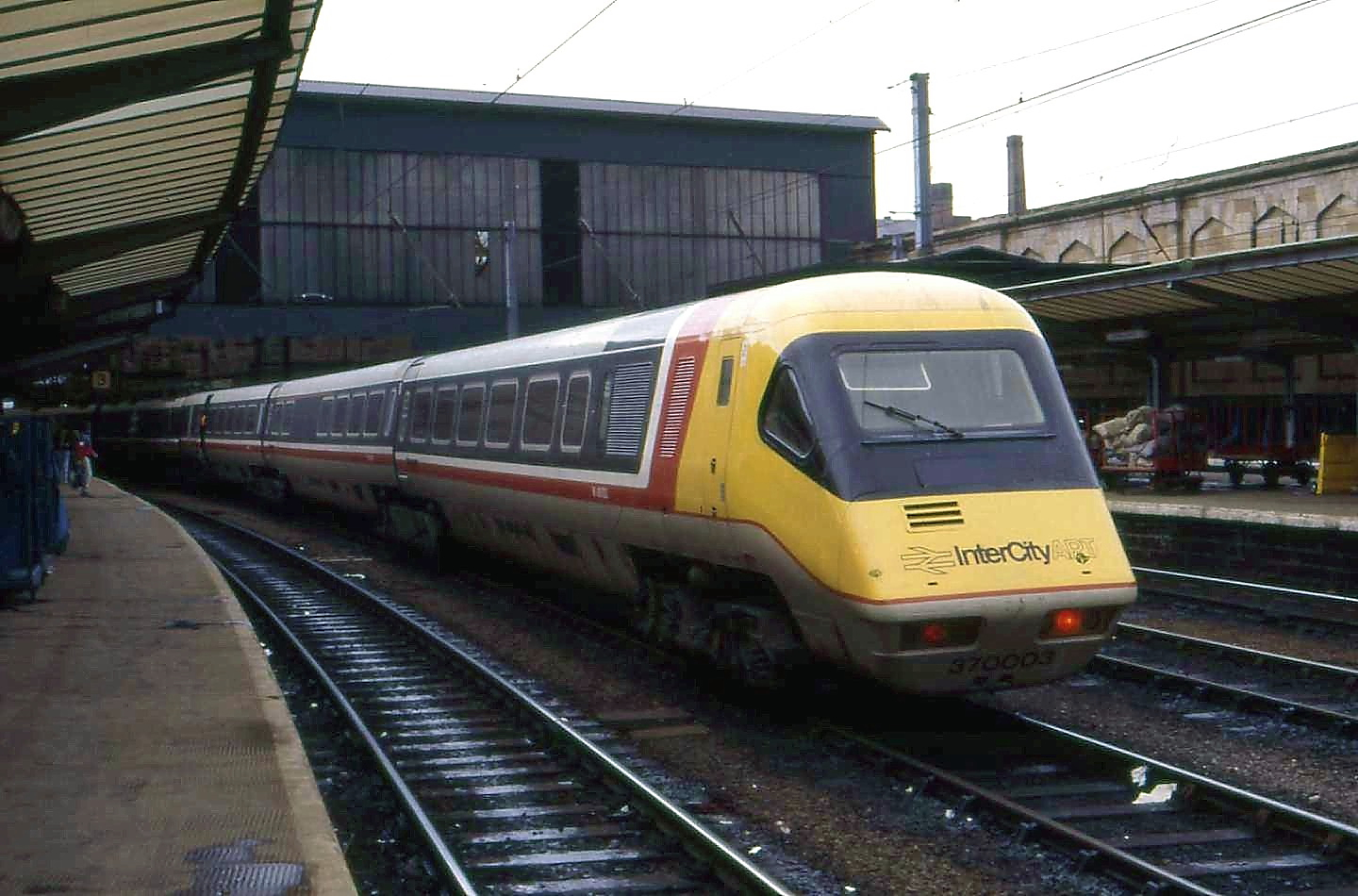
British Rail Class 370 (APT) passing Carlisle in 1984

A tilting train is a train or locomotive that has a mechanism enabling increased speed along regular rail tracks. When a train (or other vehicle) drives around a curve at high speed, it experiences centripetal force that pushes against objects inside it. This can cause packages to slide around or seated passengers to feel squashed by the outboard armrest, and standing passengers to lose their balance and fall over. The train can physically tilt on one side, eventually causing it to derail. Tilting trains are designed to counteract this by tilting the carriages towards the inside of the curve. The train may be specially constructed such that inertial forces cause the tilting (passive tilt), or it may have an automatic computer-controlled powered mechanism (active tilt).

The first passive tilting car design was built in the United States in 1937, and an improved version was built in 1939. The beginning of World War II ended development. Talgo introduced a version based on their articulated bogie design in 1950s, and this concept was used on a number of commercial services. Among these was the UAC TurboTrain, which was the first (albeit short-lived) tilting train to enter commercial service in 1968 in the US and Canada. Japan similarly experimented, from the late 1960s, through the 591 Series that developed into the highly successful Hitachi 381 series, that has been in service since 1973. In parallel, Fiat Ferroviaria produced the experimental Y 0160 in 1970, that would evolve into the Pendolino family, in 1976, and operated in 11 countries. All of these had problems with short curves like those in switchyards, where they tended to sway about. Also, because of the way the carriages always swung outward, they placed more weight on the outside of the curve, which limited their improvement in cornering speed to about 20%.

Starting in the late 1960s, British Rail also began experiments with its Advanced Passenger Train (APT) which pioneered the active-tilt concept, along with in-cab signaling, to permit High Speed Rail services on conventional tracks. The APT family used hydraulic rams on the bottoms of the carriages to tilt them, rotating them around their center point rather than swinging outward. This had the advantage of keeping the carriage centered over the bogies, which reduced load on the rails, and could be turned off when navigating switches. Due to lengthy political delays, the APT did not begin service testing until 1979, entering limited scheduled service in December 1981, the media describing the initial revenue run as both fifteen years late, and the queasy rider; the sets only briefly entering full revenue operation in 1985, before being withdrawn and the associated technologies sold to Alstom / Fiat Ferroviaria. By this time, the Canadian LRC design had become the first active tilting train to enter full commercial service, starting with Via Rail in 1981.

== Design ==
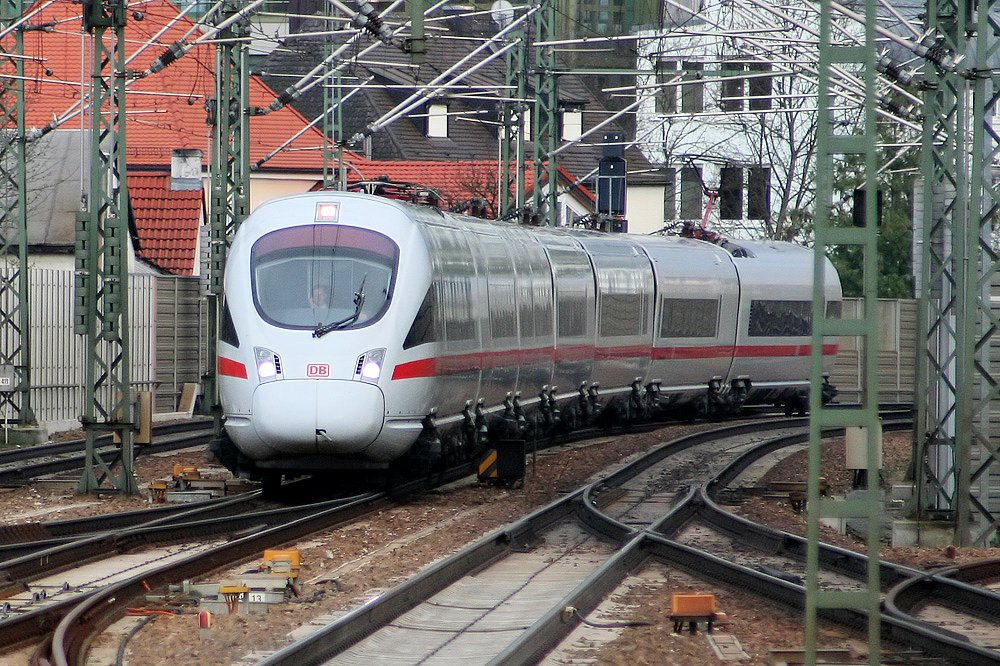
An ICE T (DB class 411) leaves a curve, showing cars tilted to different degrees

Aeroplanes and bicycles tilt inwards when cornering, but automobiles and trains cannot do this on their own. Vehicles with high centers of gravity rounding sharp curves at high speeds may topple over. To make their turns easier, the outer edge of a roadway of a high-speed highway or outer rail of a railway may be canted (raised) upward around the curve. The combination of tilt and centrifugal force combines to produce an effective acceleration that is down through the floor, reducing or eliminating any sideways component.

The particular angle of tilt ("superelevation") is determined by the intended vehicle speed—higher speeds require more banking. However, with a growing desire in the 1960s and 1970s to build high-speed rail networks, a problem arose: the amount of tilt appropriate for high-speed trains would be over-tilted for lower-speed local passenger and freight trains sharing the lines. Japan's early bullet train efforts of the 1960s avoided this problem by laying all-new lines as part of a re-gauging effort, and France's TGV followed the same pattern. Other operators did not have this luxury and were generally limited to much lower speeds.

Spain's national railway Renfe took a domestic invention, the Talgo, and developed it into a reliable high-speed train for a low-traffic-density railway. British Rail invested heavily in tilting-train technology to overcome the limitations of a rail network located in space-constrained built-up areas. Italy's Trenitalia and the Japan National Railways have used tilting technology to speed express trains on conventional tracks through mountainous terrain.

Tilting trains are meant to help reduce the effects of centrifugal force on the human body, but they can still cause nausea, a problem that was widely seen on early "passive" tilting trains that exactly balanced the outward force. The effect could be felt under maximum speed and tilt, when the combination of tilting outside view and lack of corresponding sideways force can be disconcerting to passengers, like that of a "thrill ride".

More limited and slower tilt could be achieved using active, or 'forced', tilting mechanisms. In trains adopting these mechanisms, tilt is initiated by computers, which 'force' train bodies to tilt at specific angles based on track information. This information could be stored on board or detected using a sensor at the front of the train or using automatic train stop beacons. The slight delay in reacting to this information leads to a short period of sideways force while the cars react. It was found that when the cars tilt just at the beginning of the curves instead of while they are making the turns, there was no motion sickness. Researchers have found that if the tilting motion is reduced to compensate for 80% or less of lateral apparent force, then passengers feel more secure. Also, motion sickness on tilting trains can be essentially eliminated by adjusting the timing of when the cars tilt as they enter and leave the curves.

A similar technology widely adopted across Asia and Oceania, known as controlled passive tilt, achieves a similar effect by using on-board computers to limit tilt, initiated using inertia (as in traditional passive tilt). Automatic train stop beacons are used to inform computers of the precise location of these trains and limit natural tilt to angles specified by track data.

=== High-speed trains ===
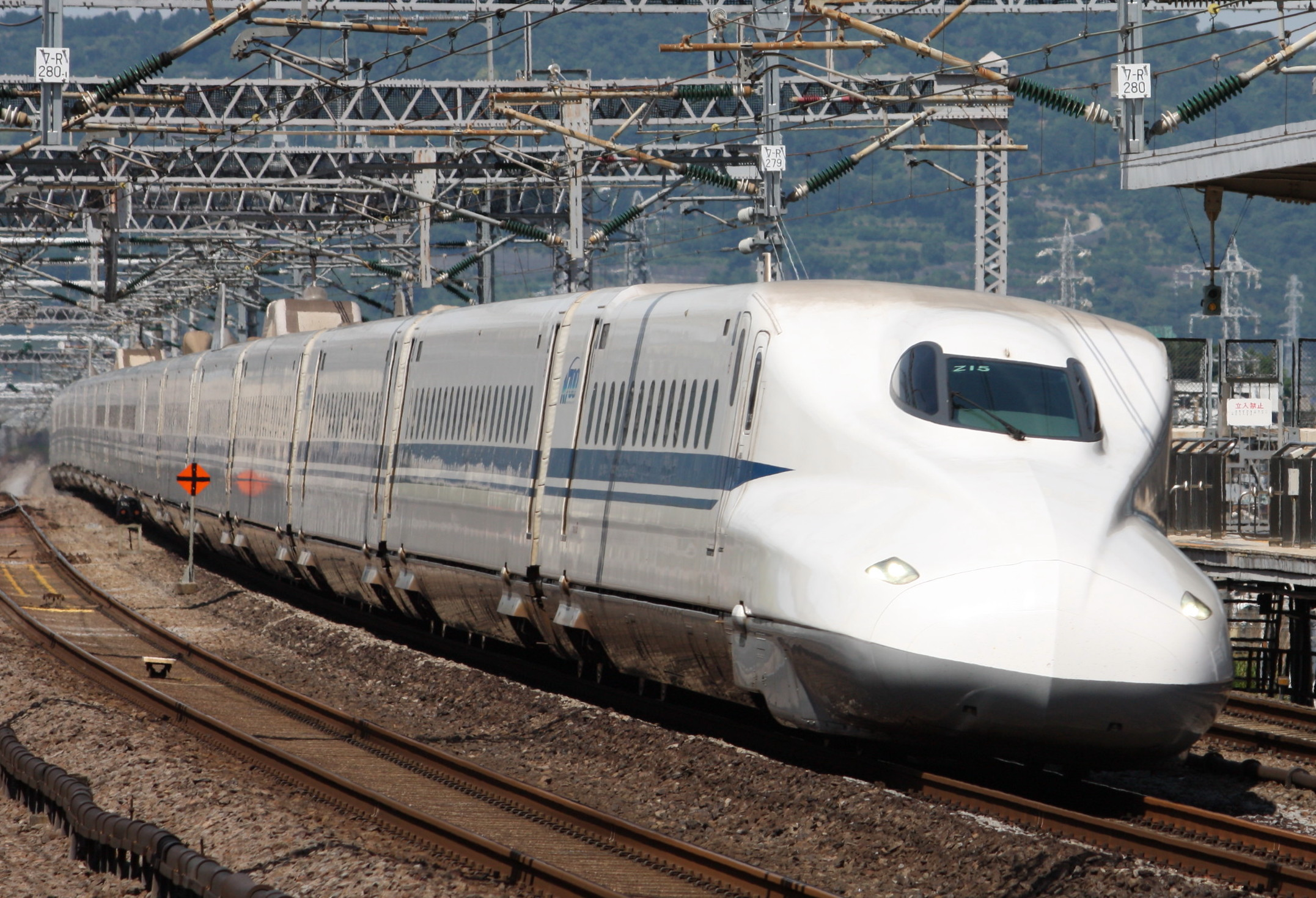
The JR N700 Series Shinkansen, the first tilting train on Japan's high speed network

A high-speed tilting train is a tilting train that operates at high speed, typically defined as by the European Union to include 200 km/h (124 mph) for upgraded track and 250 km/h (155 mph) or faster for new track.

Tilting trains operating at 200 km/h (124 mph) or more on upgraded track include the Acela and the Avelia Liberty in the US, the X 2000 in Sweden, the Pendolinos and Super Voyagers in the United Kingdom, the ICN in Switzerland and the ICE T and ICE TD in Germany (the latter being diesel powered).

Some older high-speed lines were built for lower line speeds (≤ 230 km/h (143 mph)); newer tilting trainsets can maintain higher speeds on them. For example, the Japanese N700 Series Shinkansen may tilt up to one degree on the Tōkaidō Shinkansen, allowing the trains to maintain 270 km/h (168 mph) even on 2,500 m (8,200 ft) radius curves that previously had a maximum speed of 255 km/h (158 mph).

Many high-speed trainsets are designed to operate on purpose-built high-speed lines and then continue their journeys on legacy lines, upgraded or not. Where the legacy lines justify it, a tilting train may operate at higher speeds on the latter, even if below the normal 200 km/h (124 mph) threshold, whilst operating at 250 km/h (155 mph) or faster, usually with tilt disabled, on the high speed lines.

== History ==
=== Pendulum car ===
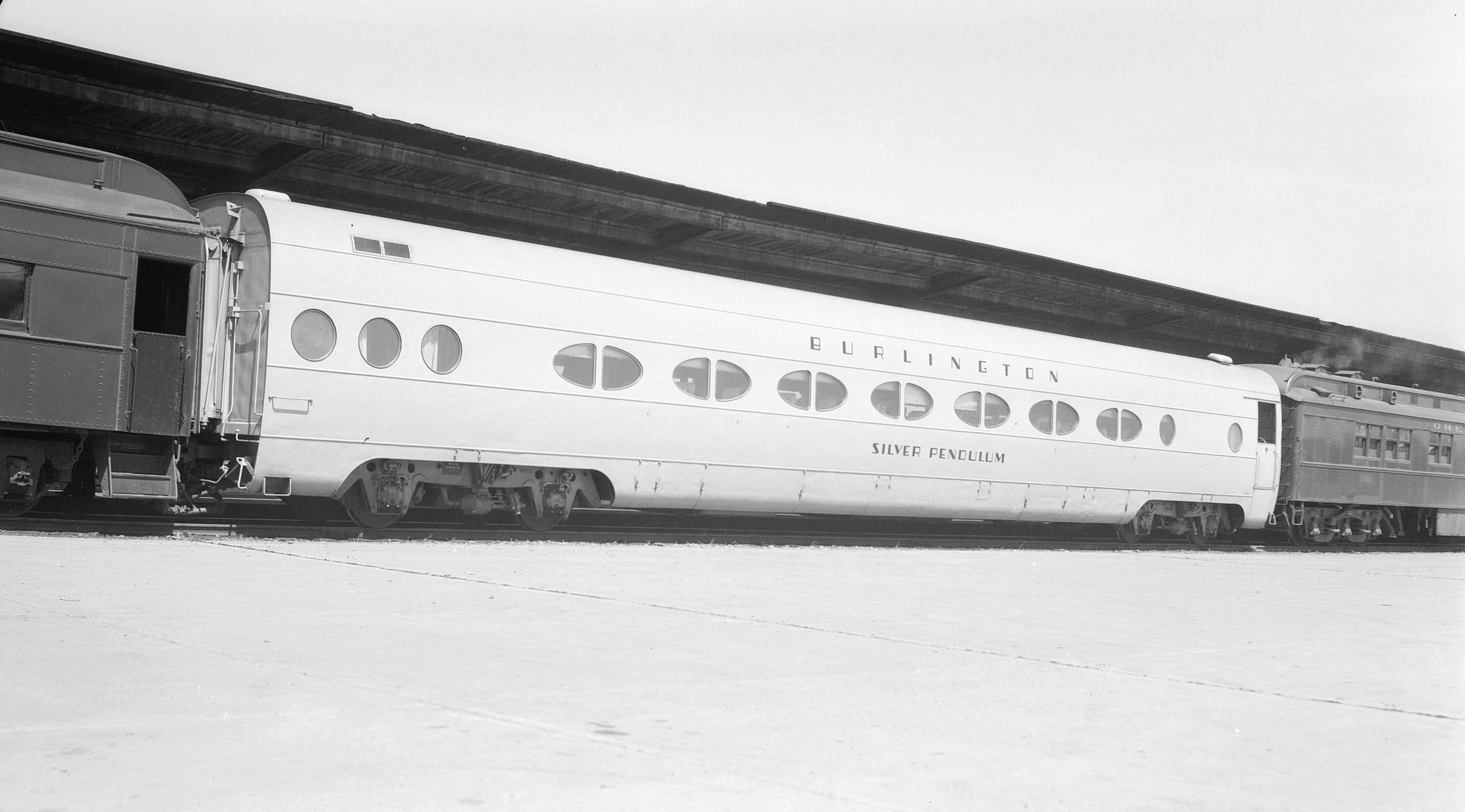
CBQ No. 6000, one of three experimental Pendulum cars, at Vancouver in the 1940s

The first experimental tilting train concept was the pendulum-suspension "chair" cars designed by the Pacific Railway Equipment Company. The first prototype, with an articulated bogie system, was built in 1937 and tested on the Atchison, Topeka and Santa Fe Railway that year. The company built another three pre-production models in 1939, using more conventional fore-and-aft bogies, and these saw some use with the San Diegan, among others. Mounted on high springs, the car tilted inwards on curves to counterbalance the cant deficiency with the induced centrifugal force. The opening of World War II prevented any immediate orders, and the concept was not revived in the post-war era.

=== SNCF experiment ===
In 1956, SNCF experimented with a self-propelled pendulum car, which also relied on centrifugal force. This experiment demonstrated the need for an active suspension system to tilt the coach bodies.

=== Talgo Pendular ===
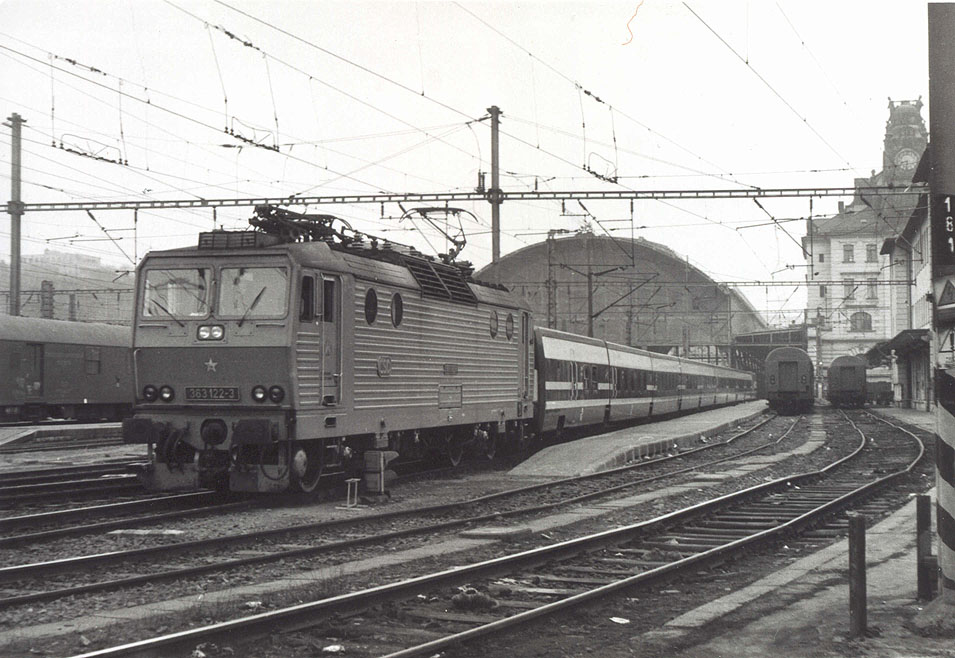
Talgo Pendular in Prague, 1993

The Spanish Talgo company had introduced the first widely successful shared-bogie system, which allowed cars to be connected end-to-end using a single bogie instead of each car having its own bogies at either end. This design saves weight and can reduce rail wear.

In the early 1950s, the Spanish National Railway, Renfe, experimented with passenger cars that combined the Talgo bogie with a new passive tilting system. This system used a large A-frame connected to the centre of the bogie that was as high as the cars. At the top of the A was a bearing system that the cars attached to, and a spring and damping system to smooth its motion. Because the cars were connected at this high point, they could swing to either side around the bearing axis, and this caused them to naturally pendulum outward on curves.

The first test of a Talgo in the United States was the John Quincy Adams with Fairbanks-Morse P-12-42 tested by the New York, New Haven & Hartford Railroad in 1957–1958. Due to technical troubles and the precarious financial state of the New Haven railroad, the trainset was stored. The idea caught the interest of the Chesapeake & Ohio Railway, who began development of what would become the UAC TurboTrain using the same system. The TurboTrain entered service in the US and Canada in 1968.

The first successful European tilting train design was the Talgo in Spain, developed in the 1970s as a lightweight, fast train using passive tilt. Renfe, adopted the system widely, but was restricted to the Iberian peninsula initially.

The first full commercial application of passive tilting trains appeared in early 1980s with the Talgo Pendular. Talgo is currently in its 21st generation of production. Talgo trains are in service in various parts of Europe, and built under licence in Latin America and Asia. In North America, Amtrak uses Talgo trains in its Cascades service in the Northwest.

The first Talgo tilting series were the "pendular" ones from 400 series onwards.

=== UAC TurboTrain ===
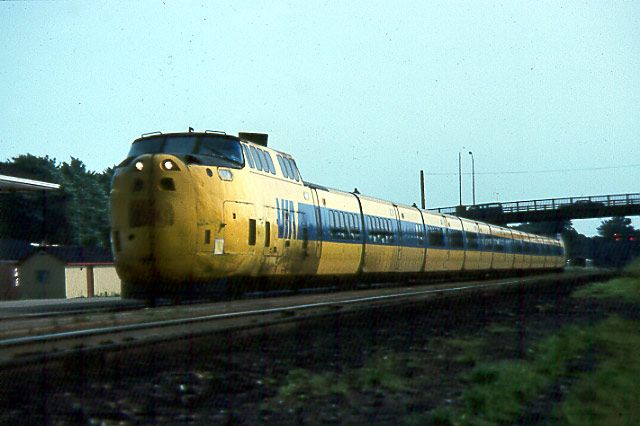
The UAC TurboTrain remained in service in Canada into the 1980s, in Via Rail livery

The first tilting train to enter into regular service in North America was the UAC TurboTrain, used by Canadian National in 1968. Some figures have considered it to be the first tilting train in service in the world. It provided daily service between Montreal and Toronto at speeds of 160 km/h (99 mph), until it was replaced by Bombardier LRC trains in 1982, reaching the maximum speed of 225 km/h (140 mph) during Canadian trials. TurboTrains were also operated by Amtrak between Boston and New York. The UAC Turbos had a passive tilt mechanism based on a four-bar arrangement, and they inspired the second generation of Talgo trains.

=== Pendolino ===
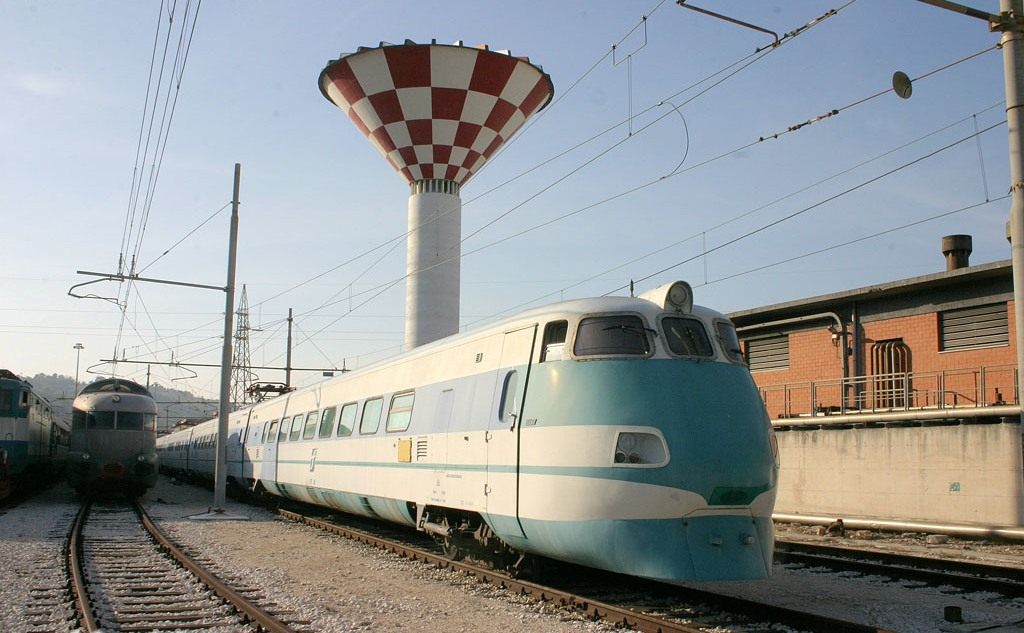
ETR 401 near Ancona

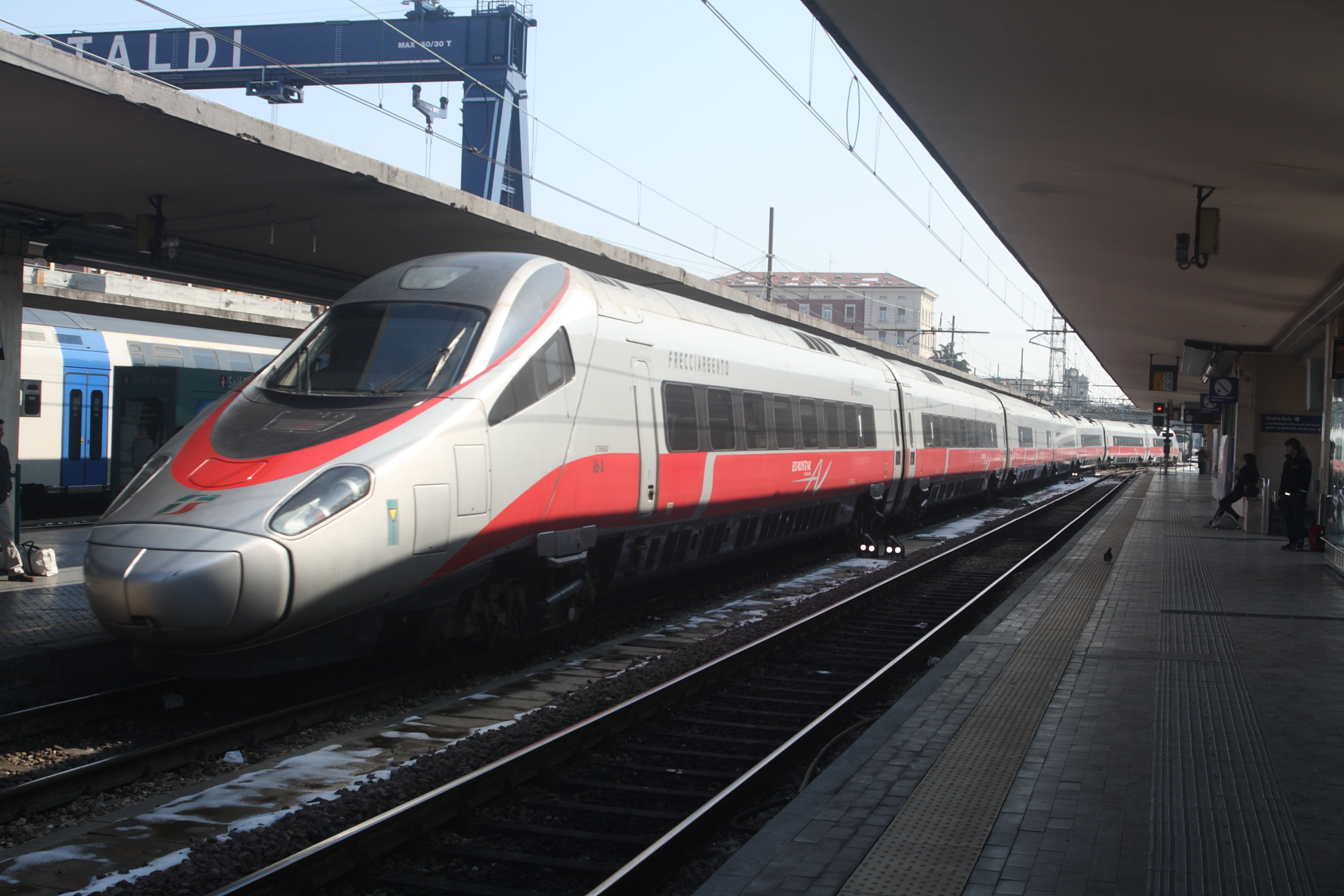
ETR 600, in service since 2006

In Italy, the studies for a tilting train started in the mid 1960s and the concept was patented in 1967 by two engineers of Fiat railway materials, Franco di Maio and Luigi Santanera. A number of prototypes were built and tested, including an automotrice (self-propelled) derived from ALn 668, the ALn 668 1999 diesel car, provided with tilting seats to test the effects of active tilting technologies. The first working prototype using a tilting carbody was ETR Y 0160, an electrically powered car launched by FIAT in 1969. This was the first to be christened Pendolino.

This design led to the construction of an entire EMU in 1975, the ETR 401, built in two units by FIAT. One was put into public service on 2 July 1976 on the Rome-Ancona (later extended to Rimini) line, operated by Italian State Railways. Between Roma and Ancona (km. 295), the train took 2 hours 50 minutes, while ordinary trains took 3 hours 30 minutes. The train had four cars and was mostly considered a travelling laboratory for the new technology. Initially the ETR 401 was conceived as the first of a series of four trains, but the government lost interest to the project because of financial problems, and the project was temporarily interrupted, as the service in 1983. The train was used in demonstration campaigns to foreign countries like Germany, Switzerland, Czechoslovakia and Yugoslavia. A second unit was built for service to the wide-gauge Renfe Spanish lines in 1977, under the nickname of Platanito. The service didn't last of long, because problems with Spanish tracks made Platanito of little use.

New interest by the Italian government in the project in the mid 1980s, and the introduction of new technologies, led to the revision of the project with the ETR 401 with electronic systems, that led to the introduction of the slightly more advanced ETR 450, the first Pendolino to enter regular service in the world. Characterized by an 8-car configuration, and a maximum tilt reduced to 8° from the 10° of the ETR 401, for safety and comfort reasons, ETR 450 could run the Rome-Milan line in under four hours, at speeds up to 250 km/h (160 mph). Passenger numbers increased from 220,000 in 1988 to 2.2 million in 1993.

In 1989, the old technologies and concepts of some parts of the ETR 450, and the introduction of new technologies in traction, led to the development of the next generation. The result was the ETR 460, styled by Giorgetto Giugiaro, a train that began service in 1996. Though plagued by technical problems, the ETR 460 introduced several innovations, such as more powerful AC asynchronous motors. The pistons actuating the tilting action were placed in the bogie instead of on the carbody sides: this permitted the reorganisation of the vestibules and passenger compartment areas, improving comfort. The bogie-to-body connection is extremely simple and easy to build, with maintenance advantages.

ETR 460 keeps axle load to an extremely low level (14.5 ton/axle), to allow the train to negotiate curves up to 35% faster than conventional Intercity trains (locomotive plus coaches). The body, which exploits large aluminium extrusion technology, has substantial modularity and allows for extremely low axle weight, whilst fully respecting the highest safety standards, and allows the best exploitation of the space with different loading gauges.

ETR 460 was built in only 10 units. Improved versions include ETR 470 for the Italo-Swiss Cisalpino company, the ETR 460 France, later called as ETR 463, used by FS to the route Milan Lione, and the ETR 480, used by Trenitalia under AC-powered Italian high speed lines. A total of 34 EMUs of the ETR 460/470/480 series were built for FS.

The development of the Pendolino technology continued in the Italian factories of Alstom and the next generation, the New Pendolino, was delivered to Trenitalia and Cisalpino as the ETR 600 and the ETR 610 from 2006.

Italian Pendolinos and their derivatives still represent the most popular solution for active tilting in passenger trains. The technology still in use today is almost the same developed by Fiat Ferroviaria in the 1960s-70s.

The British version of the Pendolino, the British Rail Class 390, is a 225 km/h (140 mph) electric tilting train operated by Avanti West Coast. It runs on the West Coast Main Line (London Euston to Glasgow Central, Liverpool Lime Street and Manchester Piccadilly). Class 390s commenced operation in 2001 with only one being in a major derailment. Due to signalling constraints, Class 390s are limited to 201 km/h (125 mph) in regular service.

=== Japanese designs ===
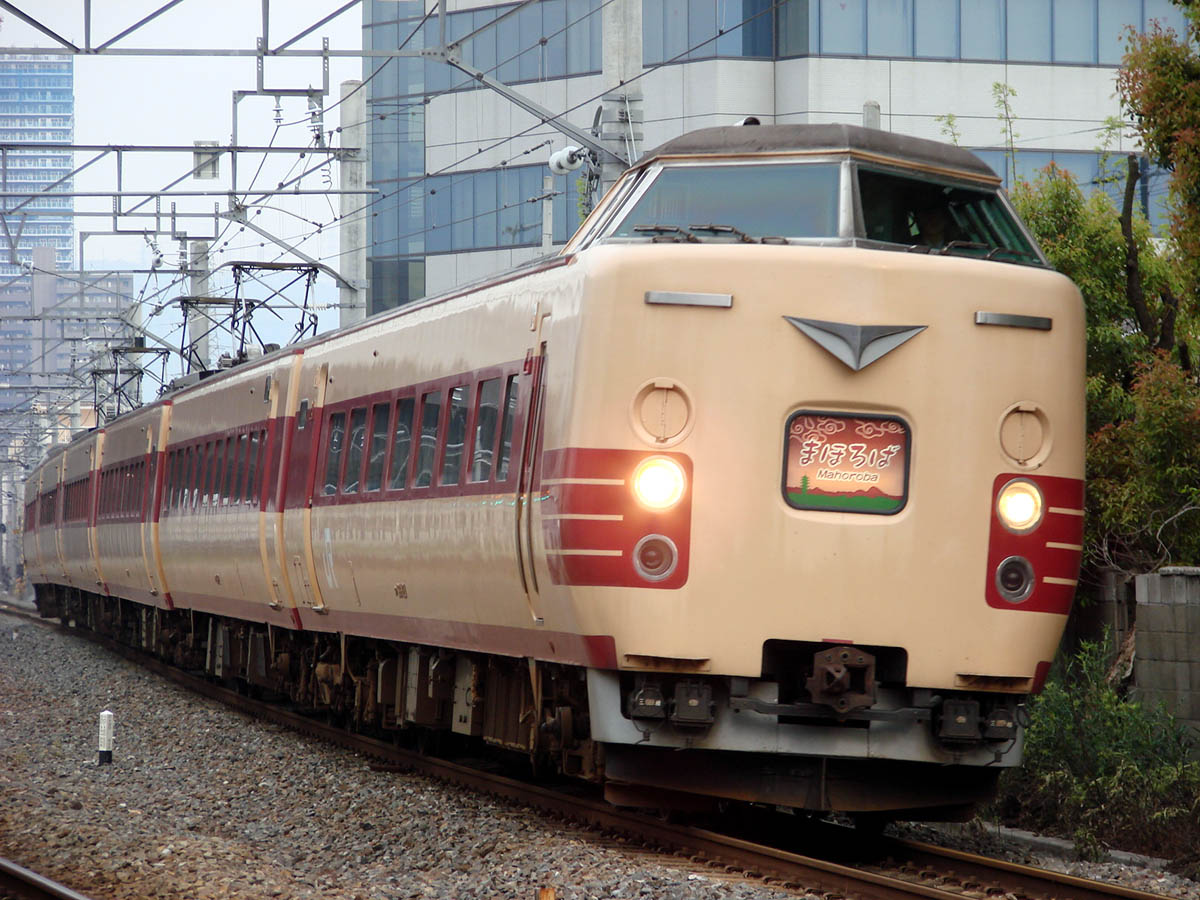
The 381 series, the first tilting EMU to enter regular service globally

Japan was an early adopter of tilting trains and continues to use them on many express services. Due to the slow and twisty nature of its conventional-speed, narrow gauge network, tilting trains were introduced as a way to speed up services on its congested main lines. The interurban Odakyu Electric Railway began Japan's first experiments in tilting technology in the 1960s by fitting pneumatic bogies to their electric railcars, while the Japanese National Railways pioneered their form of passive-tilt technology on their experimental 591 series EMU with commercial express services on mountain lines in mind. The 381 series was the first commercial tilting EMU in Asia, entering service in 1973 on the Shinano limited express services that operated on the hilly Chūō Main Line. The sets remained in operation until June 2024, when the last regularly scheduled trains ended on the Yakumo service.

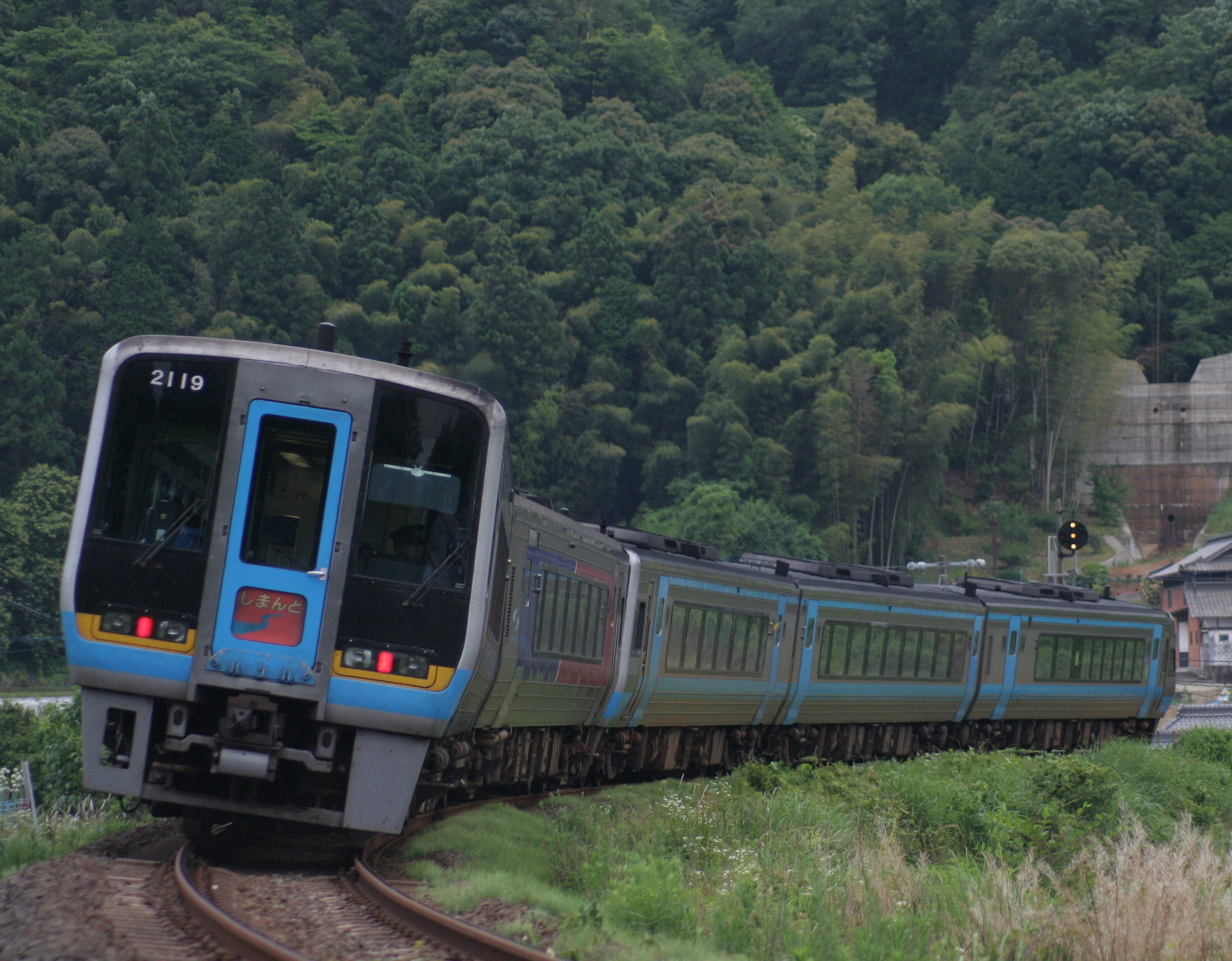
The JR Shikoku 2000 series DMU negotiating a tight curve on Shikoku's mountainous railway network

During the final years of the Japanese National Railways, experimentation on mechanically-regulated passive tilt—a combination known as 'controlled passive tilt' (制御付き自然振子式), where tilt is initiated passively but controlled (and slowed) by computers through mechanical active suspension—culminated post-privatisation with the 2000 series DMU, built for JR Shikoku and introduced on the Shiokaze and Nanpū limited express services in 1990. With problems of ride nausea and track wear alleviated, the benefits of tilting trains on the country's mountainous Cape gauge (1,067mm) railway system soon became apparent and since then these 'semi-active' tilting trains have seen widespread use on limited-express trains throughout the archipelago. Particularly well-known diesel and electric examples of this generation of tilting trains include JR Hokkaido's KiHa 281 series, JR East's E351 series, JR Central's 383 series, JR Shikoku's 8000 series, and JR Kyushu's 885 series.

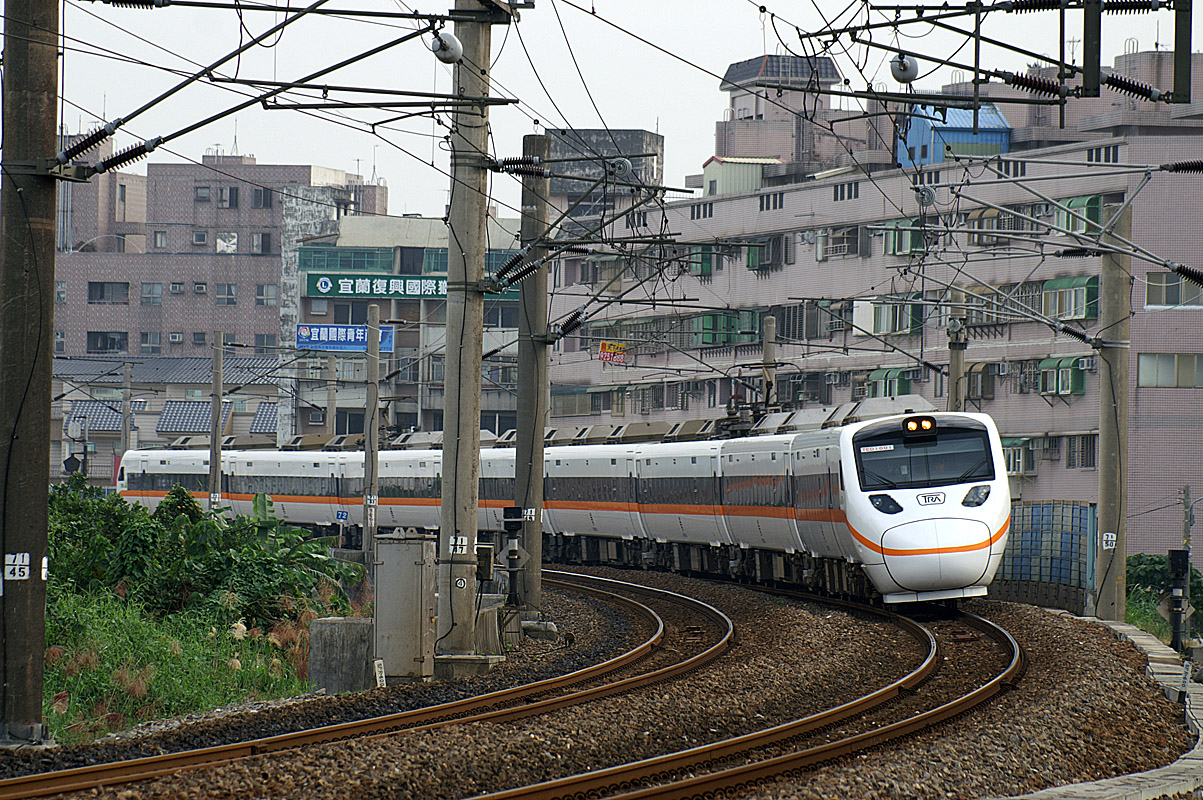
The Taiwanese TEMU1000 Series, based on the JR Kyushu 885 Series

This generation of designs has seen some popularity overseas—the 8000 series serves as the basis of the Electric Tilt Train built for Queensland Rail's Cape Gauge network. The 885 series, built as part of the Hitachi A-train family, serves as the basis of the Taiwanese TEMU1000 series tilting EMU for Taroko Express services, and some non-tilting variants including the British Rail Class 395 and British Rail Class 801.

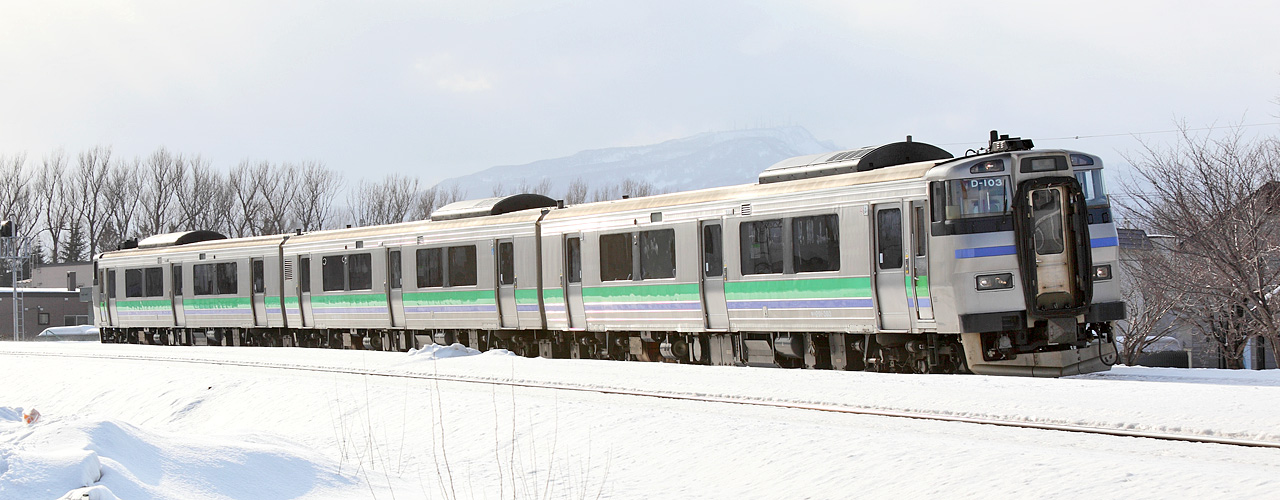
The KiHa 201 DMU, a unique application of active suspension technology to a commuter train

Later developments in pneumatic active suspension—based on the DB Class 403 (1973) built decades earlier—created a generation of trains with more limited tilt (around 2°) but are more economical to build and easier to maintain. The experimental 300X built in 1995 developed into the N700 series, the first revenue-earning tilting Shinkansen unit in 2007. Applications to Shinkansen lines—which would not have benefitted greatly with mechanical tilting mechanisms due to their already shallow curves that allow high speeds—allowed for greater ride comfort, less track wear and slightly higher speeds leading to increased frequency. The simplicity of this technology made it possible for smaller private operators to introduce tilting trains, such as the Odakyu 50000 series VSE, a luxurious sightseeing express train with active suspension introduced not to increase speeds but to enhance ride comfort; and even cheap enough to be applied to commuter stock, such as JR Hokkaido's KiHa 201 series, which improved speeds and frequencies on Sapporo's partly non-electrified suburban railway system. This is also one of the only applications of tilting technology on 'metro-style' commuter trains to date.. More modern and more numerous examples of active suspension and pneumatic tilting trains, include the 'limited express' EMUs E353 series for JR East.

=== German designs ===
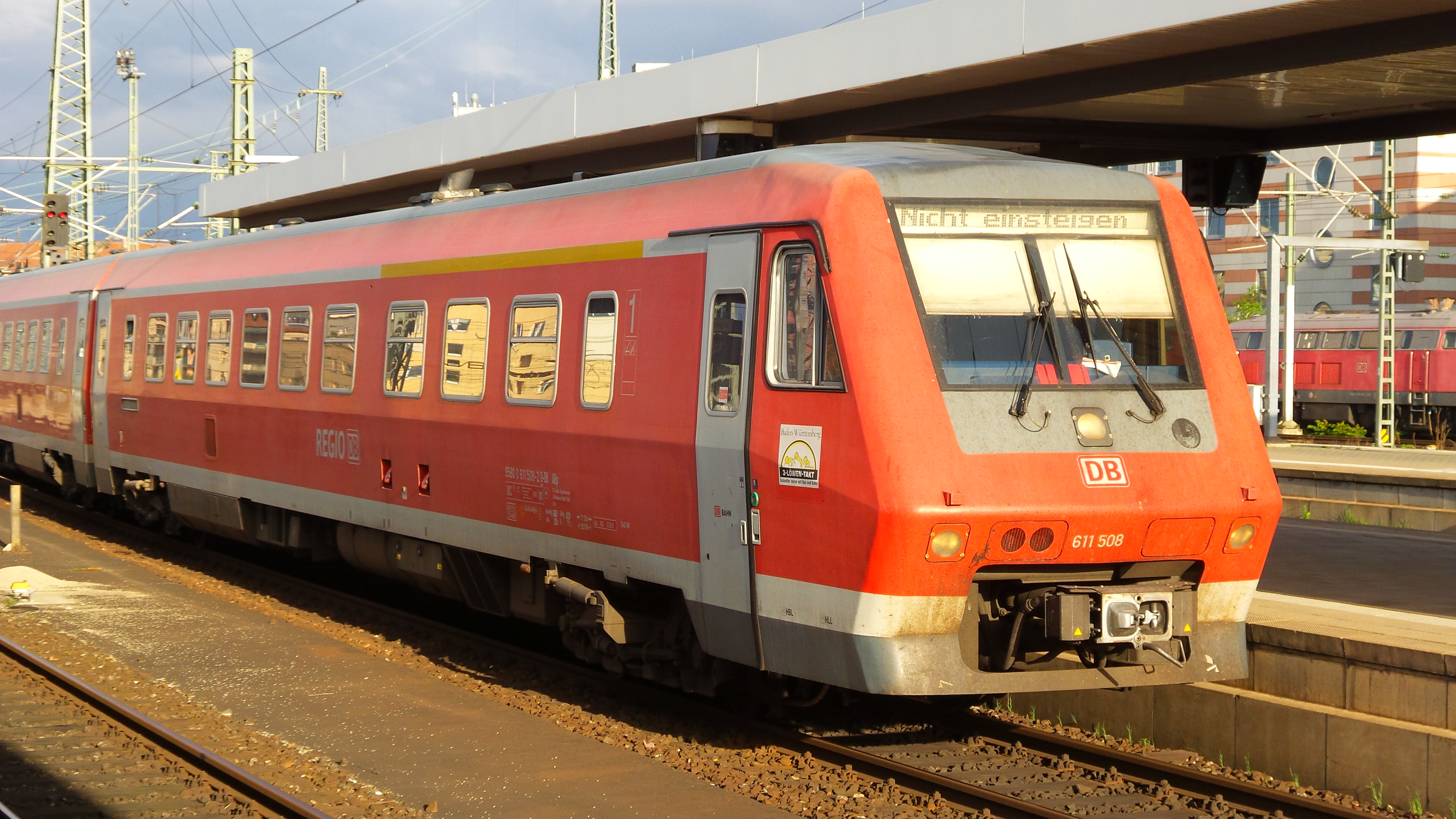
DB DMUs 611 508 in Nuremberg

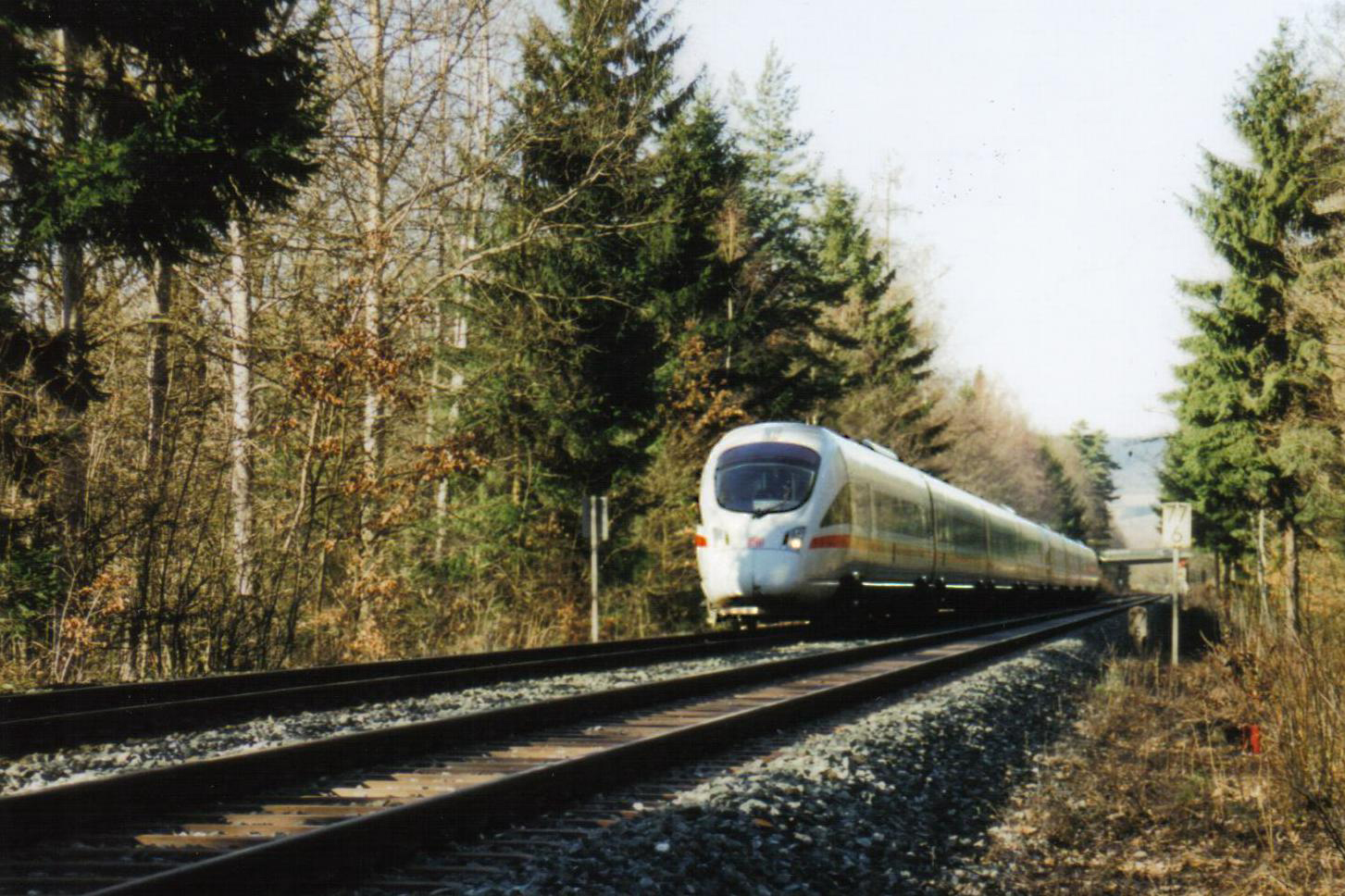
An ICE TD in regular service in 2002

Deutsche Bundesbahn started tests with tilting trains in Germany with its Class 634 in 1967 when some Class 624 DMUs were equipped with passive tilting systems. As the passengers experienced motion sickness, the tilting technology was disabled and later removed. The tests continued with the prototypes of the following Class 614 units, but due to the again unsatisfying results the serial types were delivered without tilting system.

Another early train with tilting technology was Deutsche Bundesbahn's Class 403 (today this number is used by ICE 3) high speed EMU. Following its InterCity services until 1979, it was also used for airport transfers between Düsseldorf and Frankfurt (see also: AiRail Service). Class 403 was able to tilt 4°, but the fixed pantographs limited this to 2°. Shortly after the train had gone into service, the tilting technology was disabled as many passengers experienced motion sickness because the pivotal point was too low.

The next attempt was made with DMUs and the proven Italian hydraulic active tilting system. Between 1988 and 1990, DB commissioned 20 Class 610 units for fast regional traffic. This time the results were quite satisfying and allowed a significant reduction of running times. The Class 610 sets was followed by the Class 611, which basically was built for the same purpose (fast regional traffic with up to 160 km/h (99 mph) on twisting non-electrified lines). The Class 611's tilting system was electric, with a maximum 8° tilt, based on military technology from the Leopard tank. After entering service in 1996, this 50-unit class experienced problems both with the newly developed tilting system as well as chassis and axles, and was judged unsuccessful. The tilting system was out of service until 2006, when hardened axles and system updates solved the problems. In consideration of these problems DB ordered a full re-engineering, resulting in the development of Class 612. Starting in 1998, a total of 192 units were commissioned by DB. The tilting system proved to be reliable. In 2004, cracks were detected in a number of wheel sets, and again wheels and axles had to be replaced. Today Class 612 is back to tilting operation and forms the backbone of DB's fast regional service on non-electrified lines. Additional units were sold to Croatia, where they are used for InterCity services.

In 1999 DB was able to use tilting technology for its InterCityExpress services, when with class 411 and 415 an electric high-speed tilting train was commissioned. While classes 401 to 403 (without tilting technology) were to cover the newly built or modernized high speed lines at up to 300 km/h (186 mph) (ICE 3 Class 403), Classes 411 and 415 with maximum speed of 230 km/h (143 mph) were designed for older twisting main lines. A total of 60 Class 411 and 11 Class 415 (shorter version) have been built so far. Both classes worked reliably until late 2008 when cracks were found on an axle during a routine check. The tilting mechanism has been switched off since 23 October 2008, and the maintenance intervals were drastically reduced which led to major service disruptions.

Much of the technical layout is derived from the ICE 3. Austria's ÖBB has purchased three units in 2007, operating them jointly with DB for services from Germany to Austria. Even though DB assigned the name ICE-T to class 411/415, the T originally did not stand for tilting but for Triebwagen (self-propelled car), as DB's marketing department at first deemed the top speed too low for assignment of the InterCityExpress brand and therefore planned to refer to this class as IC-T (InterCity-Triebwagen).

Rather luckless was Class 411/415's adaptation for diesel services. In 2001, a total of 20 units were commissioned for use on the Dresden–Munich line, but these class 605 (ICE-TD) units experienced trouble from the start. After breaking an axle in 2002, all remaining 19 units (one fell off a working platform) were taken out of service. Even though one year later the trains were admitted to service again, DB judged their operation to be overly expensive. In 2006, those trains were used for amplifier trains and from 2008 to 2017, they ran on the Hamburg–Copenhagen route. Since 2018 and 2021, two units are in operation as the advanced TrainLab test train.

=== Light, Rapid, Comfortable ===
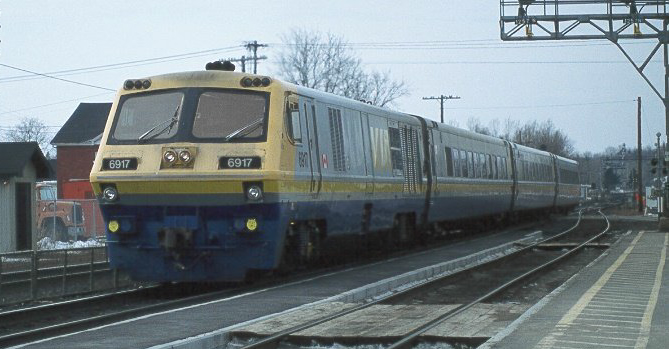
Via Rail LRC

In 1966, a consortium of Canadian industrial firms began considering a conventionally-powered competitor to the TurboTrain, eventually emerging as the LRC (Light, Rapid, Comfortable) in the early 1970s. This design also used an active-tilt system, but one of very different form than the APT. The carriages rode on two C-shaped channels mounted across the top of the bogies. Tilt was accomplished by rams that pushed the bottom of the carriage side to side along these channels.

Amtrak experimented with the LRC in 1980, but retired it seven years later. In Canada, it entered service in 1981, beating the APT into service and becoming the first operational active-tilt system. The LRC carriages remain in use today, although the tilt mechanisms are being removed to reduce weight and maintenance costs.

Bombardier has since used updated versions of the LRC carriages for Amtrak's Acela, the third generation of tilting ICE, the new generation of fast British trains (Super Voyager) and the experimental JetTrain.

=== Advanced Passenger Train ===
The Advanced Passenger Train (APT) was initially an experimental project by British Rail, with the train entering limited service in December 1981. Although eventually abandoned, the train was the pioneer of active tilt to negotiate tight curves at higher speeds than previous passive tilting trains. In the 1970s and 1980s, British Rail wanted an advanced fast train to negotiate Britain's twisting and winding Victorian-era rail system. Conventional trains were limited in speed due to the curvature of the network.

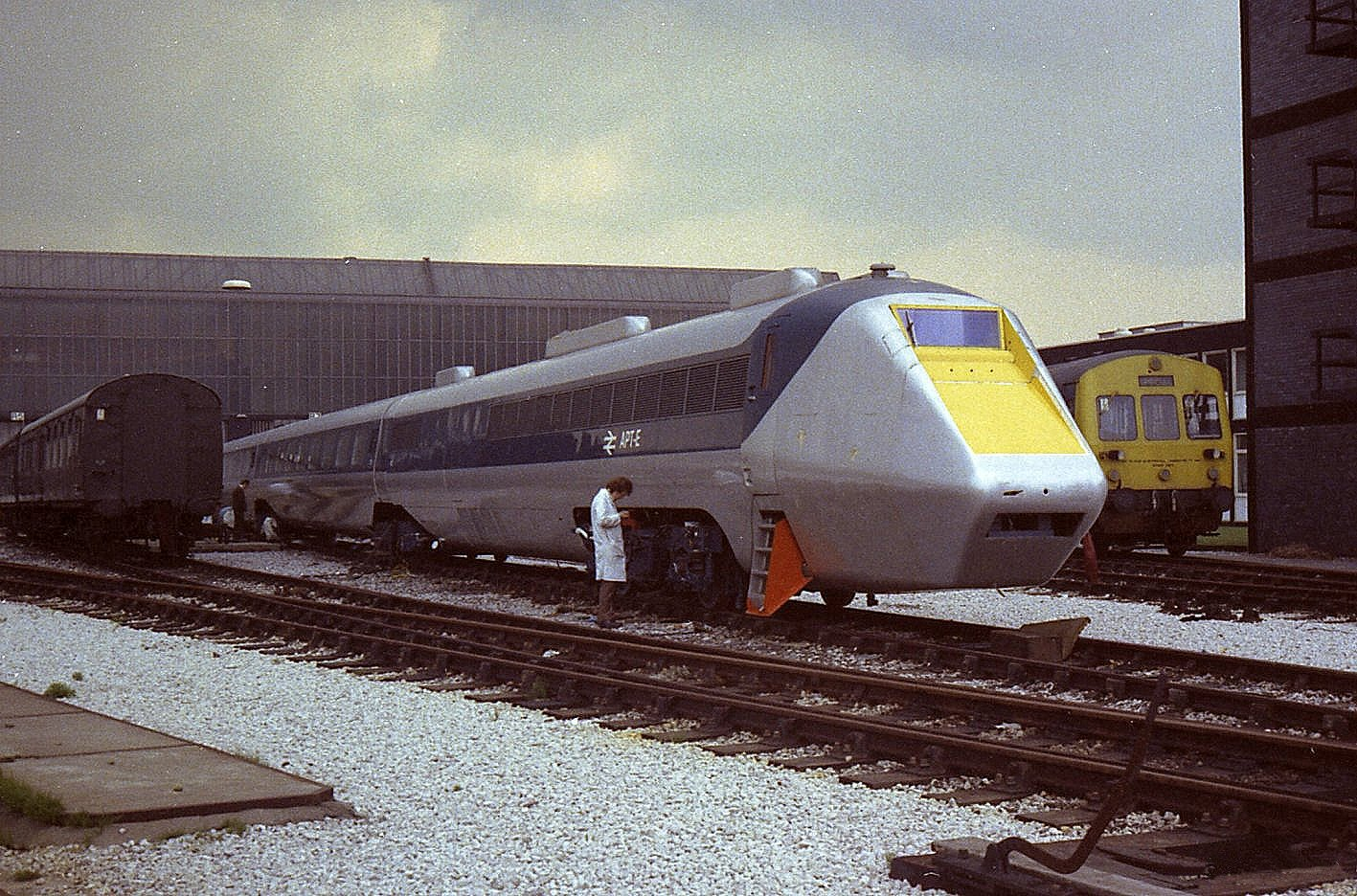
APT-E, in the Derby RTC sidings, 1972

Engineers at the research division, opened in 1964, had done fundamental work on vehicle dynamics, with the APT to a degree an extension of this. The existing Chief Mechanical and Electrical Engineers department was overlooked by the new project, creating resentment with its engineers. The work included experimentation with aluminium bodies, turbines, suspension and bogies, in cab signalling, automatic train protection, and active tilt.

The APT-E (E for experimental) was powered by gas turbines; the APT-P (P for prototype) was electric. With no tilting, the train was developed to break the British rail speed record. Tilting trains using passive tilt were not new, but it was uncommon and not widely implemented. The engineers decided that active tilt was the key to negotiating curves at much higher speeds.

The train had hydro-dynamic brakes and lightweight articulated bodies, with two power cars in the centre of the train. When the prototypes were built, worked and proven, the engineering development team was disbanded and the trains handed over to British Rail's in-house engineering department to build. The developing engineers moved on to different fields while British Rail engineered the train into a production model. The BR engineers, who had little to no involvement in the development of the train, changed some of the prime and proven engineering aspects. For example, they changed the active tilt mechanism to pneumatic, rather than the well-developed and proven hydraulics.

The trains were introduced in 1981, but almost immediately taken out of service. During initial tests, some passengers complained of being nauseous due to the tilting motion. Subsequently, it was learned that this could be prevented by reducing the tilt slightly, so that there was still some sensation of cornering. The APT-P trains were quietly reintroduced to service in mid-1984 and ran regularly for a year, the teething problems having been corrected. However, under an in-house engineering management who felt slighted and by-passed in a project they had not developed, there was no political or managerial will to continue the project by building the projected APT-S production vehicles in numbers. Despite being an eventual success, the project was scrapped by British Rail in 1986, more for political reasons than technical.

Much of the technology developed for the power cars was subsequently used in the InterCity 225 Class 91 locomotives and Mark 4 carriages which were designed to be retrofitted with tilting equipment, which run on the East Coast Main Line route from London to Leeds and Edinburgh.

=== X 2000 ===
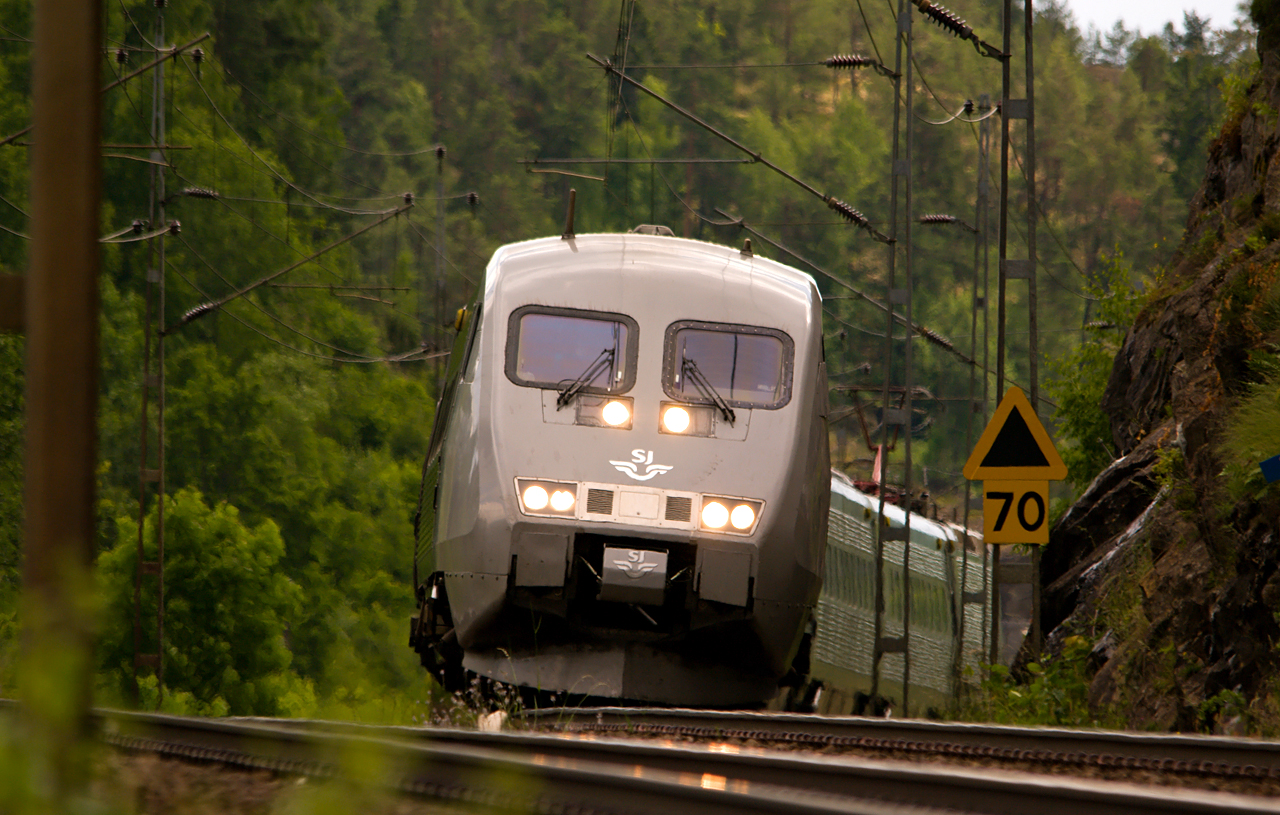
The Swedish X2 at Graversfors

In 1990, Swedish Railways (SJ AB) introduced a high-speed service called X 2000. The train uses an active tilting system, enabling higher speeds of 200 km/h (125 mph) on standard track. The train was also used in Norway and Denmark, but later the train was removed from service in Norway with being replaced with the new SJ 3000 high-speed trains. The X2000 was a collaborative project by Kalmar Verkstad, SJ and ASEA. The X 2000 has been tested in US, Canada, and Australia, and was used in inter-city services between China and Hong Kong as a Guangzhou–Kowloon through train from 1998 until 2007.

=== TGV Pendulaire ===
In 1998, SNCF bowed to political pressure (the tilt-train was a credible threat to the TGV dedicated high-speed line network) and put in service an experimental TGV pendulaire. Only the passenger trailers were tilting while the two heavy power cars kept non-tilting bogies. Following the test program, it was converted back to a TGV-PSE train.

=== InterCity Neigezug ===
Switzerland got its first tilting train ever in its territory (discounting the Cisalpino, which entered Switzerland in 1996) on 28 May 2000. The ICN (InterCity Neigezug, or InterCity Tilting Train) was made by Bombardier, including a tilting-system designed by SIG (today ALSTOM). It began service on the line from Geneva via Biel/Bienne and Zürich to St Gallen. It was a major carrier in the national exhibition Expo.02.

=== Bombardier Super Voyager ===
Forty-four diesel-electric powered Class 221 Super Voyagers were ordered by Virgin CrossCountry to operate in tilt mode on the West Coast Main Line and between Oxford and Banbury. After the fleet was split between Arriva CrossCountry and Virgin Trains West Coast in 2007, the former disabled and later removed the tilting equipment from its Class 221s.

=== Tilting Train Express ===
The Tilting Train Express (TTX) or Hanvit 200 is a prototype six-car experimental tilting train developed and built in South Korea. Revealed in 2007, it had multiple test runs, including one which recorded a maximum speed of 223 km/h. However, no production units were made as it was determined that it would be less costly to straighten existing trackage and banking the rails. It has done further test runs in 2014, however, to test the LTE-R system.

== Technology ==
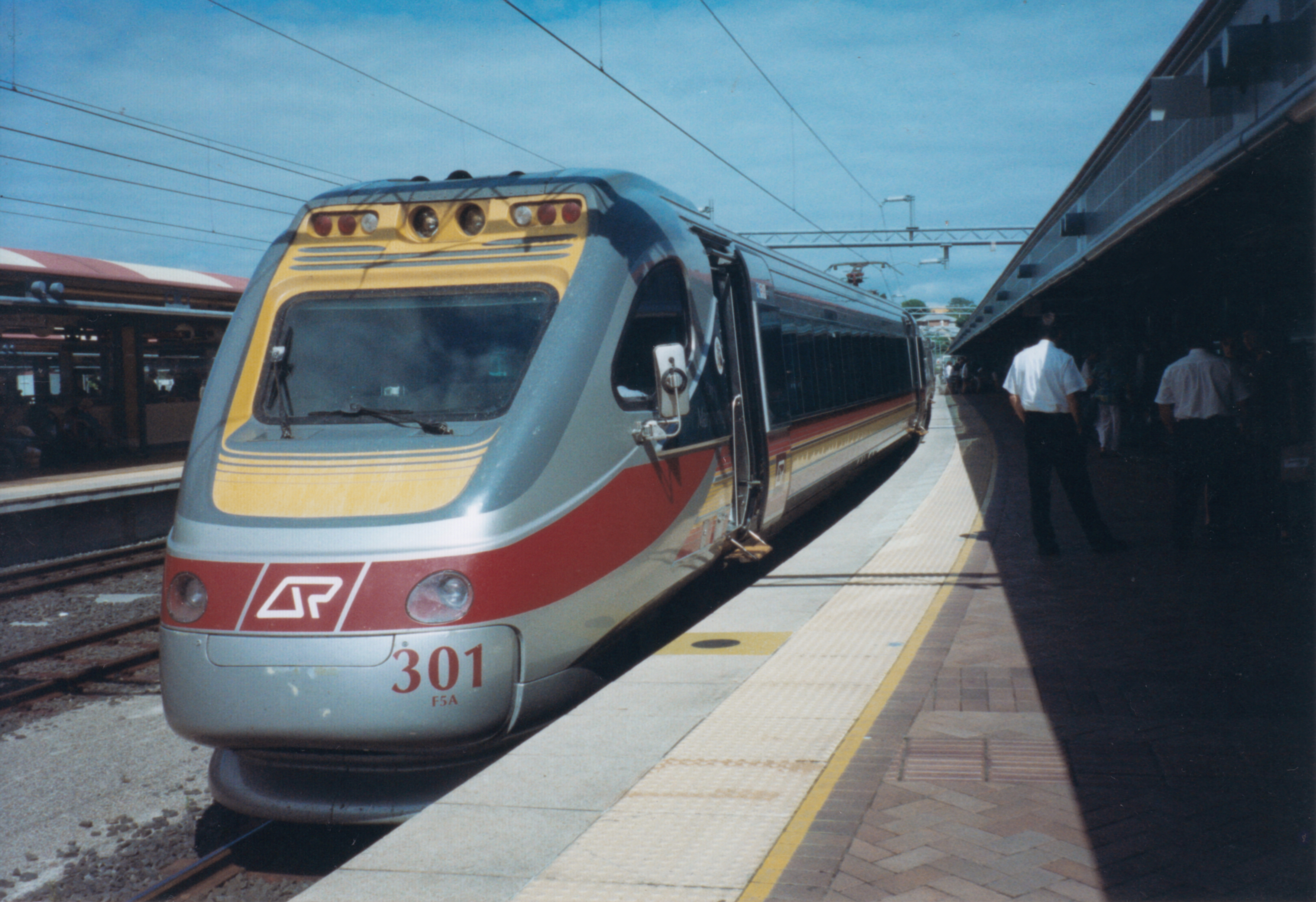
An Electric Tilt Train. In 1999, an Electric Tilt Train set an Australian speed record of 210 km/h, making it the fastest narrow-gauge train in service.

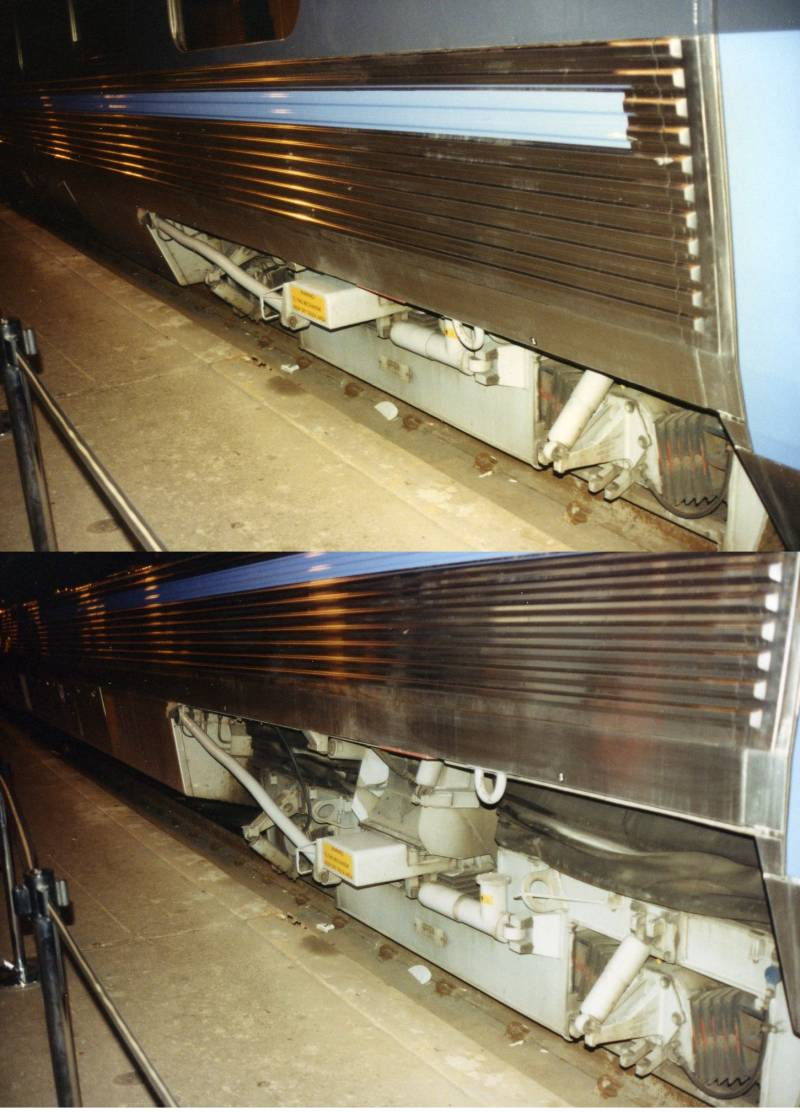
The X 2000 train on a US tour at Chicago Union Station, Illinois, in 1993. This composite image shows the extent to which the train can tilt in either direction.

Demonstration of the Tilting-Technology of a SBB RABDe 500 in stand

Many of the problems with motion sickness are related to the fact that traditional servo systems respond inappropriately to the changes in trajectory forces, and even small errors, whilst not being consciously perceivable, cause nausea due to their unfamiliar nature. The original Fiat ETR 401 used individual gyroscopes in each carriage so there was a lag, even though nausea had not been a major problem with this train. The APT was supposed to overcome this problem by using gyroscopes at the ends of the train and a leader/follower control system which defined a "tilting curve" for the whole train. It would appear that the technology of the era was unable to properly implement this technique.

Modern tilting trains profit from state-of-the-art signal processing which senses the line ahead and is able to predict optimal control signals for the individual carriages. Complaints about nausea have largely become a thing of the past.

Some tilting trains run on narrow-gauge railways. In Japan there are many narrow gauge lines in mountainous regions, and tilting trains have been designed to run there. In Australia, the service between Brisbane and Cairns by the QR Tilt Train claims to be the fastest narrow-gauge train in the world, running at 160 km/h (99 mph). The Electric Tilt Train also holds the record for the fastest narrow-gauge train by maximum test speed, reaching 210 km/h.

With tilting EMUs, consideration is required on keeping the pantographs within the railway gauge. When mounted on top of a tilting car, the pantograph usually sways in the opposite direction in order to counter for the degree of tilting. This is done mechanically on for instance the British Class 390 Alstom Pendolino. On the German class 411 and 415, the pantographs are however mounted on a separate non-tilting frame within the cars.

== Tilting trains around the world ==
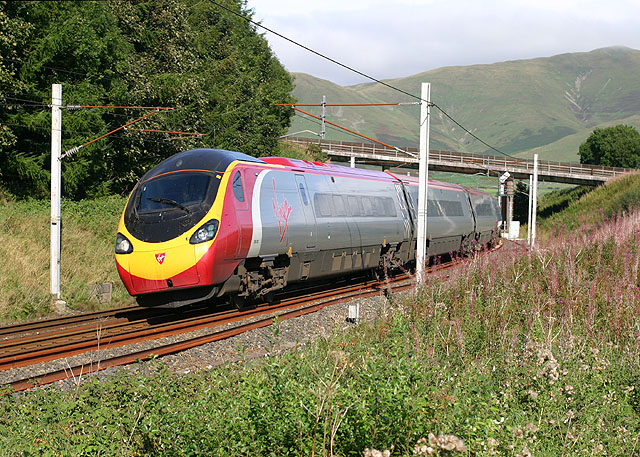
Avanti West Coast's Class 390 Alstom Pendolino is the flagship train of the West Coast Main Line in the United Kingdom.

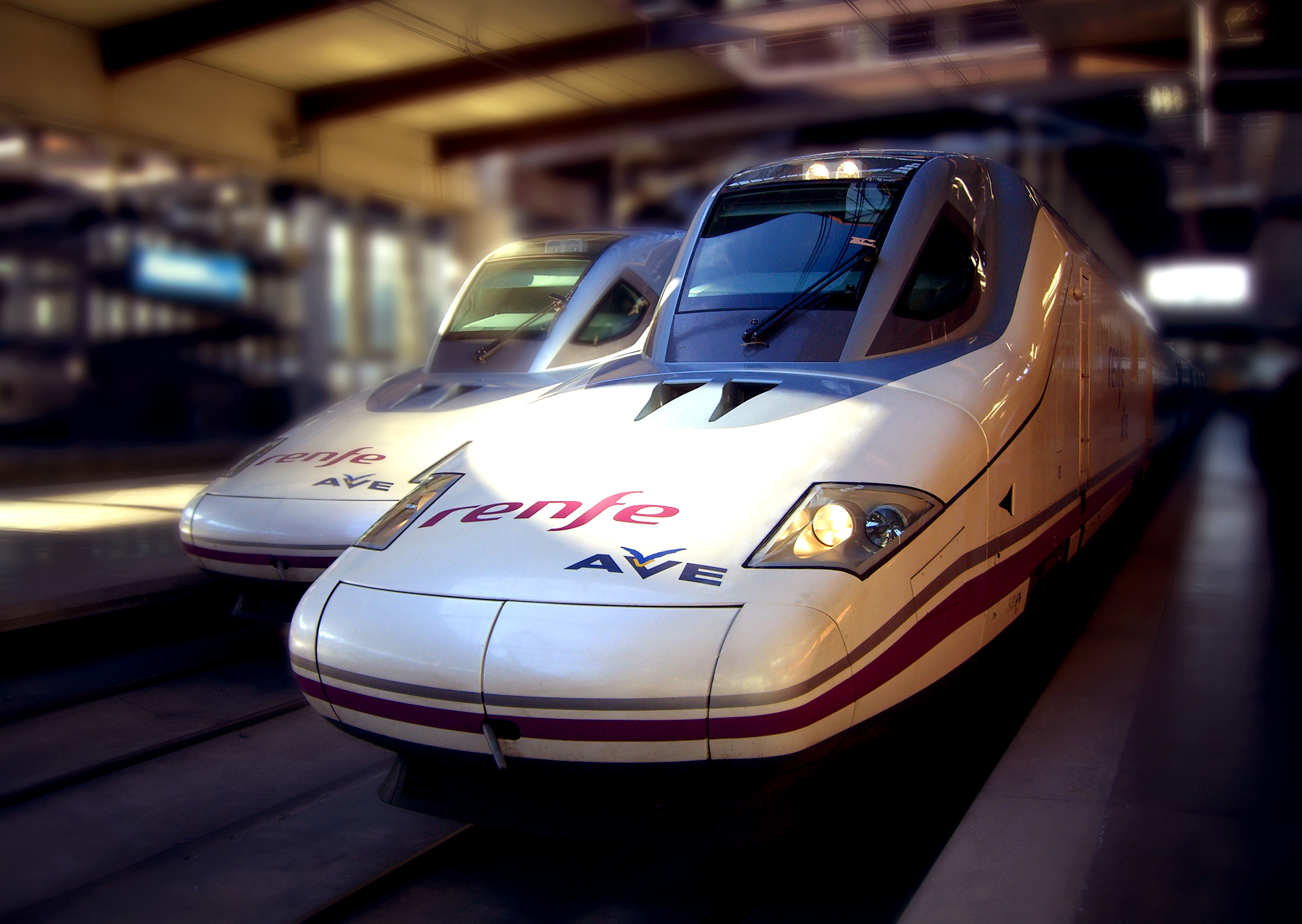
Renfe Class 102/Talgo 350 trains as used on Spanish AVE high speed lines

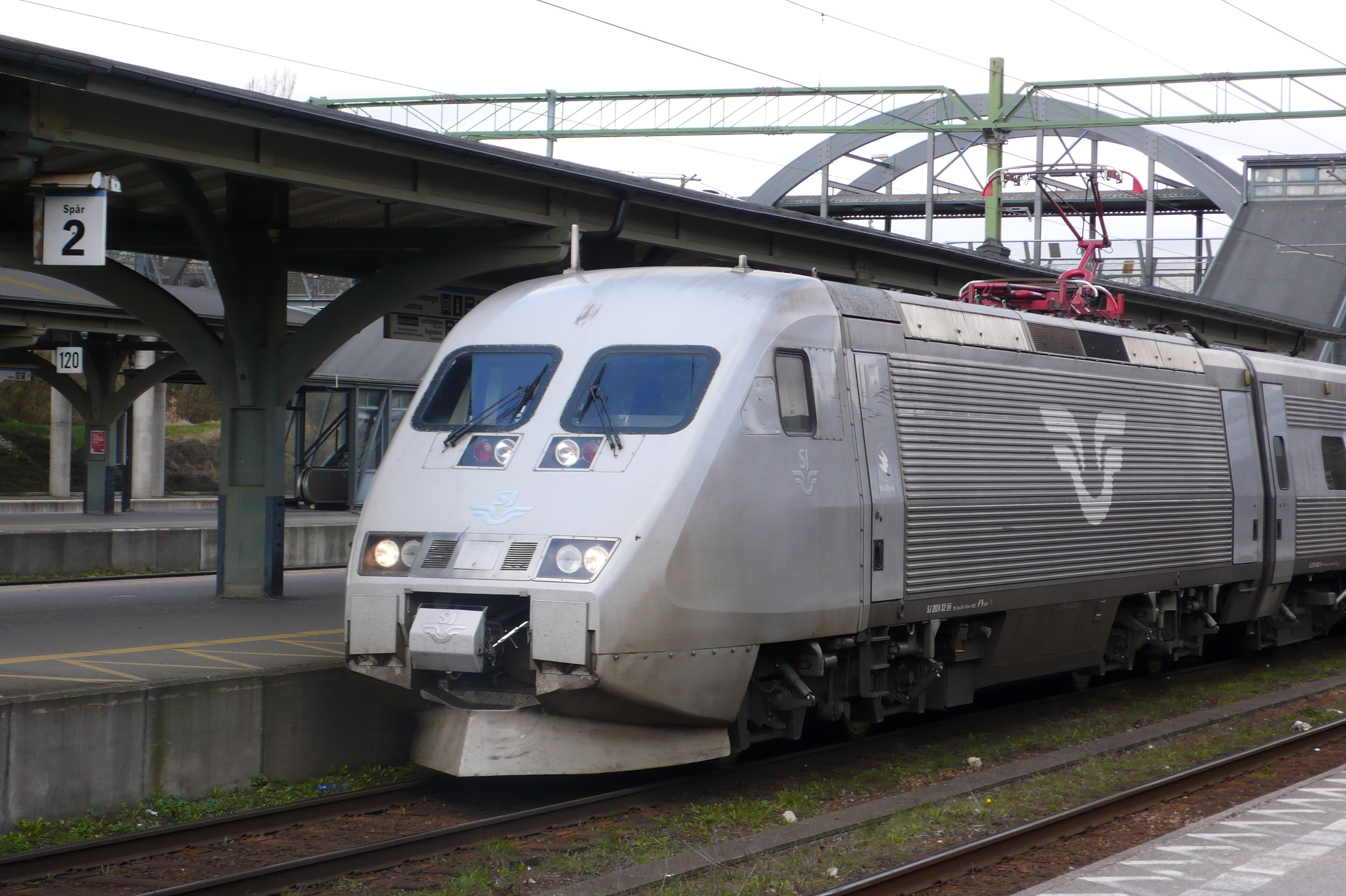
Swedish X2 tilt train

Trains with tilting by inertial forces (passive tilt):

- Talgo XXI (Spain)
- UAC TurboTrain (United States, Canada)
- JNR 381 series (Japan), introduced in 1973 by the former Japan National Railways. Formerly used by JR West for Yakumo limited express services.

Trains with tilting initiated by inertial forces but regulated by computer:

- JR Shikoku 2000 series (Japan, 1989), the first tilting DMU in the world. Currently used on numerous limited expresses in Shikoku, including Ashizuri, Ishizuchi, Nanpū, Shimanto, Shiokaze, Uwakai, and Uzushio. The upgraded N2000 Series was introduced in 1995.
- JR Hokkaido KiHa 281 series (Japan, 1992), branded Heat 281 or Furico 281. Used on the Super Hokuto limited express service.
- JR Shikoku 8000 series (Japan, 1992). Used on limited express services on the Yosan Line, namely Ishizuchi and Shiokaze.
- JR East E351 series (Japan, 1993), formerly used on the Super Azusa limited express.
- Chizu Express HOT7000 series (Japan, 1994), used on the Super Hakuto limited express.
- JR Central 383 series (Japan, 1994), used on the Wide View Shinano limited express.
- JR Kyushu 883 series (Japan, 1994), used on the Nichirin, Huis ten Bosch and Kamome limited expresses.
- JR Hokkaido KiHa 283 series (Japan, 1995), branded Furico 283 and used on the Super Hokuto, Super Ōzora, and Super Tokachi limited expresses.
- JR West 283 series (Japan, 1996), used on the Kuroshio limited express.
- JR Kyushu 885 series (Japan, 1999), used on the Kamome and Sonic limited expresses.
- JR West KiHa 187 series (Japan, 2001), used on the Super Inaba, Super Matsukaze, and Super Oki limited expresses.
- JR Shikoku 2700 series (Japan, 2019), used on the Ashizuri, Nanpū, Shimanto and Uzushio limited expresses.
- TR TEMU1000 series (Taiwan, 2007) use for Taroko Express, based on JR Kyūshū 885 Series.
- Tilt Train by QR, diesel and electric tilting Traveltrains (Australia), operating between Brisbane and Cairns. Electric Tilt Train is based on the JR Shikoku 8000 series.

Trains with active tilt controlled with sensory information given by accelerometers:

- LRC designed by MLW before being bought by Bombardier (Canada)

Trains with tilting controlled by a computer:

- Acela (United States), a Bombardier-built high-speed tilting train operating between Boston and Washington, D.C.
- Advanced Passenger Train (United Kingdom), a British Rail project for high-speed inter-city tilting trains that saw limited service in the 1980s, from London Euston to Glasgow.
- British Rail Class 390 "Pendolino" (United Kingdom), a high-speed train run by Avanti West Coast from London Euston to Liverpool/ Manchester / Glasgow / Birmingham and Wolverhampton.
- Alfa Pendular (Portugal)
- ElettroTreno (Italy)
- ICE-T, also called ICT (Germany), a tilting version of the ICE
- ICN (Switzerland), a new generation of tilting trains operated by Swiss Rail, a Bombardier-built high-speed tilting train operating between Zurich and Geneva.
- JetTrain (North America), Bombardier's experimental non-electric high-speed train
- NSB Class 73 (Norway)
- NSB Class 93 (Norway) Used on unelectrified regional services in northern Norway
- SŽ series 310 (InterCitySlovenija), a high-speed tilting train operating between Ljubljana, Maribor and Koper
- RegioSwinger (Germany and Croatia), a diesel regional tilting train. In Croatia (Croatian Railways) the train operates the premium brand services InterCity Nagibni (ICN) on the routes Zagreb–Osijek, Zagreb–Varaždin, Zagreb–Split, and Zagreb–Rijeka
- Br. 611
- Br. 610
- Pendolino (Italy, Finland, United Kingdom, and Czech Republic), built by Alstom (formerly Fiat); see also the British Rail Class 390 and Finnish VR Class Sm3.
- Super Voyager, a Bombardier-built high-speed tilting train operating between London and Holyhead / Wrexham / Chester and Birmingham to Edinburgh or Glasgow.
- X2 (Sweden), with tilting mechanism of ABB. It was also used in China under the name Xīnshísù.
- JR Hokkaido KiHa 201 series (Japan, 1996), used for metro-style commuter locals and rapids around Sapporo.
- JR Hokkaido KiHa 261 series (Japan, 1999), branded Tilt 261. Used on the Super Sōya limited express service.
- Meitetsu 1600 series (Japan, 1999), branded Panorama Super. Mainly used for Meitetsu Nishio Line limited express trains.
- Meitetsu 2000 series (Japan, 2004), branded μ-Sky. Used on limited expresses linking Nagoya and Chūbu Centrair International Airport.
- Odakyu 50000 series VSE (Japan, 2005), used for Romancecar limited express services.
- TTX (South Korea, 2007), later named Hanvit 200, experimental prototype for potential tilting trains in South Korea, with a max speed of 200 km/h and a service speed of 180 km/h. Production units not made.
- N700 Series Shinkansen (except N700-7000/8000 series) (Japan, 2007), introduced by JR Central and JR West and used on the Tōkaidō and Sanyō Shinkansen services.
- E5 Series Shinkansen (Japan, 2011), introduced by JR East, used on Tōhoku Shinkansen and Hokkaido Shinkansen services. Pooled with nearly identical H5 series units.
- E6 Series Shinkansen (Japan, 2013), introduced by JR East, used on Tōhoku Shinkansen and Akita Shinkansen services.
- TRA TEMU2000 series (Taiwan, 2013) use for Puyuma Express.
- H5 Series Shinkansen (Japan, 2014), introduced by JR Hokkaido, used on Tōhoku Shinkansen and Hokkaido Shinkansen services. Pooled with nearly identical E5 series units.
- 8600 series (Japan, 2014), introduced by JR Shikoku, used on Shiokaze and Ishizuchi limited expresses.
- E353 series (Japan, 2015), introduced by JR East, used on Azusa and Kaiji limited expresses.
- 2600 series (Japan, 2017), introduced by JR Shikoku, used on Uzushio and Shimanto limited expresses.

== See also ==
- FM P-12-42
