= 883 series =

Japanese train type

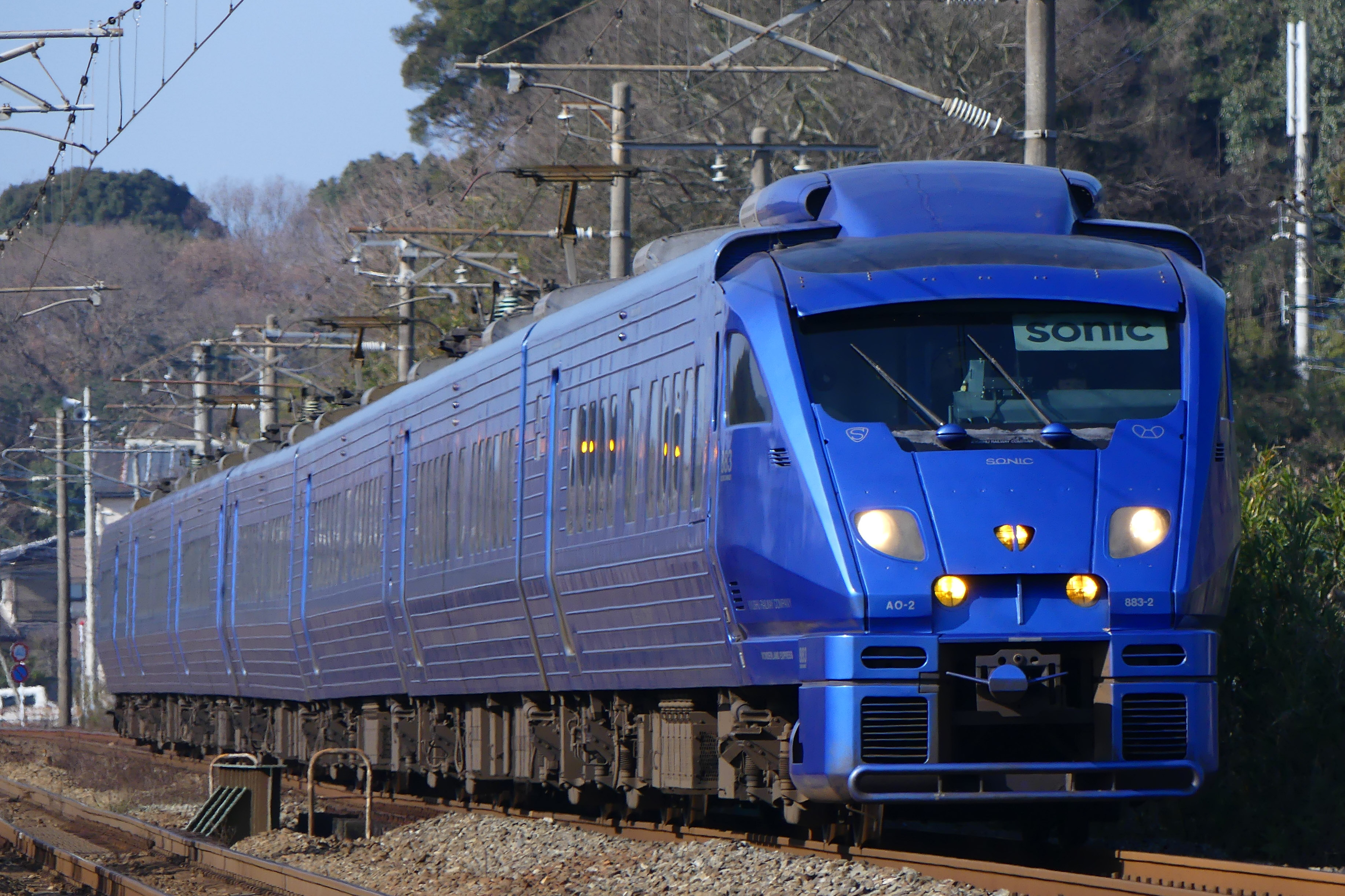
- 883 series set AO2, January 2017
- In service: April 1995–Present
- Manufacturer: Hitachi
- Built at: Kudamatsu, Yamaguchi
- Family name: Wonderland Express; A-train (883-1000 series)
- Constructed: 1994–2008
- Refurbished: 2005–2007
- Number in service: 56 vehicles (8 sets)
- Formation: 7 cars per trainset
- Fleet numbers: AO1-5, AO16-18
- Operator: JR Kyushu
- Depot: Ōita

Specifications
- Car body construction: Stainless steel Aluminium (MoHa883-1000, SaHa883-1000)
- Car length: 21,700 mm (71 ft 2 in) (end cars); 20,500 mm (67 ft 3 in) (intermediate cars)
- Width: 2,853 mm (9 ft 4.3 in)
- Height: 3,580 mm (11 ft 9 in)
- Doors: 1 per side
- Maximum speed: 130 km/h (80 mph)
- Traction system: GTO-VVVF
- Power output: 190 kW (per motor); 2,280 kW (whole set)
- Electric system: 20 kV AC, 60 Hz
- Current collection: Overhead catenary
- Braking system: Regenerative brakes
- Safety systems: ATS-SK, ATS-Dk
- Track gauge: 1,067 mm (3 ft 6 in)

Notes/references
- This train won the 39th Blue Ribbon Award in 1996.

The 883 series (883系) is an AC electric multiple unit (EMU) tilting train type operated on Sonic limited express services by Kyushu Railway Company (JR Kyushu) in Japan since April 1995.

== Design ==
The trains were built by Hitachi.

== Formations ==
The fleet was initially formed as five 7-car sets (AO1–5) and three 5-car sets (AO6–8), with the three 5-car sets having different coloured front ends: silver for AO6, yellow for A07, and dark blue for AO8. The 5-car sets were lengthened to 7 cars from July 2008 with the insertion of two -1000 subseries cars with aluminium bodies built to 885 series specifications.

=== Sets AO1–5 ===
These sets are formed as follows.

Car No.	1	2	3	4	5	6	7
Designation	Thsc	TA2	M2	TA1	M1	TA	Mc
Numbering	KuRoHa 882	SaHa 883-200	MoHa 883-200	SaHa 883-100	MoHa 883-100	SaHa 883	KuMoHa 883

Cars 2, 4, and 6 are each fitted with one PS401KA single-arm pantograph.

=== Sets AO16–18 ===
These sets are formed as follows.

Car No.	1	2	3	4	5	6	7
Designation	Thsc	TA2	M2	M3	T3	TA	Mc
Numbering	KuRoHa 882	SaHa 883-200	MoHa 883-200	MoHa 883-1000	SaHa 883-1000	SaHa 883	KuMoHa 883

Cars 2, 4, and 6 are each fitted with one PS401KA single-arm pantograph.

== History ==
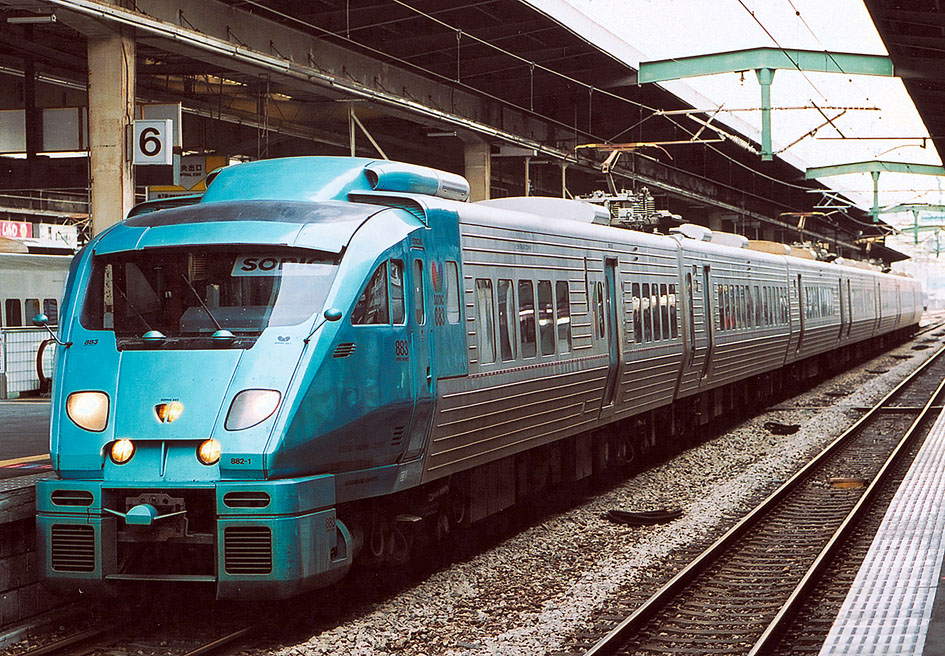
Set AO1 in original livery

The first trains entered service from 20 April 1995.

All cars were made no-smoking from the start of the revised timetable on 18 March 2007.
