= Sonic (train) =

Japanese limited express train service

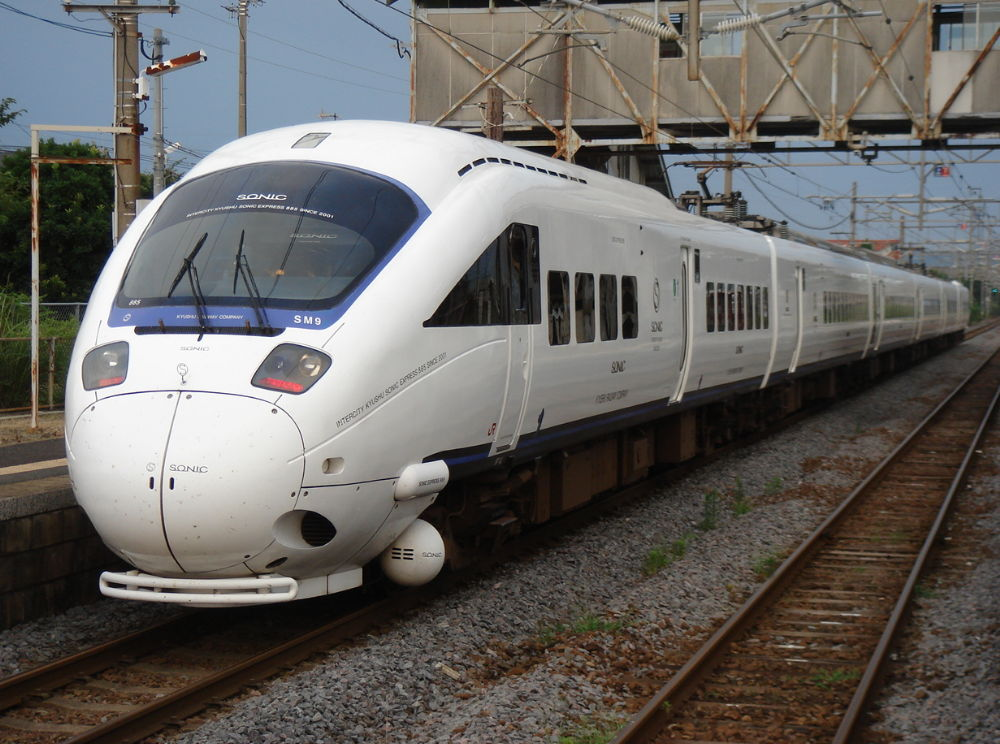
- A White Sonic 885 series EMU

Overview
- Service type: Limited express
- First service: 1997
- Current operator: JR Kyushu

Route
- Lines used: Kagoshima Main Line, Nippō Main Line

Technical
- Rolling stock: 883 series, 885 series EMUs
- Operating speed: 130 km/h (80 mph)

Sonic (ソニック, sonikku) is the name used by Kyushu Railway Company (JR Kyushu) for the limited express train service operating between Hakata and Ōita via Kokura and Beppu along the Kagoshima Main Line and Nippō Main Line in Kyushu, Japan. It runs every 30 minutes at a speed of 130 km/h (80 mph) - with a journey time of approximately 2 hours.

== Rolling stock ==
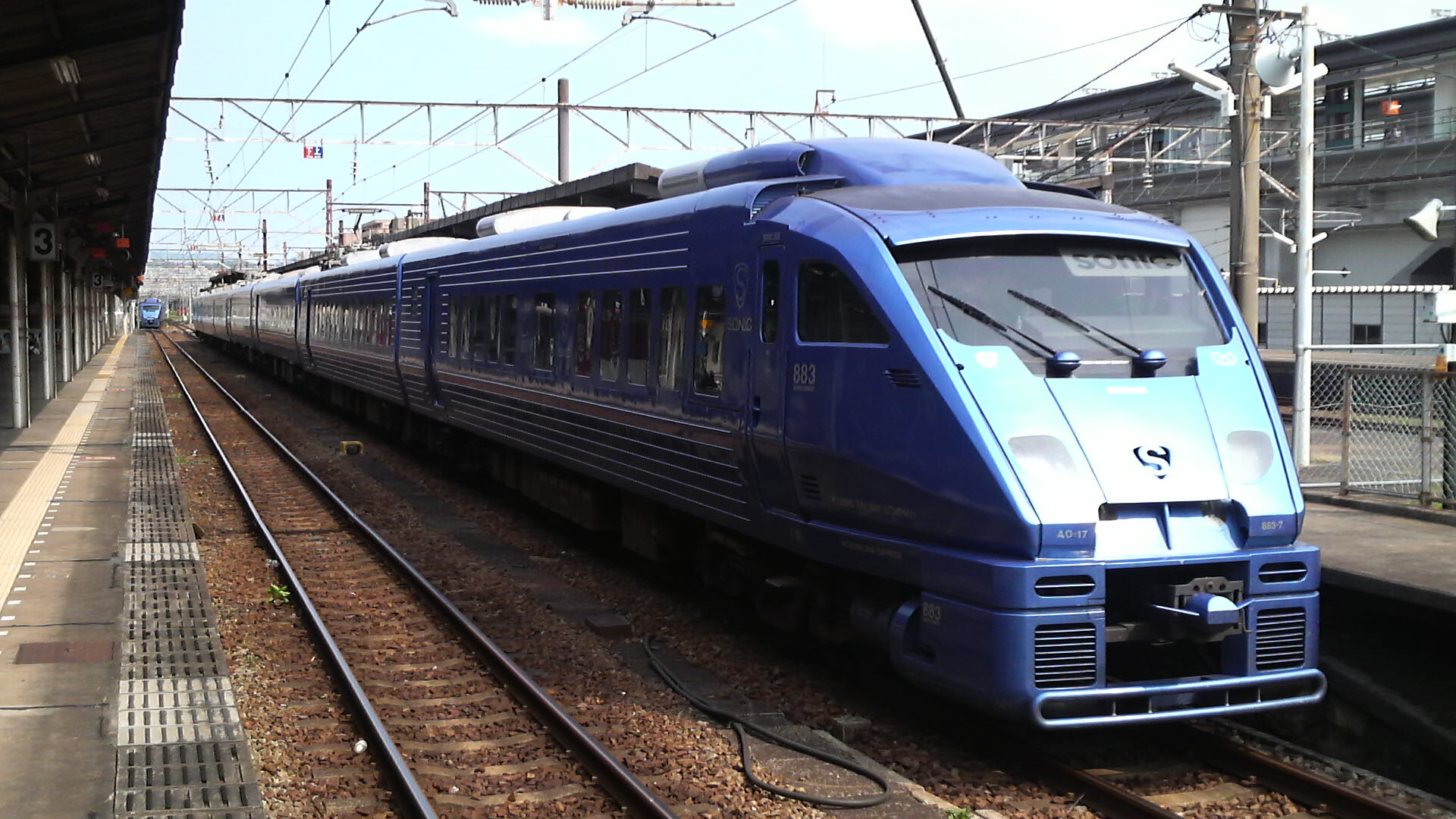
An 883 series EMU on a Sonic service in July 2008

Services are operated by a fleet of eight 7-car 883 series electric multiple unit (EMU) trains and eleven 6-car 885 series White Sonic EMUs.

- 883 series EMUs (8 x 7-car) - Since 1997
- 885 series EMUs (11 x 6-car) - Since 2001

Most services are operated by renovated 883 series trains including a panoramic lounge area located in the Green Car (first class).

== History ==
On 20 April 1995: New 883 series Sonic EMUs were introduced on Nichirin limited express services between Hakata and Ōita, and named Sonic Nichirin. Two years later, on the twenty-second of March in 1997: Nichirin and Sonic Nichirin services were combined to become Sonic services operated entirely by 883 series EMUs. On 3 March 2001 new 5-car 885 series White Sonic were introduced on Sonic services. 885 series White Sonic sets lengthened from 5 to 6 cars, which allowed interchangeability with the 885 series White Kamome sets. On 18 March 2007, smoking was banned in all cars. On 19 July the next year the three 5-car 883 series sets got augmented to 7 cars.

== See also ==
- List of named passenger trains of Japan
