= 885 series =

Japanese train type

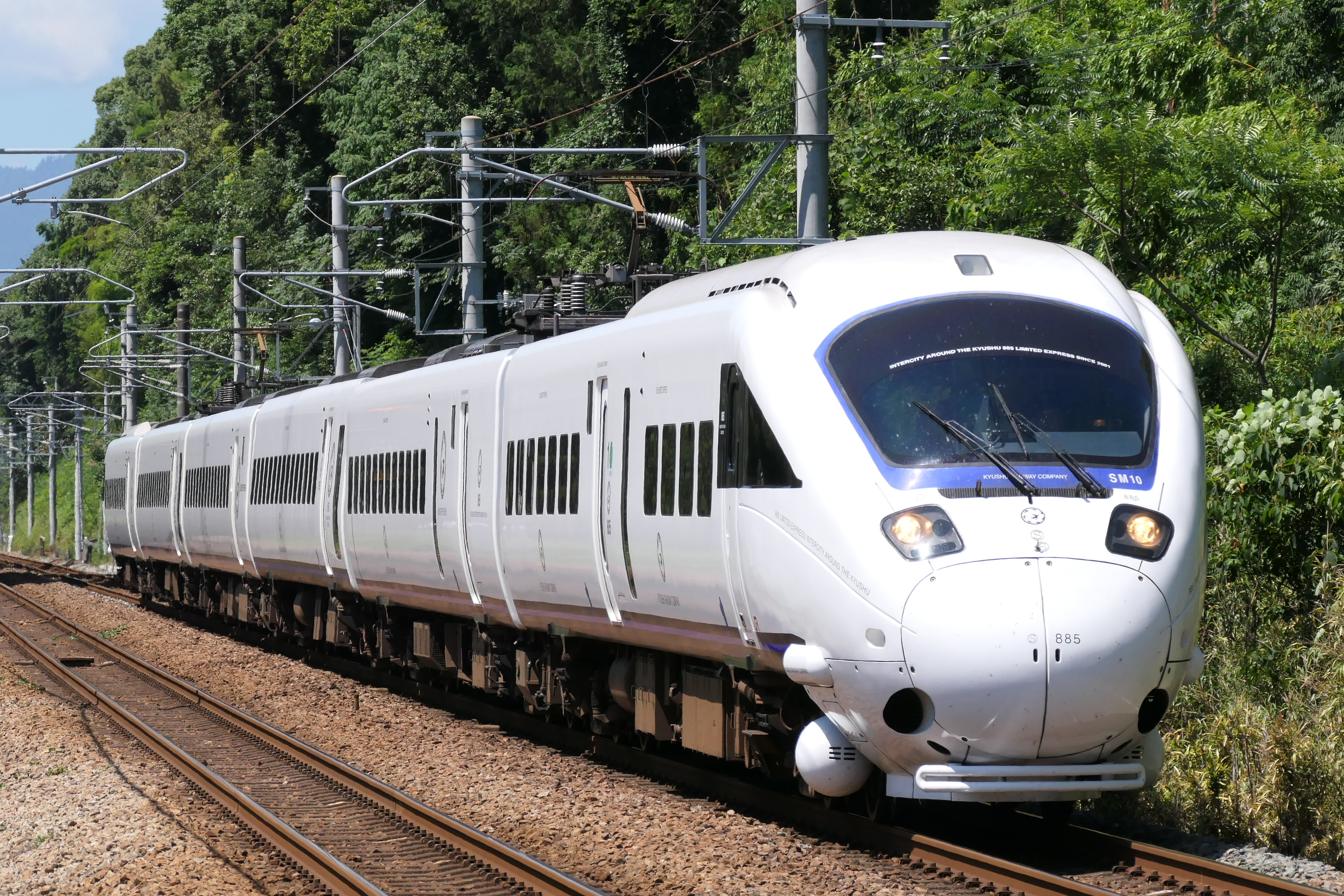
- An 885 series train in June 2019
- In service: 2000–present
- Manufacturer: Hitachi
- Family name: A-train
- Constructed: 2000–2004
- Entered service: 11 March 2000
- Number built: 69 vehicles
- Number in service: 66 vehicles (11 trainsets)
- Number scrapped: 3 vehicles (accident damage)
- Formation: 6 cars per trainset
- Fleet numbers: SM1–SM11
- Capacity: 314
- Operator: JR Kyushu
- Depot: Minami-Fukuoka
- Lines served: Kagoshima Main Line, Nagasaki Main Line, Nippō Main Line

Specifications
- Car body construction: Aluminium alloy
- Train length: 125.3 m (411 ft 1 in)
- Car length: 21,650 mm (71 ft 0 in) (end cars); 20,500 mm (67 ft 3 in) (intermediate cars)
- Width: 2,910 mm (9 ft 7 in)
- Height: 3,825 mm (12 ft 6.6 in)
- Maximum speed: 130 km/h (81 mph)
- Traction system: IGBT–VVVF
- Traction motors: 12 × 190 kW (250 hp) 3-phase AC induction motor
- Acceleration: 2.2 km/(h⋅s) (1.4 mph/s)
- Deceleration: 4.3 km/(h⋅s) (2.7 mph/s); 5.2 km/(h⋅s) (3.2 mph/s) (emergency)
- Electric system: 20 kV 60 Hz AC (overhead line)
- Current collection: Pantograph
- UIC classification: 2′2′+Bo′Bo′+2′2′+2′2′+Bo′Bo′+Bo′Bo′
- Bogies: DT406K (powered), TR406K (trailer)
- Braking system: Air brakes with regenerative braking
- Safety systems: ATS-SK, ATS-Dk
- Track gauge: 1,067 mm (3 ft 6 in)

Notes/references
- This train won the 44th Blue Ribbon Award in 2001.

The 885 series (885系) is a tilting AC electric multiple unit (EMU) train type operated on limited express services by Kyushu Railway Company (JR Kyushu) in Japan. The type is part of Hitachi's A-train family of multiple units.

== Operations ==
The 885 series is operated on two of JR Kyushu's named trains:

- Kamome between Hakata and Nagasaki on the Kagoshima and Nagasaki Main Lines. Kamome trains use the Kagoshima Main Line between Hakata and Tosu, and the Nagasaki Main Line from Tosu to Nagasaki, diverting via the Nagasaki tunnel. The Shiroi Kamome fleet entered service on 11 March 2000.
- Sonic between Hakata and Ōita using the Kagoshima and Nippō lines. The Sonic fleet entered service on 3 March 2001.

The fleet was originally divided into seven Shiroi Kamome (White Seagull) fleet sets, SM1 to SM7, with yellow lining, and four Shiroi Sonic (White Sonic) sets, SM8 to SM11, with blue lining, but the entire fleet was later made interchangeable, with all sets repainted with blue lining by June 2012.

After the opening of the Nishi Kyushu Shinkansen, the 885 series is to replace a part of the ageing 783 series train sets on the Midori service between Hakata and Sasebo. The higher speed of the 885 series in curves will allow for a 9-minute reduction in the overall travel time.

== Formations ==
The Shiroi Kamome fleet was built and entered service as six-car units. The Sonic fleet entered service as five-car units, but were extended to six cars in 2003 to allow interchangeability between the two fleets.

=== Sets SM1–7 ===
These sets are formed as follows:

Car No.	1	2	3	4	5	6
Designation	Thsc	M1	T1	T	M	Mc
Numbering	KuRoHa 884	MoHa 885-100	SaHa 885-100	SaHa 885	MoHa 885	KuMoHa 885

- Cars 2 and 5 are each fitted with one PS401KA single-arm pantograph.
- Cars 4, 5, and 6 of Set SM3 are numbered in the -400 series.

=== Sets SM8–11 ===
These sets are formed as follows.

Car No.	1	2	3	4	5	6
Designation	Thsc	M2	T2	T	M	Mc
Numbering	KuRoHa 884	MoHa 885-200	SaHa 885-300	SaHa 885	MoHa 885	KuMoHa 885

- Cars 2 and 5 are each fitted with one PS401KA single-arm pantograph.

== Interior ==
Seating is covered in leather. The interior flooring is made of wood.

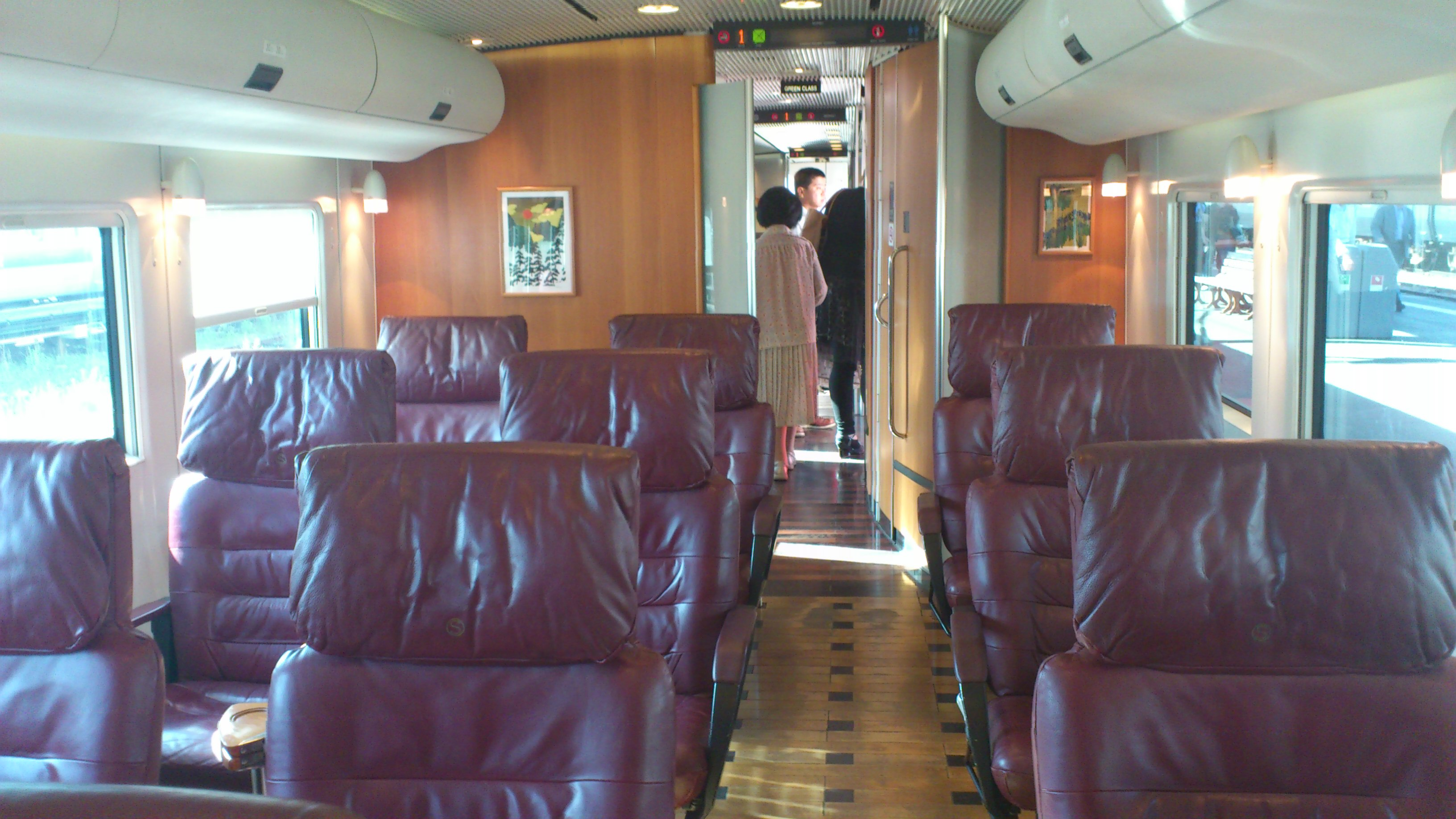
Green car interior

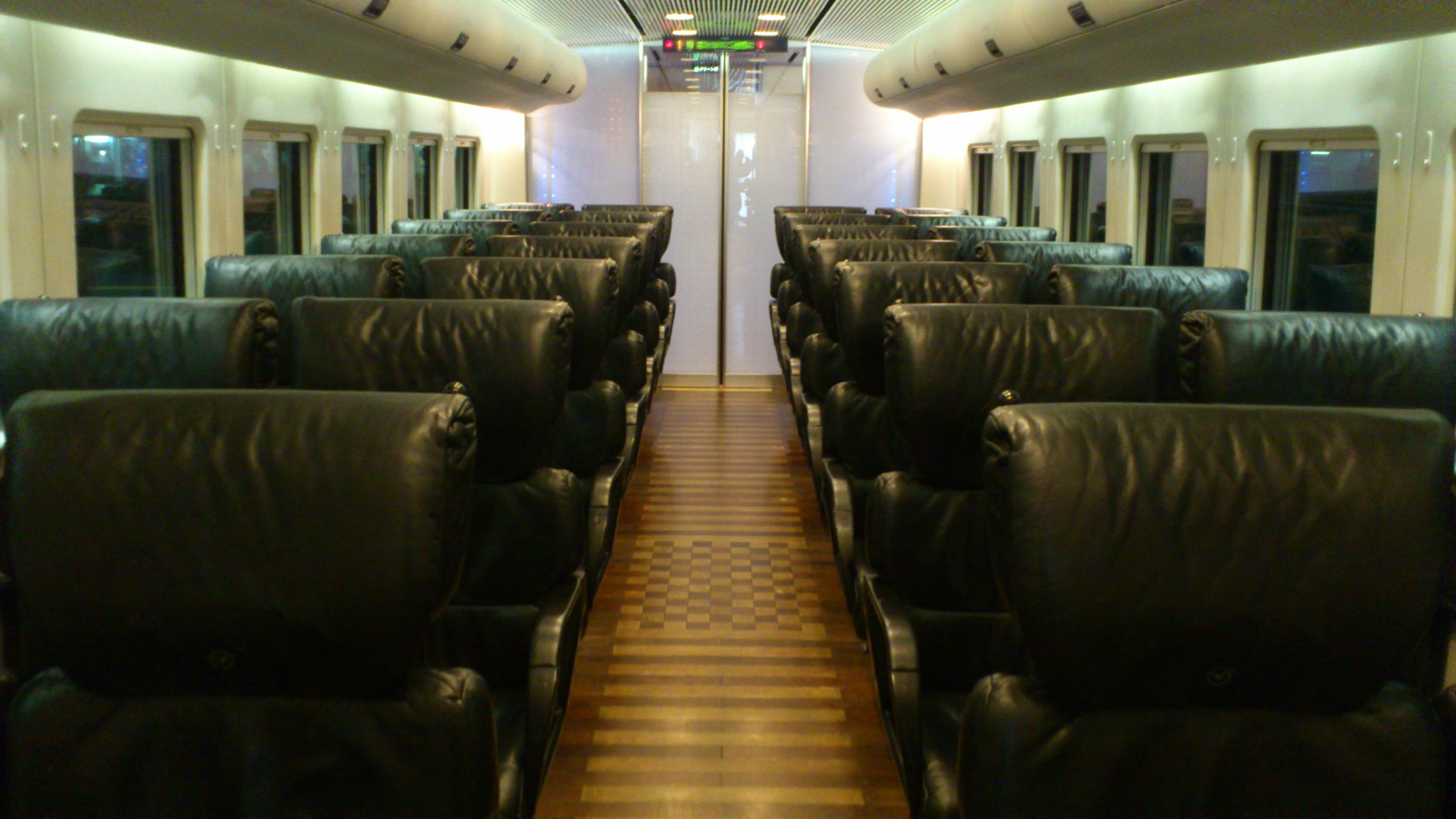
Standard-class interior

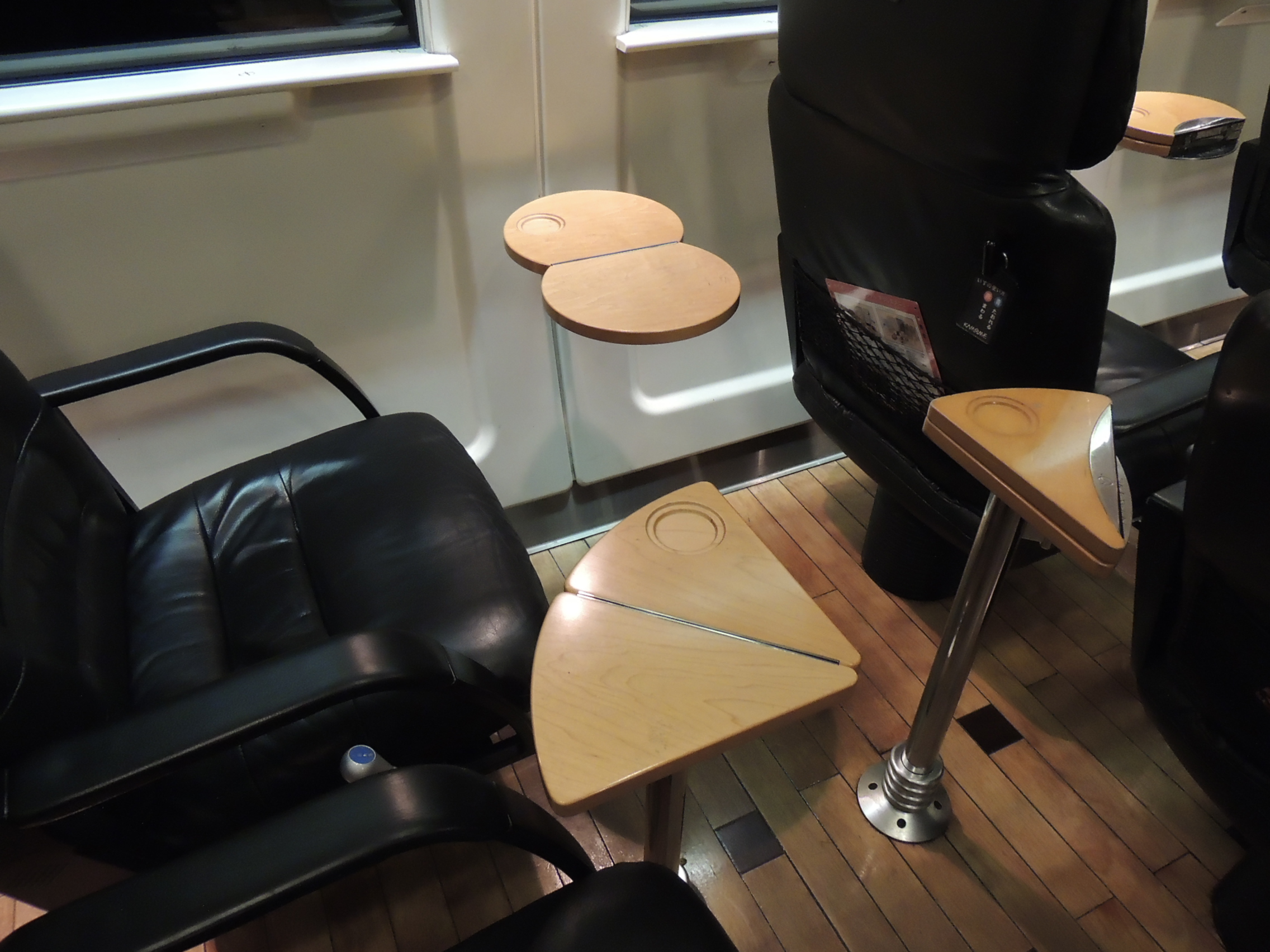
Seat and tables

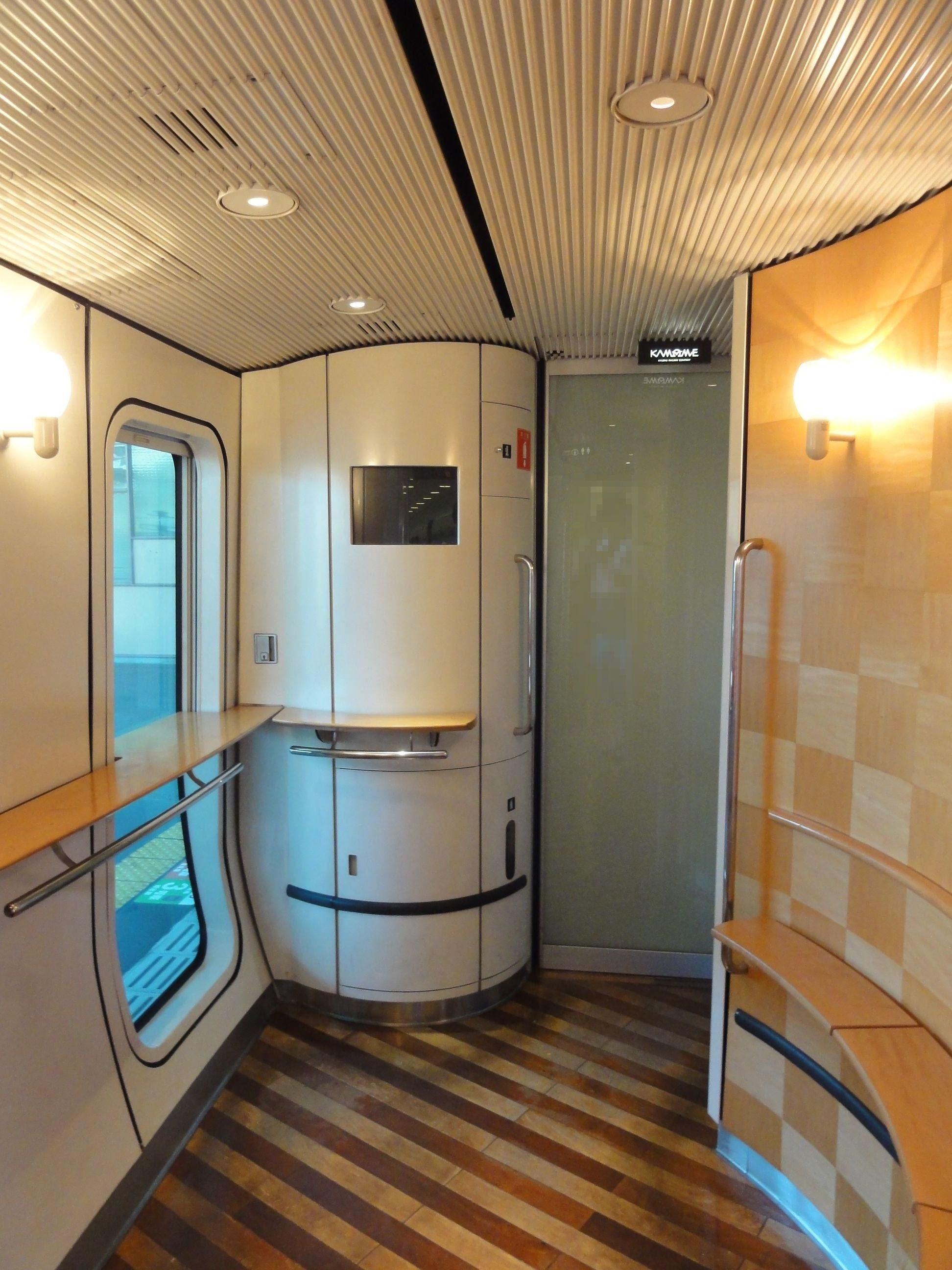
Common space

== History ==
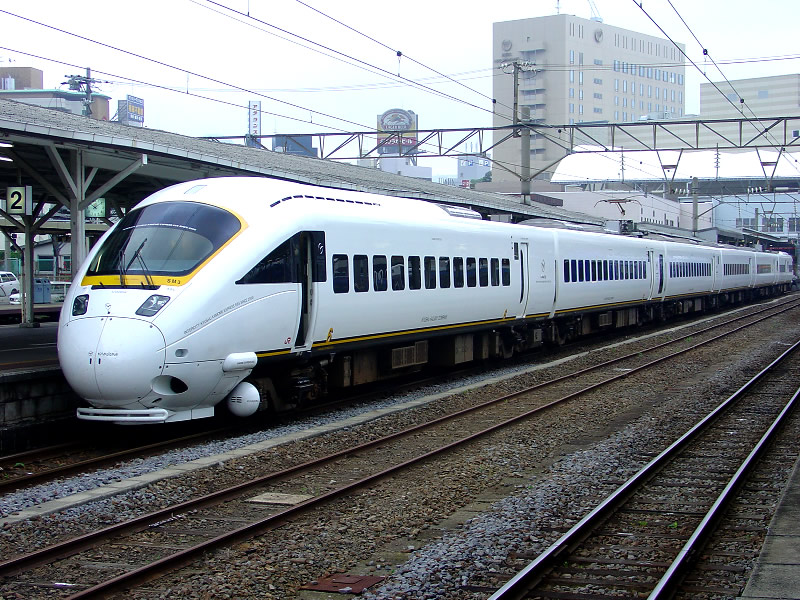
885 series train in original Kamome livery, July 2005

All cars were made no-smoking from the start of the revised timetable on 18 March 2007.

By June 2012, all sets were repainted into the Sonic colour scheme of white with blue lining.

== Exports ==
The 885 series has also been used as the basis for six 8-car trains for use on the route between Taipei and Hualien in Taiwan (known as Taroko Express). Deliveries of the trains began in late 2006, with the first public test of the new trains in March 2007.
