= Acela (disambiguation) =

Acela is a train service operated by Amtrak in the northeastern United States between Washington, D.C., and Boston.

Acela may also refer to the following Amtrak related subjects:

- Acela Express (trainset), the first-generation rolling stock used on the train service
- Avelia Liberty, the second-generation rolling stock (also known as Acela II) used on the train service
- Northeast Regional, once known briefly as "Acela Regional"
- Clocker (train), once known briefly as "Acela Commuter".
