= List of Amtrak routes =

Geographic map of Amtrak services as of August 2025

Amtrak operates the following inter-city and long-distance passenger train routes.

== Current routes ==
Amtrak service is divided into three categories of routes: Northeast Corridor (NEC) routes, state-supported routes, and long distance routes. These types indicate how the service is funded. Northeast Corridor service is directly subsidized by federal appropriations. Federally-supported long distance services are subsidized by appropriations under a separate line item from the NEC in federal budgets. Additionally, Amtrak partners with 18 states to provide additional short- and medium-distance services desired by those states. They are subsidized by periodic payments to Amtrak from the state partners. Three routes – the Carolinian, Northeast Regional, and Vermonter – are state-subsidized only on the sections of their routes off the Northeast Corridor (north of New Haven, and south of Washington).

The Gold Runner and Northeast Regional have branches served by different trips, while the Empire Builder and Lake Shore Limited split into two sections to serve branches. On the Capitol Corridor, Cascades, Empire Service, Keystone Service, Northeast Regional, and Pacific Surfliner, some or all trips do not run the full length of the route.

Name	Type	Route	Numbers	Daily round trips	FY2025 passengers	Route miles
Acela	NEC	Boston – New York – Washington	2100–2290	16 (weekday), 4 (Sat), 9 (Sun)	3,153,621	456
Adirondack	State-supported	Montreal – New York	68, 69	1	83,938	381
Amtrak Cascades	State-supported	Vancouver – Seattle – Portland – Eugene	500–519	4	951,397	467
Auto Train	Long distance	Lorton – Sanford	52, 53	1	265,952	855
Berkshire Flyer	State-supported	New York – Pittsfield	1235, 1244	1 weekly round trip (seasonal)	826 (Note: Only includes ridership on the Albany/Rensselaer–Pittsfield segment.)	190
Blue Water	State-supported	Chicago – Port Huron	364, 365	1	177,739	319
Borealis	State-supported	Saint Paul – Chicago	1333, 1340	1	212,909	417
California Zephyr	Long distance	Chicago – Emeryville, California	5, 6	1	403,142	2,438
Capitol Corridor	State-supported	Auburn – Sacramento – Oakland – San Jose	520–553, 720–751	9	1,138,753	172
Cardinal	Long distance	Chicago – New York	50, 51	3 weekly round trips	98,583	1,147
Carolinian	NEC; State-supported	New York – Charlotte	79, 80	1	347,360	704
City of New Orleans	Long distance	Chicago – New Orleans	58, 59	1	234,687	926
Coast Starlight	Long distance	Seattle – Los Angeles	11, 14	1	375,571	1,377
Crescent	Long distance	New York City – New Orleans	19, 20	1	316,213	1,377
Downeaster	State-supported	Brunswick – Portland – Boston	680–699, 1689	5	549,120	145
Empire Builder	Long distance	Chicago – Spokane – Portland/Seattle	7, 8, 27, 28	1	364,495	2,257 (Chicago–Portland); 2,206 (Chicago–Seattle)
Empire Service	State-supported	New York – Albany – Niagara Falls	230–288	7 (Sun–Fri), 6 (Sat)	1,815,644 (Note: Maple Leaf ridership is included in Empire Service ridership figure.)	460
Ethan Allen Express	State-supported	New York – Burlington	290, 291	1	85,314	308
Floridian	Long distance	Chicago – Miami	40, 41	1	– (Note: Floridian service began in November 2024.)	2,076
Gold Runner	State-supported	Oakland/Sacramento – Bakersfield	701–719	6	899,903	318 (Bakersfield–Oakland); 280 (Bakersfield–Sacramento)
Hartford Line	State-supported	Springfield – New Haven	405–432, 450–497	6 (weekday), 4 (Sat), 5 (Sun)	474,990 (Note: Valley Flyer ridership is included in Hartford Line ridership figure.)	63
Heartland Flyer	State-supported	Oklahoma City – Fort Worth	821, 822	1	80,876	206
Hiawatha	State-supported	Chicago – Milwaukee	329–343	6 (Monday–Saturday), 5 (Sunday)	631,990	86
Illini and Saluki	State-supported	Chicago – Carbondale	390–393	2	319,114	310
Illinois Zephyr and Carl Sandburg	State-supported	Chicago – Quincy	380–383	2	146,049	258
Keystone Service	State-supported	New York – Philadelphia – Harrisburg	600–674	13 (weekday), 7 (weekend)	1,330,349	195
Lake Shore Limited	Long distance	New York/Boston – Albany – Chicago	48, 49, 448, 449	1	382,881	1,018 (Chicago – Boston); 959 (Chicago – New York)
Lincoln Service	State-supported	Chicago – St. Louis	300–302, 304–307, 318–319	4	592,735	284
Maple Leaf	State-supported	New York – Toronto	63, 64	1		544
Mardi Gras Service	State-supported	New Orleans – Mobile	23–26	2	(Note: Mardi Gras Service service began in August 2025.)	145
Missouri River Runner	State-supported	St. Louis – Kansas City	311, 316, 318–319	2	196,989	283
Northeast Regional	NEC; State-supported	Boston/Springfield – New York – Washington – Norfolk/Newport News/Roanoke	65–67, 82–88, 93–96, 99, 111, 121–196	18 (weekday), 15 (weekend)	12,018,536	644 (Boston – Newport News); 679 (Boston – Norfolk); 682 (Boston – Roanoke)
Pacific Surfliner	State-supported	San Luis Obispo – Goleta – Los Angeles – San Diego	562–595, 761–794	12	2,043,059	350
Palmetto	Long distance	New York City – Savannah	89, 90	1	357,200	829
Pennsylvanian	State-supported	New York – Pittsburgh	42–45	2	236,003	444
Pere Marquette	State-supported	Chicago – Grand Rapids	370, 371	1	97,177	176
Piedmont	State-supported	Raleigh – Charlotte	71–78	4	360,655	173
Silver Meteor	Long distance	New York – Miami	97, 98	1	331,917	1,389
Southwest Chief	Long distance	Chicago – Los Angeles	3, 4	1	294,359	2,256
Sunset Limited	Long distance	New Orleans – Los Angeles	1, 2	3 weekly round trips	91,493	1,995
Texas Eagle	Long distance	Chicago – San Antonio (through cars to Los Angeles on the Sunset Limited)	21, 22, 421, 422	1	372,135	1,306 (Chicago – San Antonio); 2,728 (Chicago – Los Angeles)
Valley Flyer	State-supported	Greenfield – Springfield – New Haven	400, 461, 471, 478, 488, 494, 495, 499	2		102
Vermonter	NEC; State-supported	St. Albans – Washington	54–57	1	115,940	611
Winter Park Express	State-supported	Denver – Winter Park Resort	1105, 1106	3–4 weekly round trips (seasonal)	16,209	62
Wolverine	State-supported	Chicago – Pontiac	350–355	3	438,427	304

== Full listing ==
This listing includes current and discontinued routes operated by Amtrak since May 1, 1971. Some intercity trains were also operated after 1971 by the Alaska Railroad, Chicago, Rock Island and Pacific Railroad, Chicago South Shore and South Bend Railroad, Denver and Rio Grande Western Railroad, Georgia Railroad, Reading Company, and Southern Railway. The Southern Railway and D&RGW routes were taken over by Amtrak in 1979 and 1983 respectively.

Name	Indicates Amtrak's name for the train; or in some cases the pre-Amtrak name for trains operating prior to November 14, 1971
Route	The endpoints and major intermediate stops for the train. Changes to terminal stations within the same city, as well as route changes that did not modify the endpoint cities, are not shown.
Service began	The date Amtrak began operating the train
Service ended	The date Amtrak ceased operating the train
Notes	Additional information concerning name changes and prior operators
‡	Trains conveyed to Amtrak either on May 1, 1971, or afterward
†	Trains that are currently operating
†‡	Trains conveyed to Amtrak that are currently operating

=== Northeast Corridor ===
As inherited from Penn Central, most names for Northeast Corridor trains – except for the Metroliner and Clocker – were used for only one one-way or round-trip train. These names were frequently changed from the 1970s to the 1990s. These named trains were consolidated under the NortheastDirect brand in 1995, though individual names appeared on timetables from 1996 to 1999. The Acela Regional brand was used for all-electric service beginning in 2000. Northeast Corridor service, except for the Acela Express, was rebranded Regional in 2003 and finally Northeast Regional in 2008.

This listing shows only trains operated primarily on the Northeast Corridor and the New Haven–Springfield Line, plus extensions of those trains into Virginia. Trains serving endpoints outside these areas are listed separately.

Name	Route	Service began	Service ended	Notes
Acela †	Washington, D.C. – New York City	November 11, 2000	present	
Acela Regional	Newport News – Springfield/Boston	November 31, 2000	March 16, 2003	Replaced NortheastDirect gradually from January 31, 2000, to September 30, 2001; replaced by Regional
Afternoon Congressional ‡	Washington, D.C. – New York City	May 1, 1971	November 13, 1971	
Hartford Line †	New Haven – Springfield	October 18, 1995	present	Renamed from sections of connecting trains. Usually branded under NortheastDirect until September 30, 2001, timetable.
Bankers	Springfield – Washington, D.C.	October 26, 1975	October 28, 1995	Replaced by NortheastDirect
Bay State	New York City – Boston	May 17, 1971	November 14, 1971	The Bay State traveled via the Inland Route in all iterations
Bay State	Washington, D.C. – Boston	November 14, 1971	October 29, 1972	The Bay State traveled via the Inland Route in all iterations
Bay State	Philadelphia – Boston	October 29, 1972	April 29, 1973	The Bay State traveled via the Inland Route in all iterations
Bay State	New Haven – Boston	April 29, 1973	March 1, 1975	The Bay State traveled via the Inland Route in all iterations
Bay State	Washington, D.C. – Boston	October 20, 1984	October 28, 1995	Merged into NortheastDirect
Beacon Hill	Boston – New Haven	April 30, 1978	October 26, 1979	Replaced Clamdigger
Beacon Hill	Boston – New Haven	February 3, 1980	October 1, 1981	
Benjamin Franklin	Philadelphia – Boston	February 15, 1977		Replaced Bicentennial
Betsy Ross	Washington, D.C. – New York City	February 15, 1976	June 14, 1976	Replaced by the Colonial
Betsy Ross	Washington, D.C. – New York City		October 28, 1995	Merged into NortheastDirect
Bicentennial	Philadelphia – Boston	February 15, 1976	February 14, 1977	Replaced Bunker Hill; replaced by Benjamin Franklin
Big Apple	Philadelphia – New York City	October 28, 1979	April 26, 1980	Formerly an unnamed Clocker
Big Apple	Harrisburg – New York City	April 27, 1980	April 30, 1994	Only weekend trains ran from Harrisburg until October 24, 1981, when weekday service was cut. Merged into Keystone Service.
Bostonian ‡	New York City – Boston	May 1, 1971	November 13, 1971	
Bostonian ‡	New York City – Boston	May 19, 1974	April 29, 1978	
Bowery	Washington, D.C. – New York City			
Bunker Hill	Philadelphia – Boston	November 14, 1971	February 15, 1976	Replaced by Bicentennial
Capitol	Washington, D.C. – New York City	April 26, 1981	October 29, 1983	
Capitol Hill	Washington, D.C. – New York City		October 28, 1995	Replaced by NortheastDirect
Capitol Hill Express				
Capitol Sunrise	Philadelphia – Washington, D.C.			
Central Park	Philadelphia – New York City	October 28, 1979	April 26, 1980	
Charter Oak	New York City – Springfield	November 14, 1971	October 28, 1972	
Charter Oak	New York City – Springfield		October 28, 1995	Merged into NortheastDirect
Charter Oak	Washington, D.C. – Springfield	November 10, 1996	July 9, 1997	Replaced unnamed NortheastDirect train; renamed Colonial
Charter Oak	Richmond – Springfield	July 10, 1997	October 26, 1997	Replaced unnamed NortheastDirect train; renamed Colonial
Chesapeake	Washington, D.C. – New York City	April 29, 1973	June 11, 1977	
Chesapeake	Philadelphia – Washington, D.C.	April 30, 1978	October 29, 1983	Maryland/Pennsylvania-funded commuter service
Chesapeake	New York City – Richmond	May 1, 1994	October 28, 1995	Merged into NortheastDirect
Clamdigger ‡	New Haven – New London	May 1, 1971	January 28, 1972	
Clamdigger ‡	New Haven – Providence	September 9, 1976	October 28, 1977	
Clamdigger ‡	New Haven – Providence	January 8, 1978	April 30, 1978	Replaced by Beacon Hill
Clocker ‡	Philadelphia – New York City	May 1, 1971	October 27, 1979	Unnamed 1971–1979; carried individual names 1979–1981
Clocker ‡	Philadelphia – New York City	October 25, 1981	October 28, 2005	
Colonial ‡	Washington, D.C. – Boston	May 1, 1971	April 28, 1973	
Colonial	Washington, D.C. – Boston	February 15, 1976	June 15, 1976	
Colonial	Newport News – New York City	June 15, 1976	February 15, 1977	Replaced Betsy Ross and Mount Vernon. Saturday southbound service originated in Boston.
Colonial	Newport News – Boston	February 15, 1977	October 26, 1992	Replaced by Old Dominion
Colonial	Richmond – Springfield	October 26, 1997	May 15, 1999	Replaced Charter Oak; merged into NortheastDirect
Concord	Washington, D.C. – Boston			
Congressional	Washington, D.C. – New York City	November 14, 1971	December 16, 1971	
Congressional	Washington, D.C. – New York City	April 30, 1978		
Congressional	Boston – Washington, D.C.		October 28, 1995	Merged into NortheastDirect
Connecticut Valley Service ‡	Springfield – New Haven	May 1, 1971	1986	Name did not appear in timetables until 1980. Renamed as sections of their connecting trains in 1986.
Connecticut Yankee	Washington, D.C. – Springfield	November 14, 1971	October 29, 1972	
Connecticut Yankee	Washington, D.C. – New Haven	October 29, 1972	April 29, 1973	
Connecticut Yankee	Philadelphia – Springfield	April 29, 1973	June 11, 1977	
Connecticut Yankee	Washington, D.C. – Springfield		October 28, 1995	Merged into NortheastDirect
East Wind	New York City – Boston	November 14, 1971	October 28, 1973	
East Wind	Washington, D.C. – Boston	October 28, 1973	February 14, 1976	
Edison	Philadelphia – New York City	October 28, 1979	October 24, 1981	Formerly unnamed; renamed Clocker
Embassy ‡	Washington, D.C. – New York City	May 1, 1971	November 13, 1971	
Embassy ‡	Washington, D.C. – New York City	October 31, 1976	May 25, 1981	
Evening Executive	Washington, D.C. – New Haven	November 14, 1971	June 10, 1972	
Evening Liberty Express	Philadelphia – Boston	April 30, 1978	October 27, 1979	
Evening Metropolitan	Washington, D.C. – New York City			
Evening Metropolitan	Philadelphia – New York City			
Executive Sleeper	Washington, D.C. – New York City	April 27, 1986	August 19, 1994	Washington–New York section of the Night Owl; renamed from Washington Executive
Fairfield				
Fast Mail	Washington, D.C. – Boston/Springfield		October 28, 1995	Merged into NortheastDirect
Federal	Washington, D.C. – Boston	April 28, 2003	April 26, 2004	Replaced the Twilight Shoreliner; merged into Regional
First State				
Flying Yankee	New York City – Boston	May 19, 1974	April 29, 1978	Replaced Shoreliner
Foggy Bottom	Washington, D.C. – New York City			
Free State	Washington, D.C. – New York City	November 14, 1971	October 28, 1973	
Garden State	Philadelphia – New York City	October 28, 1979	October 24, 1981	Formerly unnamed; renamed Clocker
Garden State Special				
Georgetown	Washington, D.C. – New York City			
Gotham	Philadelphia – New York City	October 28, 1979	October 24, 1981	Renamed Clocker
Gotham Express	Boston/Springfield – New York City		October 28, 1995	Merged into NortheastDirect
Gotham Limited	Newport News – New York City	July 10, 1997	May 16, 1999	Renamed from Potomac; merged into NortheastDirect
Herald Square	Philadelphia – New York City	October 28, 1979	October 24, 1981	Renamed Clocker
Herald Square	Washington, D.C. – New York City	October 25, 1981		Replaced Times Square
Independence	New York City – Washington, D.C.	October 25, 1981		
Independence	Washington, D.C. – Springfield		October 28, 1995	Merged into NortheastDirect
James River	Newport News – Washington, D.C.	October 30, 1994	October 28, 1995	Renamed from one Tidewater round trip; merged into NortheastDirect
James River	Newport News – Washington, D.C.	November 10, 1996	May 16, 1999	Replaced unnamed NortheastDirect train; merged back into NortheastDirect
Jeffersonian	New York City – Washington, D.C.	October 25, 1981		
John Adams	Philadelphia – Boston	June 12, 1977	April 29, 1978	
Keystone	Philadelphia – New York City	October 28, 1979	April 26, 1980	Formerly an unnamed Clocker
Keystone	Harrisburg – New York City	April 27, 1980	October 24, 1981	Only weekend trains ran from Harrisburg. Renamed Susquehanna
Knickerbocker	New York City – Boston	May 19, 1974	June 11, 1977	
Legislator ‡	Washington, D.C. – New York City	May 1, 1971	November 13, 1971	
Liberty Bell	Washington – New York City		October 28, 1995	Replaced by NortheastDirect
Liberty Express	Philadelphia – Boston	October 28, 1979		
Mail Express				
Manhattan ‡	New York City – Boston	May 1, 1971	November 13, 1971	
Manhattan ‡	New York City – Boston	August 15, 1973	October 28, 1973	Replaced Manhattan Turbo
Manhattan Express	Richmond – New York City	September 10, 1995	October 28, 1995	Replaced Old Dominion; merged into NortheastDirect
Manhattan Limited	Philadelphia – New York City	October 28, 1979	October 24, 1981	Renamed Clocker
Manhattan Limited	Washington, D.C. – New York City	October 25, 1981		
Manhattan Turbo	New York City – Boston	October 29, 1972	August 15, 1973	Replaced by Manhattan
Mayflower	Washington, D.C. – Boston	May 19, 1974	September 12, 1975	
Mayflower	Washington, D.C. – Boston		October 28, 1995	Merged into NortheastDirect
Merchants	Washington, D.C. – Boston	October 20, 1977	April 30, 1978	Renamed from and to Merchants Limited
Merchants Limited ‡	New York City – Boston	May 1, 1971	November 14, 1971	
Merchants Limited ‡	Washington, D.C. – Boston	November 14, 1971	October 28, 1995	Named Merchants (November 20, 1977 – April 30, 1978); merged into NortheastDirect
Metroliner ‡	Washington, D.C. – New York City	May 1, 1971	October 27, 2006	
Metroliner ‡	Washington, D.C. – New Haven	November 14, 1971	October 30, 1977	
Metroliner ‡	Washington, D.C. – New Haven	October 20, 1977	February 22, 1978	
Metroliner ‡	Washington, D.C. – New Haven	October 26, 1981		
Metroliner ‡	Downingtown – Washington, D.C.	October 29, 1989	October 25, 1991	One southbound trip only
Metroliner ‡	Washington, D.C. – Boston	May 2, 2005	October 31, 2005	Temporary replacement for Acela Express service, which was removed due to mechanical defects in the trainsets
Morning Executive	Washington, D.C. – New Haven	November 14, 1971	June 10, 1972	
Metropolitan	Washington, D.C. – New York City	April 26, 1981		
Midday Congressional ‡	Washington, D.C. – New York City	May 1, 1971	November 13, 1971	
Minute Man	Philadelphia – Boston	June 12, 1972	April 29, 1973	
Minute Man	Washington, D.C. – Boston	April 29, 1973	October 28, 1995	Merged into NortheastDirect
Morning Liberty Express	Philadelphia – Boston	April 30, 1978	October 27, 1979	
Mount Vernon ‡	Washington, D.C. – New York City	May 1, 1971	November 13, 1971	
Mount Vernon ‡	Washington, D.C. – New York City	February 15, 1976	June 14, 1976	Replaced by the Colonial
Mount Vernon ‡	Washington, D.C. – New York City	April 27, 1980		
Murray Hill ‡	New York City – Boston	May 1, 1971	November 13, 1971	
Murray Hill ‡	Washington, D.C. – New York City	October 28, 1973	October 28, 1978	
Murray Hill ‡	Philadelphia – New York City	October 28, 1979	October 24, 1981	Renamed Clocker
Narragansett	New York City – Boston	November 14, 1971	October 27, 1973	
Narragansett	Philadelphia – Boston	February 15, 1976	June 11, 1976	
New England Express	Richmond – Boston	April 2, 1995	October 28, 1995	Replaced Old Dominion and Virginian; merged into NortheastDirect
New England Metroliner	New York City – Boston	October 31, 1982	April 28, 1984	
New England Zip				
New Englander	Philadelphia – Boston	May 19, 1974	October 25, 1975	
New Jerseyan				
New York Executive				
New Yorker ‡	New York City – Boston	May 1, 1971	November 13, 1971	
New Yorker ‡	Washington, D.C. – New York City	April 29, 1973	October 31, 1976	
New Yorker ‡	Philadelphia – New York City	October 28, 1979	October 24, 1981	Renamed Clocker
New Yorker ‡	Washington, D.C. – New York City	October 25, 1981		
Nightcap	Washington, D.C. – New York City	November 14, 1971	June 10, 1972	
Nightcap	Washington, D.C. – New York City	October 28, 1973	February 14, 1976	
Night Owl	Washington, D.C. – Boston	June 12, 1972	July 10, 1997	Replaced by Twilight Shoreliner
NortheastDirect	Newport News – Springfield/Boston	October 28, 1995	September 29, 2001	Replaced numerous trains; replaced by Acela Regional from 2000 to 2001.
Northeast Regional †	Newport News – Springfield/Boston	June 23, 2008	September 30, 2009	Renamed from Regional
Northeast Regional †	Lynchburg/Newport News – Springfield/Boston	October 1, 2009	December 11, 2012	Renamed from Regional
Northeast Regional †	Lynchburg/Newport News/Norfolk – Springfield/Boston	December 12, 2012	October 30, 2017	Renamed from Regional
Northeast Regional †	Newport News/Norfolk/Roanoke – Springfield/Boston	October 31, 2017	present	Renamed from Regional
Nutmeg State	Washington, D.C. – Springfield		October 28, 1995	Merged into NortheastDirect
Old Dominion	Newport News – New York City	October 25, 1992	April 2, 1995	Replaced Colonial; replaced by New England Express
Old Dominion	Richmond – New York City	April 2, 1995	September 2, 1995	Replaced by Manhattan Express
Old Dominion	Richmond – Springfield	September 2, 1995	October 28, 1995	Replaced a New England Express frequency; merged into NortheastDirect
Old Dominion	Newport News – Boston	November 10, 1996	May 16, 1999	Replaced an unnamed NortheastDirect train; merged back into NortheastDirect
Patriot ‡	Washington, D.C. – Boston	May 1, 1971	October 28, 1995	Merged into NortheastDirect
Philadelphian	Philadelphia – New York City	October 28, 1979	October 24, 1981	Previously unnamed; renamed Clocker
Pilgrim	Philadelphia – Boston	October 28, 1973	February 15, 1976	
Pilgrim	New York City – Boston	February 15, 1976	April 29, 1978	
Potomac	Washington, D.C. – Boston	October 25, 1981	April 27, 1985	
Potomac	Newport News – New York City	April 28, 1985	September 17, 1988	
Potomac	Washington, D.C. – Springfield	September 18, 1988		
President ‡	Washington, D.C. – New York City	May 1, 1971	November 13, 1971	
Quaker	Philadelphia – Boston	October 28, 1973	May 18, 1974	
Quaker City	Philadelphia – New York City	October 28, 1979	October 24, 1981	Renamed Clocker
Quaker City	Philadelphia – New York City		October 28, 1995	Merged into NortheastDirect
Regional	Newport News – Springfield/Boston	March 17, 2003	June 22, 2008	Renamed from Acela Regional; renamed Northeast Regional
Representative ‡	Washington, D.C. – New York City	May 1, 1971	November 13, 1971	
Rittenhouse	Philadelphia – New York City	October 28, 1979	October 24, 1981	Renamed Clocker
Schuylkill	Philadelphia – New York City	October 28, 1979	April 26, 1980	
Senator ‡	Washington, D.C. – Boston	May 1, 1971	October 24, 1981	From May 1, 1977, to July 30, 1978, Sunday service ran from Newport News to replace the Colonial
Senator ‡	Washington, D.C. – Boston		October 28, 1995	Merged into NortheastDirect
Shoreliner	New York City – Boston	January 6, 1974	May 19, 1974	Replaced by Flying Yankee
Shoreliner	New York City – Boston	October 28, 1979		
Statesman	Washington, D.C. – Boston	October 28, 1973	February 14, 1977	
Sundown	Washington, D.C. – Boston	October 28, 1973	February 14, 1976	
Sundown	New York City – Boston	February 15, 1976	April 26, 1978	
Tidewater	Newport News – New York City	June 30, 1978	October 28, 1995	Merged into NortheastDirect
Tidewater	Richmond – New York City	November 10, 1996	May 10, 1999	Replaced unnamed NortheastDirect train. A southbound trip ran to Newport News until 1997. Merged back into NortheastDirect.
Tidewater Express	Boston – Newport News	September 10, 1995	October 28, 1995	Replaced northbound New England Express; merged into NortheastDirect
Times Square	Washington, D.C. – New York City	April 26, 1981	October 24, 1981	Replaced by Herald Square
Turbo	Providence – Boston	October 29, 1972	April 28, 1973	
Turboservice ‡	New York City – Boston	May 1, 1971	November 13, 1971	
Turbo Yankee Clipper	New York City – Boston	November 14, 1971	October 29, 1972	Renamed Yankee Clipper Turbo
Turbo York Clipper	New York City – Boston	November 14, 1971	January 16, 1972	Renamed Turbo Yankee Clipper
Twilight Shoreliner	Newport News – Boston	July 10, 1997	April 28, 2003	Replaced the Night Owl, replaced by the Federal
Valley Forge	Philadelphia – Boston	November 14, 1971	June 12, 1972	
Valley Forge	Washington, D.C. – Boston	June 12, 1972	April 29, 1973	
Valley Forge	Philadelphia – New Haven	April 29, 1973	October 29, 1973	
Valley Forge	Harrisburg – New York City	October 29, 1973	March 30, 1990	Renamed Keystone State Express
Valley Forge	Boston – Harrisburg	May 19, 1974	October 25, 1975	Additional weekend-only service
Valley Flyer †	New Haven - Greenfield	August 30, 2019	present	
Verrazano	Washington, D.C. – New York City	October 25, 1981	October 28, 1995	Merged into NortheastDirect
Virginian	Richmond – New York City	October 28, 1984	April 2, 1995	Renamed as Chesapeake southbound and New England Express northbound
Virginian	Richmond – New York City	November 10, 1996	May 16, 1999	Replaced unnamed NortheastDirect train; merged back into NortheastDirect. Friday southbound trip ran to Newport News.
Wall Street	Washington, D.C. – New York City			
Washington Executive	Washington, D.C. – New York City	October 28, 1984	April 26, 1986	Washington–New York section of the Night Owl; renamed Executive Sleeper
Washington Express	Washington, D.C. – New York City		October 28, 1995	Merged into NortheastDirect
Weekend Metroliner	Washington, D.C. – New York City			
William Penn	Philadelphia – New York City	October 28, 1979	October 24, 1981	Renamed Clocker
Yankee Clipper ‡	New York City – Boston	May 1, 1971	November 13, 1971	
Yankee Clipper ‡	New York City – Boston	August 15, 1973	February 15, 1976	
Yankee Clipper ‡	New York City – Providence	February 15, 1976	September 9, 1976	
Yankee Clipper ‡	Washington, D.C. – Boston	October 28, 1979	October 28, 1995	Merged into NortheastDirect
Yankee Clipper Turbo	New York City – Boston	October 29, 1972	August 14, 1973	Renamed from Turbo Yankee Clipper

=== Empire Corridor ===
Trains operating over the Empire Corridor (the former New York Central Railroad Water Level Route) are now collectively known as the Empire Service. The name was used by the New York Central beginning in 1967, but dropped by Amtrak in 1971. Amtrak restored the Empire Service brand with the June 11, 1972, timetable, and added individual train names on the May 19, 1974, timetable. As was done on the Northeast Corridor with NortheastDirect, individual train names for New York-Albany and New York-Niagara Falls service were dropped on October 28, 1995, and replaced with Empire. The individual names were re-added in November 1996, but dropped in favor of Empire Service in May 1999.

Name	Route	Service began	Service ended	Notes
Adirondack †	New York City – Montreal	August 6, 1974	May 1, 1995	Joint operation with Empire State Express/DeWitt Clinton until April 1975
Adirondack †	Washington, D.C. – Montreal	May 2, 1995	May 12, 1996	
Adirondack †	New York City – Montreal	May 14, 1996	present	
Bear Mountain	New York City – Albany	February 15, 1977	May 29, 1978	
Bear Mountain	New York City – Albany	August 3, 1980	October 25, 1980	
Bear Mountain	New York City – Albany	May 26, 1981		Renamed from Henry Hudson
Capital City Express				
Catskill	New York City – Albany	October 27, 1991	October 30, 1993	
Catskill	New York City – Schenectady	October 31, 1993	May 4, 1994	
Catskill	New York City – Syracuse	May 5, 1994	October 29, 1994	
Catskill	New York City – Albany	October 30, 1994	May 1, 1995	
Catskill	New York City – Niagara Falls	May 2, 1995	October 27, 1995	Merged into Empire Service
Cayuga	New York City – Schenectady	October 28, 1984	May 4, 1987	
Central Park	New York City – Albany	May 2, 1995	October 27, 1995	Merged into Empire Service
DeWitt Clinton	New York City – Albany	May 19, 1974	April 25, 1981	Previously unnamed; replaced by Rip Van Winkle
Electric City Express	New York City – Schenectady	May 26, 1981		Replaced Salt City Express
Empire Service †‡	New York City – Buffalo	May 1, 1971	May 18, 1977	Inherited from PC Empire Service; unnamed until June 11, 1972. Individual names applied on May 19, 1974.
Empire Service †‡	New York City – Niagara Falls	October 28, 1995	present	Merged from various individual train names. Individual names restored under the Empire Service brand from November 1996 to May 1999.
Empire State Express	New York City – Buffalo	May 19, 1974	October 30, 1974	Previously unnamed
Empire State Express	New York City – Detroit	October 31, 1974	April 24, 1976	Renamed Niagara Rainbow
Empire State Express	New York City – Buffalo	January 8, 1978	October 28, 1978	Renamed from Water Level Express
Empire State Express	New York City – Niagara Falls	October 29, 1978		
Ethan Allen Express †	New York City – Rutland	December 2, 1996	June 28, 2022	
Ethan Allen Express †	New York City – Burlington	June 29, 2022	present	
Half Moon	New York City – Albany	May 1, 1994	October 27, 1995	
Hendrick Hudson	New York City – Albany			
Henry Hudson	New York City – Albany	May 19, 1974	April 25, 1981	Previously unnamed; renamed Bear Mountain
Hudson Highlander	New York City – Albany	May 26, 1981	October 27, 1995	Replaced Washington Irving; merged into Empire Service
Hudson River Express	New York City – Albany			
Hudson Valley Express	New York City – Schenectady			
Hudson Valley Service	New York City – Albany			
Knickerbocker	New York City – Albany	April 7, 1991	May 1, 1995	
Lake Shore	New York City – Chicago	May 10, 1971	January 6, 1972	Unnamed until November 14, 1971.
Lake Shore Limited †	New York City/Boston – Chicago	October 31, 1975	present	
Maple Leaf †	New York City – Toronto	May 26, 1981	present	
Mohawk	New York City – Niagara Falls	May 26, 1981	April 28, 1984	
Mohawk	New York City – Syracuse	April 29, 1984	October 27, 1984	
Mohawk	New York City – Niagara Falls	October 28, 1984		
Niagara Rainbow	New York City – Detroit	April 25, 1976	January 30, 1979	Renamed from Empire State Express
Niagara Rainbow	New York City – Niagara Falls	January 31, 1979		
Niagara Rainbow	New York City – Toronto	June 1994	September 10, 1995	Once-weekly additional frequency of the Maple Leaf
Nieuw Amsterdam	New York City – Albany			
Oneida	New York City – Syracuse			
Palisades	New York City – Albany			
Patroon	New York City – Albany			
Rip Van Winkle	New York City – Albany	May 26, 1981		
Salt City Express	New York City – Syracuse	May 19, 1974	April 25, 1981	Previously unnamed; replaced by Electric City Express
Saratogian	New York City – Saratoga Springs			
Sleepy Hollow	New York City – Albany			
Spa Express	New York City – Saratoga Springs			
Spuyten Duyvil	New York City – Albany			
Storm King	New York City – Albany	May 26, 1981		
Storm King	New York City – Schenectady			
Washington Irving	New York City – Albany	November 15, 1974	January 31, 1981	
Washington Irving	New York City – Schenectady	February 1, 1981	April 25, 1981	Replaced by Hudson Highlander
Water Level Express	New York City – Buffalo	May 19, 1974	January 7, 1978	Previously unnamed; renamed Empire State Express
Water Level Express	New York City – Niagara Falls			
Unnamed (#483/484)	Albany – Schenectady	February 1, 1981	April 25, 1981	Equipment positioning moves for the Washington Irving

=== Keystone Corridor ===
Trains providing local intercity service on the Philadelphia to Harrisburg Main Line (the former Pennsylvania Railroad main line) to Harrisburg are now collectively known as the Keystone Service, a name originally introduced in 1981. From 1990 to 2006, individual trains were listed in timetables as Keystone, a name also applied to two different trains in 1971–72 and 1979–81. This table includes only trains that did not operate west of Harrisburg.

Name	Route	Service began	Service ended	Notes
Atlantic City Express	Atlantic City – Harrisburg	April 7, 1991	April 1, 1995	One of three branches of the service
Big Apple	New York City – Harrisburg	April 27, 1980	April 30, 1994	Weekend-only extension of a Clocker; merged into Keystone Service
Keystone	New York City – Harrisburg	April 27, 1980	October 24, 1981	Weekend-only extension of a Clocker; renamed Susquehanna
Keystone Executive	Philadelphia – Harrisburg	April 24, 1983	1986	Replaced a Keystone Service train; discontinued during cuts to corridor service
Keystone Service †	Philadelphia – Harrisburg	October 25, 1981	October 29, 1994	Renamed from Silverliner Service; some trains extended to New York beginning in 1994
Keystone Service †	New York City – Harrisburg	October 30, 1994	present	
Keystone State Express	New York City – Harrisburg	April 1, 1990	Mid-1990s	Replaced Valley Forge; merged into Keystone Service
Metroliner	Downingtown – Washington, D.C.	April 1, 1990	October 26, 1991	A single one-way trip, #201, was the only Metroliner service ever operated off the Northeast Corridor
Silverliner Service ‡	Philadelphia (Suburban) – Harrisburg	October 29, 1972	October 24, 1981	Replaced unnamed Penn Central 600-series trains; renamed Keystone Service
Susquehanna	New York City – Harrisburg	October 25, 1981	October 29, 1994	Replaced Keystone; merged into Keystone Service
Valley Forge	New York City – Harrisburg	October 28, 1973	March 30, 1990	Renamed Keystone State Express
Valley Forge	Boston – Harrisburg	May 19, 1974	October 25, 1975	Additional weekend-only service

This listing includes trains operating over the full length of the Keystone Corridor to Pittsburgh. Some trains have offered connections at 30th Street Station while others only stopped at North Philadelphia; most have not offered local service east of Harrisburg. Since 2005, the Pennsylvanian is the only train to operate between Harrisburg and Pittsburgh.

Name	Route	Service began	Service ended	Notes
Broadway Limited ‡	Chicago – New York City	May 1, 1971	September 9, 1995	Inherited from PC Broadway Limited; replaced by the Three Rivers
Duquesne ‡	Pittsburgh – New York City	May 1, 1971	November 14, 1971	Inherited from PC Duquesne; renamed Keystone
Fort Pitt	Pittsburgh – Altoona	April 26, 1981	January 30, 1983	
Keystone	Pittsburgh – New York City	November 14, 1971	April 29, 1972	Renamed from Duquesne
National Limited	Kansas City – New York City	July 12, 1971	October 1, 1979	Renamed from Spirit of St. Louis
Pennsylvanian †	Pittsburgh – Philadelphia	April 27, 1980	October 29, 1983	
Pennsylvanian †	Pittsburgh – New York City	October 30, 1983	November 6, 1998	
Pennsylvanian †	Chicago – New York City	November 7, 1998	January 26, 2003	
Pennsylvanian †	Pittsburgh – New York City	January 27, 2003	October 31, 2004	Merged with Three Rivers
Pennsylvanian †	Pittsburgh – New York City	March 8, 2005	present	Replaced Three Rivers
Spirit of St. Louis ‡	Kansas City – New York City	May 1, 1971	July 11, 1971	Inherited from the PC//MP Spirit of St. Louis; renamed National Limited
Three Rivers	Chicago – New York City	September 10, 1995	March 7, 2005	Replaced the Broadway Limited; replaced by Pennsylvanian

=== Northeast ===
These routes operated in the Northeastern United States. Empire Corridor, Keystone Corridor, and Northeast Corridor routes are not included in this table.

Name	Route	Service began	Service ended	Notes
Atlantic City Express	Washington, D.C. – Atlantic City	May 21, 1989	April 1, 1995	Replaced by the NJ Transit Atlantic City Line
Atlantic City Express	New York City–Atlantic City	May 21, 1989	April 1, 1995	Replaced by the NJ Transit Atlantic City Line
Cape Codder	New York City – Hyannis	May 3, 1986	September 29, 1996	Seasonal service
Downeaster †	Boston – Portland	December 15, 2001	November 1, 2012	
Downeaster †	Boston – Brunswick	November 1, 2012	present	
Montrealer	Washington, D.C. – Montreal	September 29, 1972	April 6, 1987	
Montrealer	Washington, D.C. – Montreal	July 18, 1989	April 1, 1995	Replaced by the Vermonter
Vermonter †	Washington, D.C. – St. Albans	April 2, 1995	present	Replaced the Montrealer
Washingtonian	Washington, D.C. – Montreal	September 29, 1972	May 19, 1974	Name given to southbound Montrealer

=== South ===
Name	Route	Service began	Service ended	Notes
Auto Train †	Lorton – Sanford	October 30, 1983	present	
Carolina Coast	New York City – Savannah	June 11, 1972	September 10, 1972	
Carolina Special	New York City – Jacksonville	June 15, 1973	September 3, 1973	
Carolinian †	New York City – Charlotte	October 28, 1984	September 1, 1985	Section of Palmetto, split in Richmond
Carolinian †	New York City – Charlotte	May 12, 1990	present	Section of Palmetto splitting in Rocky Mount until 1991
Champion ‡	New York City – St. Petersburg	May 1, 1971	October 1, 1979	Inherited from the PC/RF&P/SCL Champion. Consolidated with the Silver Meteor.
Crescent †‡	New York City – New Orleans	February 1, 1979	present	Conveyed from the Southern Railway's Southern Crescent.
Florida Special ‡	New York City – Miami	December 17, 1971	April 14, 1972	Replaced by the Vacationer for the 1972–1973 season.
Floridian	Chicago – Miami/St. Petersburg	November 14, 1971	October 7, 1979	Replaced the South Wind
Floridian †	Chicago – Miami	November 10, 2024	present	Temporarily replaces the Capitol Limited and Silver Star.
Gulf Breeze	New York City – Mobile	October 27, 1989	April 1, 1995	Through operation with the Crescent.
Gulf Coast Limited	New Orleans – Mobile	April 29, 1984	January 6, 1985	
Gulf Coast Limited	New Orleans – Mobile	June 28, 1996	March 31, 1997	
Mardi Gras Service	New Orleans – Mobile	August 18, 2025	present	
Meteor	Boston – Miami/St. Petersburg	June 11, 1972	September 10, 1972	Joint operation of Silver Meteor and Champion.
Miamian	New York City – Miami	December 15, 1974	January 10, 1975	Replaced the Vacationer.
Palmetto †	New York City – Savannah	June 15, 1976	December, 1988	
Palmetto †	New York City – Jacksonville	December, 1988	October, 1994	
Palmetto †	New York City – Tampa	October 1994	February 1, 1995	Replaced the Silver Meteor's Tampa section.
Palmetto †	New York City – Miami	May 1, 2002	November 1, 2004	Renamed from the Silver Palm.
Palmetto †	New York City – Savannah	November 1, 2004	present	
Piedmont †	Raleigh – Charlotte	May 25, 1995	present	
Silver Meteor †‡	New York City – Miami	May 1, 1971	June 11, 1972	Inherited from the PC/RF&P/SCL Silver Meteor. Renamed Meteor.
Silver Meteor †‡	New York City – Miami	September 10, 1972	present	Renamed from the Meteor.
Silver Palm	Miami – Tampa	November 21, 1982	April 30, 1985	
Silver Palm	New York City – Miami	November 10 1996	May 1, 2002	Renamed the Palmetto
Silver Star ‡	New York City – Miami	May 1, 1971	November 10, 2024	Inherited from the PC/RF&P/SCL Silver Star.
South Wind	Chicago – Miami/St. Petersburg	May 1, 1971	November 14, 1971	Inherited from the PC/L&N/SCL South Wind; replaced by the Floridian
Vacationer	New York City – Miami	December 15, 1972	April 27, 1974	Seasonal operation; replaced the Florida Special. Replaced by the Miamian for the 1974 – 1975 season.

=== Northeast – Midwest ===
These routes operated from the Northeast to the Midwest. Routes that ran via the Empire Corridor or Keystone Corridor are also listed in those tables.

Name	Route	Service began	Service ended	Notes
Blue Ridge	Washington, D.C. – Cumberland	May 7, 1973	October 30, 1976	Curtailed from the Potomac Special; merged into MARC Brunswick Line.
Blue Ridge	Washington, D.C. – Martinsburg	October 31, 1976	1986	Curtailed from the Potomac Special; merged into MARC Brunswick Line.
Broadway Limited ‡	New York City – Chicago	May 1, 1971	September 10, 1995	Inherited from the PC Broadway Limited; replaced by the Three Rivers
Capitol Limited	Washington, D.C. – Chicago	October 1, 1981	November 10, 2024	
Cardinal †	Washington, D.C. – Chicago	October 30, 1977	April 25, 1981	Renamed from the James Whitcomb Riley.
Cardinal †	New York City – Chicago	April 26, 1981	September 30, 1981	
Cardinal †	New York City – Chicago	January 8, 1982	present	
Empire State Express	New York City – Detroit	October 31, 1974	April 25, 1976	Previously an Empire Corridor service; renamed the Niagara Rainbow.
George Washington ‡	Washington, D.C./Newport News – Cincinnati	May 1, 1971	November 14, 1971	Inherited from C&O George Washington; merged with the James Whitcomb Riley
George Washington ‡	Washington, D.C./Newport News – Chicago	November 14, 1971	May 19, 1974	Eastbound service only - westbound train named James Whitcomb Riley.
Hilltopper	Washington, D.C. – Catlettsburg	May 31, 1977	January 8, 1978	Replaced the Mountaineer.
Hilltopper	Boston – Catlettsburg	January 8, 1978	October 1, 1979	Combined with the Night Owl
James Whitcomb Riley ‡	Cincinnati – Chicago	May 1, 1971	November 14, 1971	Inherited from the PC James Whitcomb Riley; merged with the George Washington
James Whitcomb Riley ‡	Washington, D.C./Newport News – Chicago	November 14, 1971	June 14, 1976	Eastbound service retained the George Washington name until May 19, 1974. Newport News section replaced by the Colonial.
James Whitcomb Riley ‡	Washington, D.C. – Chicago	June 14, 1976	October 30, 1977	Renamed Cardinal.
Lake Shore	New York City – Chicago	May 10, 1971	January 6, 1972	Unnamed until November 14, 1971.
Lake Shore Limited †	New York City/Boston – Chicago	October 31, 1975	present	
Mountaineer	Norfolk – Chicago	March 25, 1975	May 31, 1977	Replaced by the Hilltopper.
National Limited	New York City/Washington, D.C. – Kansas City	November 14, 1971	October 1, 1979	Renamed from Spirit of St. Louis.
Niagara Rainbow	New York City – Detroit	April 25, 1976	January 30, 1979	Renamed from the Empire State Express; cut back as an Empire Corridor train post-1979.
Pennsylvanian †	Pittsburgh – Philadelphia	April 27, 1980	October 29, 1983	
Pennsylvanian †	Pittsburgh – New York City	October 30, 1983	November 6, 1998	
Pennsylvanian †	Chicago – New York City	November 7, 1998	January 26, 2003	
Pennsylvanian †	Pittsburgh – New York City	January 27, 2003	October 31, 2004	Merged with Three Rivers
Pennsylvanian †	Pittsburgh – New York City	March 8, 2005	present	Replaced Three Rivers
Potomac Special	Washington, D.C. – Parkersburg	May 14, 1972	May 6, 1973	Renamed from the Potomac Turbo; renamed the Blue Ridge.
Potomac Turbo	Washington, D.C. – Parkersburg	February 7, 1972	May 14, 1972	Renamed from the West Virginian; renamed the Potomac Special.
Shenandoah	Washington, D.C. – Cincinnati	October 31, 1976	September 30, 1981	
Spirit of St. Louis ‡	New York City/Washington, D.C. – Kansas City	May 1, 1971	November 14, 1971	Inherited from PC/MP Spirit of St. Louis; renamed National Limited
Three Rivers	New York City – Pittsburgh	September 11, 1995	November 9, 1996	Replaced the Broadway Limited.
Three Rivers	New York City – Chicago	November 10, 1996	March 7, 2005	
West Virginian	Washington, D.C. – Parkersburg	September 8, 1971	February 7, 1972	Renamed the Potomac Turbo.

Additionally, Amtrak listed a Philadelphia to Chicago train named the Skyline Connection in its Spring 2000 national timetable, but the service never operated.

=== Midwest ===
Name	Route	Service began	Service ended	Notes
Abraham Lincoln ‡	Chicago – St. Louis	May 1, 1971	November 14, 1971	Inherited from GM&O Abraham Lincoln
Abraham Lincoln ‡	Milwaukee – St. Louis	November 14, 1971	September 30, 1971	Replaced by Turboliner
Abraham Lincoln ‡	Chicago – St. Louis	October 26, 1975	January 8, 1978	Replaced one Turboliner round trip; replaced by the Ann Rutledge.
Ann Rutledge	Chicago – St. Louis	February 15, 1976	October 30, 1976	Replaced Turboliner; replaced by an extension of the Inter-American.
Ann Rutledge	Chicago – Kansas City	January 8, 1978	October 29, 2006	Replaced Abraham Lincoln; St. Louis–Chicago portion replaced by Lincoln Service
Ann Rutledge	St. Louis – Kansas City	October 30, 2006	January 28, 2009	Renamed Missouri River Runner.
Arrowhead	Minneapolis – Superior	April 16, 1975	February 15, 1977	
Arrowhead	Minneapolis – Duluth	February 15, 1977	April 30, 1978	Replaced by the North Star
Badger	Chicago – Milwaukee	October 28, 1984	October 29, 1989	Renamed Hiawatha.
Black Hawk	Chicago – Dubuque	February 14, 1974	September 30, 1981	
Blue Water †	Chicago – Port Huron	September 15, 1974	October 26, 1975	Renamed Blue Water Limited.
Blue Water †	Chicago – Port Huron	April 25, 2004	present	Replaced the International Limited.
Blue Water Limited	Chicago – Port Huron	October 26, 1975	June 15, 1976	Replaced the Blue Water; replaced by Turboliner.
Blue Water Limited	Chicago – Port Huron	October 31, 1976	October 31, 1982	Replaced Turboliner; replaced by the International Limited.
Borealis †	Chicago – St. Paul	May 21, 2024	present	
Calumet ‡	Chicago – Valparaiso	October 29, 1979	May 3, 1991	Inherited from Conrail commuter service; unnamed until August 3, 1980.
Campus	Chicago – Champaign	November 14, 1971	March 5, 1972	
Carl Sandburg †	Chicago – Quincy	October 30, 2006	present	
City of New Orleans †‡	Chicago – New Orleans	May 1, 1971	November 14, 1971	Inherited from the IC City of New Orleans; replaced by the Panama Limited.
City of New Orleans †‡	Chicago – New Orleans	February 1, 1981	present	Renamed from the Panama Limited.
Eagle	Chicago – San Antonio	October 2, 1981	November 14, 1988	Replaced the Inter-American; renamed Texas Eagle.
Eagle	Chicago – St. Louis	November 15, 1988	January 20, 1990	
Encore	Chicago – Milwaukee	October 28, 1984	April 28, 1985	
Heartland Flyer †	Oklahoma City – Fort Worth	June 15, 1999	present	
Hiawatha	Chicago – Minneapolis	November 14, 1971	January 16, 1972	Renamed Twin Cities Hiawatha.
Hiawatha	Chicago – Minneapolis	October 29, 1972	May 19, 1974	Replaced by the North Coast Hiawatha.
Hiawatha †‡	Chicago – Milwaukee	May 1, 1971	June 15, 1976	Inherited from MILW Milwaukee Express; unnamed until October 29, 1972. Replaced by Turboliner.
Hiawatha †‡	Chicago – Milwaukee	October 29, 1989	present	Renamed from the Badger, LaSalle, Nicollet and Radisson.
Hoosier State	Chicago – Indianapolis	October 1, 1980	September 8, 1995	
Hoosier State	Chicago – Indianapolis	July 19, 1998	December 17, 1999	Replaced by the Kentucky Cardinal.
Hoosier State	Chicago – Indianapolis	July 6, 2003	June 30, 2019	Replaced the Kentucky Cardinal.
Illini †	Chicago – Champaign	November 14, 1971	March 3, 1972	
Illini †	Chicago – Champaign	December 19, 1973	July 1, 1981	
Illini †	Chicago – Decatur	July 2, 1981	July 9, 1983	
Illini †	Chicago – Champaign	July 10, 1983	January 11, 1986	
Illini †	Chicago – Carbondale	January 12, 1986	present	Replaced the Shawnee.
Illinois Zephyr	Chicago – West Quincy	November 14, 1971	April 30, 1994	
Illinois Zephyr	Chicago – Quincy	May 1, 1994	present	
Indiana Connection ‡	Chicago – Valparaiso	October 29, 1979	January 10, 1986	Inherited from Conrail commuter service; unnamed until August 3, 1980.
Inter-American	Chicago – Laredo	January 28, 1973	October 2, 1981	Renamed Eagle
International	Chicago – Toronto	June 13, 1983	April 25, 2004	Renamed from International Limited; replaced by the Blue Water
International Limited	Chicago – Toronto	October 31, 1982	June 13, 1983	Replaced the Blue Water Limited; renamed International
Kansas City Mule	St. Louis – Kansas City	October 26, 1980	April 1, 1995	
Kansas City Mule	St. Louis – Kansas City	July 1, 1995	January 27, 2009	Replaced by Missouri River Runner
Kentucky Cardinal	Chicago – Louisville	December 17, 1999	July 5, 2003	Replaced and replaced by the Hoosier State.
Lake Cities	Chicago – Toledo	August 3, 1980	April 1, 1995	Renamed from St. Clair
Lake Cities	Chicago – Pontiac	April 2, 1995	April 28, 2001	
Lake Cities	Chicago – Detroit	April 29, 2001	April 28, 2002	
Lake Cities	Chicago – Pontiac	April 29, 2002	April 25, 2004	Renamed Wolverine
Lake Country Limited	Chicago – Janesville	June 15, 2000	September 22, 2001	
LaSalle	Chicago – Milwaukee	October 26, 1980	October 29, 1989	Replaced Turboliner; replaced by Hiawatha
Limited ‡	Chicago – St. Louis	May 1, 1971	November 14, 1971	Inherited from the GM&O Limited; replaced by the Prairie State
Lincoln Service †	Chicago – St. Louis	October 30, 2006	present	Replaced the State House and the St. Louis– portion of the Ann Rutledge
Lone Star	Chicago – Houston	May 19, 1974	October 8, 1979	Renamed from Texas Chief
Loop	Chicago – Springfield	April 27, 1986	June 30, 1996	
Marquette	Chicago – Milwaukee	October 26, 1980	October 28, 1984	Replaced Turboliner; renamed Nicolette and Radisson
Michigan Executive ‡	Detroit – Jackson	January 20, 1975	June 13, 1982	Inherited from PC commuter service
Michigan Executive ‡	Detroit – Ann Arbor	June 14, 1982	January 13, 1984	Inherited from PC commuter service
Missouri River Runner †	St. Louis – Kansas City	January 28, 2009	present	Renamed from the Ann Rutledge, Kansas City Mule, and St. Louis Mule
Nicollet	Chicago – Milwaukee	October 26, 1980	October 29, 1989	Replaced Turboliner; replaced by Hiawatha
North Star	Chicago – Duluth	April 30, 1978	April 7, 1985	Renamed from the Arrowhead
Panama Limited	Chicago – New Orleans	November 14, 1971	February 1, 1981	Renamed from and renamed City of New Orleans
Pere Marquette †	Chicago – Grand Rapids	August 4, 1984	present	
Prairie Marksman	Chicago – East Peoria	August 10, 1980	October 4, 1981	
Prairie State	Milwaukee – St. Louis	November 14, 1971	October 1, 1973	Replaced the Limited; replaced by Turboliner
Radisson	Chicago – Milwaukee	October 26, 1980	October 29, 1989	Replaced Turboliner; replaced by Hiawatha
River Cities	Kansas City – New Orleans	April 29, 1984	November 4, 1993	
Saluki †	Chicago – Carbondale	October 30, 2006	present	
St. Clair ‡	Chicago – Detroit	May 1, 1971	May 10, 1975	Inherited from PC Twilight Limited/Michigan; replaced by Turboliner
St. Clair ‡	Chicago – Detroit	June 15, 1976	August 2, 1980	Replaced Turboliner; replaced by Lake Cities
St. Louis Mule	St. Louis – Kansas City	October 26, 1980	April 1, 1995	
St. Louis Mule	St. Louis – Kansas City	July 1, 1995	January 27, 2009	Replaced by Missouri River Runner
Shawnee ‡	Chicago – Carbondale	May 1, 1971	January 11, 1986	Replaced by Illini
State House	Chicago – St. Louis	October 1, 1973	October 30, 2006	Renamed Lincoln Service
Texas Chief ‡	Chicago – Houston	May 1, 1971	May 18, 1974	Inherited from ATSF Texas Chief; renamed Lone Star
Texas Eagle †	Chicago – San Antonio	November 15, 1988	present	Renamed from the Eagle
Turboliner	Chicago – St. Louis	October 1, 1973	February 15, 1976	Replaced Abraham Lincoln and Prairie State; replaced by Abraham Lincoln and Ann Rutledge
Turboliner	Chicago – Detroit	May 10, 1975	October 31, 1976	Replaced and replaced by Wolverine and St. Clair
Turboliner	Chicago – Milwaukee	October 26, 1975	October 26, 1980	Replaced Hiawatha; replaced by LaSalle, Marquette, Nicollet and Radisson
Turboliner	Milwaukee – Detroit	October 26, 1975	June 15, 1976	
Turboliner	Chicago – Port Huron	June 15, 1976	October 31, 1976	Replaced and replaced by Blue Water Limited
Twilight Limited	Chicago – Detroit	October 31, 1976	May 4, 1994	Renamed from St. Clair
Twilight Limited	Chicago – Pontiac	May 5, 1994	May 20, 2000	
Twilight Limited	Chicago – Detroit	May 21, 2000	August 30, 2000	
Twilight Limited	Chicago – Pontiac	August 31, 2000	April 28, 2002	
Twilight Limited	Chicago – Detroit	April 29, 2002	April 27, 2003	
Twilight Limited	Chicago – Pontiac	April 28, 2003	April 25, 2004	Merged into Wolverine
Twin Cities Hiawatha	Chicago – Minneapolis	January 16, 1972	June 12, 1972	Replaced Hiawatha; replaced by North Coast Hiawatha
Twin Cities Hiawatha	Chicago – Minneapolis	September 8, 1977	April 30, 1978	Replaced by North Star
Wolverine †‡	Chicago – Detroit	May 1, 1971	May 10, 1975	Inherited from PC Wolverine; unnamed until November 14, 1971. Replaced by Turboliner
Wolverine †‡	Chicago – Detroit	June 15, 1976	May 4, 1994	Replaced Turboliner
Wolverine †‡	Chicago – Pontiac	May 5, 1994	present	
Weekender	Chicago – St. Louis	October 1, 1973	May 19, 1974	Replaced Abraham Lincoln and Prairie State; replaced by Turboliner

=== Midwest–West ===
Name	Route	Service began	Service ended	Notes
California Zephyr †	Chicago – Oakland	July 16, 1983	October 26, 1997	Replaced the San Francisco Zephyr. Temporarily cut to Emeryville from August 5, 1994, to May 12, 1995
California Zephyr †	Chicago – Emeryville	October 26, 1997	present	
Chief	Chicago – Los Angeles	June 11, 1972	September 10, 1972	
City of San Francisco ‡	Chicago – Oakland	May 1, 1971	June 10, 1972	Renamed San Francisco Zephyr
Denver Zephyr ‡	Chicago – Denver	May 1, 1971	June 10, 1973	Inherited from BN Denver Zephyr. Replaced by increased service on the San Francisco Zephyr.
Empire Builder †‡	Chicago – Seattle	May 1, 1971	October 24, 1981	Inherited from BN Empire Builder
Empire Builder †‡	Chicago – Portland/Seattle	October 25, 1981	present	
National Chief	Washington, D.C. – Los Angeles	—	—	Announced in 1996 as a through train combining the Southwest Chief and Capitol Limited, but never implemented
North Coast Hiawatha	Chicago – Seattle	June 5, 1971	October 7, 1979	Inherited from BN North Coast Limited; unnamed until November 14, 1971
San Francisco Zephyr	Chicago – Oakland	June 11, 1972	July 15, 1983	Renamed from City of San Francisco; replaced by the California Zephyr
Southwest Chief †	Chicago – Los Angeles	October 28, 1984	present	Renamed from Southwest Limited
Southwest Limited	Chicago – Los Angeles	May 19, 1974	October 28, 1984	Renamed from Super Chief; renamed Southwest Chief
Sunset Limited †‡	New Orleans – Los Angeles	May 1, 1971	April 4, 1993	Inherited from SP Sunset Limited, extended to Miami
Sunset Limited †‡	Miami – Los Angeles	April 4, 1993	November 10, 1996	Truncated to Sanford
Sunset Limited †‡	Sanford - Los Angeles	November 10, 1996	October 26, 1997	Extended to Orlando
Sunset Limited †‡	Orlando - Los Angeles	October 26, 1997	August 29, 2005	Truncated to San Antonio due to Hurricane Katrina
Sunset Limited †‡	San Antonio - Los Angeles	August 29, 2005	October 26, 2005	Extended to New Orleans
Sunset Limited †‡	New Orleans - Los Angeles	October 26, 2005	present	Service east of New Orleans suspended after Hurricane Katrina
Super Chief	Chicago – Los Angeles	April 19, 1973	May 19, 1974	Renamed from Super Chief/El Capitan; renamed Southwest Limited
Super Chief/El Capitan ‡	Chicago – Los Angeles	May 1, 1971	April 19, 1973	Inherited from ATSF Super Chief/El Capitan; renamed Super Chief

=== West ===
Name	Route	Service began	Service ended	Notes
Capitols	Roseville – San Jose	December 11, 1991	January 25, 1998	
Capitols	Colfax – San Jose	January 26, 1998	February 26, 2000	
Capitols	Auburn – San Jose	February 27, 2000	April 28, 2001	Renamed Capitol Corridor
Capitol Corridor †	Auburn – San Jose	April 29, 2001	present	Renamed from Capitols
Coast Daylight ‡	Oakland – Los Angeles	May 1, 1971	November 14, 1971	Inherited from SP Coast Daylight; unnamed until 1971. Joint operation with the Coast Starlight as Coast Starlight/Daylight.
Coast Daylight ‡	Oakland – San Diego	November 14, 1971	April 1972	Inherited from SP Coast Daylight; unnamed until 1971. Joint operation with the Coast Starlight as Coast Starlight/Daylight.
Coast Daylight ‡	Oakland – Los Angeles	April 1972	May 19, 1974	Inherited from SP Coast Daylight; unnamed until 1971. Joint operation with the Coast Starlight as Coast Starlight/Daylight.
Coast Starlight †‡	Seattle – San Diego	May 1, 1971	April 1972	Inherited from SP/BN Cascade, SP Coast Daylight, and ATSF San Diegan. Unnamed until 1971. Joint operation with the Coast Daylight as Coast Starlight/Daylight until 1974.
Coast Starlight †‡	Seattle – Los Angeles	April 1972	present	Inherited from SP/BN Cascade, SP Coast Daylight, and ATSF San Diegan. Unnamed until 1971. Joint operation with the Coast Daylight as Coast Starlight/Daylight until 1974.
Desert Wind	Ogden – Los Angeles	October 28, 1979	July 15, 1983	
Desert Wind	Salt Lake City – Los Angeles	July 15, 1983	May 10, 1997	
Expo '74	Seattle – Spokane	May 19, 1974	September 14, 1974	
Gold Runner †	Oakland/Sacramento – Bakersfield	November 3, 2025	present	Renamed from the San Joaquins
Las Vegas Limited	Las Vegas – Los Angeles	May 21, 1976	August 8, 1976	
Metroliner	Los Angeles – San Diego	April 29, 1984	April 28, 1985	
Orange County Commuter	Los Angeles – San Juan Capistrano	April 30, 1990	March 28, 1994	Replaced by Metrolink Orange County Line
Pacific Surfliner †	San Luis Obispo – San Diego	June 1, 2000	present	Renamed from the San Diegan
Pioneer	Seattle – Salt Lake City	June 7, 1977	June 16, 1991	
Pioneer	Seattle – Denver	June 17, 1991	May 10, 1997	
San Diegan ‡	Los Angeles – San Diego	May 1, 1971	June 25, 1988	Inherited from ATSF San Diegan; unnamed until November 14, 1971
San Diegan ‡	Santa Barbara – San Diego	June 26, 1988	April 1996	
San Diegan ‡	San Luis Obispo – San Diego	April 1996	May 31, 2000	Renamed Pacific Surfliner
San Joaquins ‡	Oakland – Bakersfield	March 5, 1974	May 15, 1999	
San Joaquins ‡	Oakland/Sacramento – Bakersfield	May 16, 1999	November 3, 2025	Renamed the Gold Runner
Spirit of California	Sacramento – Los Angeles	October 25, 1981	September 30, 1983	
Winter Park Express †	Denver – Winter Park Resort	March 13, 2015	present	

=== Cascades Corridor ===
All regional service between Vancouver, British Columbia and Eugene, Oregon has been known as Amtrak Cascades since 1998. Prior to this, individual trains or services had unique names. This table includes only trains that did not operate beyond the corridor.

Name	Route	Service began	Service ended	Notes
Amtrak Cascades †	Vancouver – Eugene	May 17, 1998	present	Replaced Cascadia, Mount Adams and Mount Baker International. Name did not appear until the 1998 timetable; service formally began in 1999.
Cascadia	Seattle – Eugene	October 29, 1995	May 16, 1998	Renamed from the Mount Rainier; merged into Amtrak Cascades
Mount Adams	Seattle – Portland	October 1, 1994	May 16, 1998	Replaced the Northwest Talgo; merged into Amtrak Cascades
Mount Baker International	Vancouver – Seattle	May 26, 1995	May 16, 1998	Merged into Amtrak Cascades
Mount Rainier ‡	Seattle – Portland	May 1, 1971	October 29, 1994	Inherited from an unnamed BN train; unnamed until 1971. Southbound ran to Eugene from 1980 to 1981 as the return from a Willamette Valley trip.
Mount Rainier ‡	Seattle – Eugene	October 30, 1994	October 29, 1995	Renamed Cascadia.
Northwest Talgo	Seattle – Portland	April 1, 1994	September 30, 1994	Replaced by the Mount Adams
Pacific International	Vancouver – Seattle	July 17, 1972	September 30, 1981	
Puget Sound ‡	Seattle – Portland	May 1, 1971	June 7, 1977	Inherited from an unnamed BN train; unnamed until November 14, 1971. Replaced by the Pioneer.
Willamette Valley	Portland – Eugene	August 3, 1980	December 31, 1981	

== See also ==
- List of North American named passenger trains
