= Acela =

Intercity rail service operated by Amtrak in the northeastern United States

- Acela passing Forest Hills station, in August 2025

Overview
- Service type: Inter-city, high speed tilting train
- Locale: Northeast megalopolis
- Predecessor: Metroliner
- First service: December 11, 2000
- Current operator: Amtrak
- Annual ridership: 3,153,621 (FY 25) ▼ -2.6% (Note: Amtrak's Fiscal Year (FY) runs from October 1 of the prior year to September 30 of the named year.)

Route
- Termini: Boston, Massachusetts; Washington, D.C.
- Stops: 14
- Distance travelled: 457 miles (735 km)
- Average journey time: 6 3/4 hours
- Service frequency: 32 per day
- Train number: 2100–2295

On-board services
- Classes: First Class; Business Class
- Disabled access: Fully accessible
- Seating arrangements: 4 across in business class 3 across in first class
- Catering facilities: Café; at-seat meals in first class
- Baggage facilities: Racks and overhead bins; no checked luggage

Technical
- Rolling stock: Acela Express; Avelia Liberty
- Track gauge: 4 ft 8 1/2 in (1,435 mm) standard gauge
- Electrification: Overhead line; 25 kV 60 Hz AC (Boston–New Haven); 12.5 kV 60 Hz AC (New Haven–New York); 12 kV 25 Hz AC (New York–Washington)
- Operating speed: Service: 150–160 mph (240–260 km/h); Average (incl. stops): 70 mph (113 km/h)
Route map
Acela route highlighted in blue
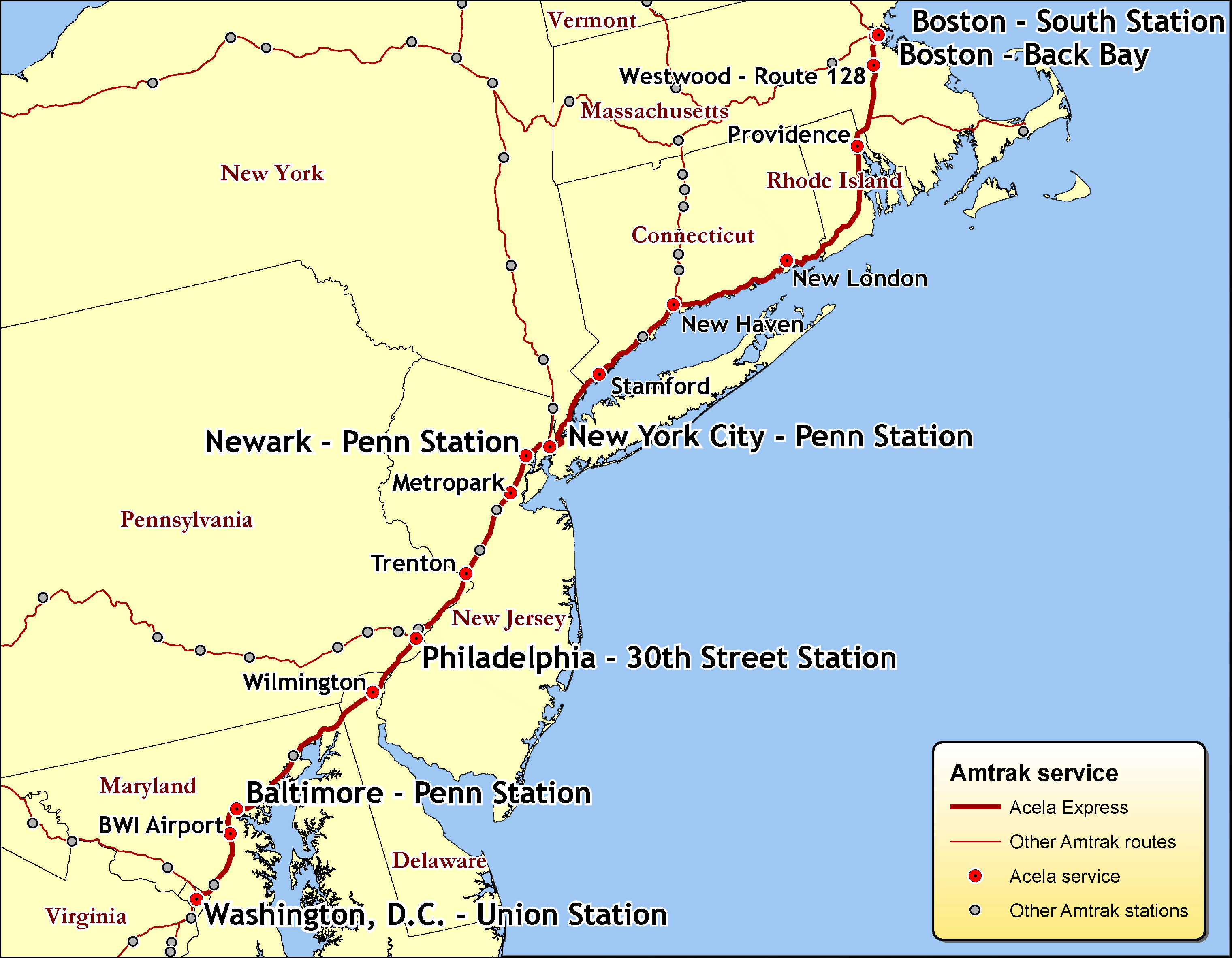

The Acela (/əˈsɛlə/ ə-SEL-ə; originally the Acela Express until September 2019) is Amtrak's flagship passenger train service along the Northeast Corridor (NEC) in the Northeastern United States between Washington, D.C., and Boston via 13 intermediate stops, including Baltimore, Philadelphia, New York City, and Providence. Acela trains are the fastest in the Americas, with a top speed of 160 miles per hour (260 km/h), qualifying as high-speed rail, but only for about 40 miles (64 km) of the 457-mile (735 km) route.

In fiscal year 2025, Acela carried more than 3.1 million passengers, second only to the slower and less expensive Northeast Regional, which had over 12 million passengers. Ridership was down from the pre-COVID-19 pandemic high of 3,557,455 passengers in 2019. Its 2025 revenue of $570 million was around 20.6% of Amtrak's total.

Acela operates along routes that are used by slower regional passenger traffic, and only reaches the maximum allowed speed of the tracks along some sections, with the fastest peak speed along segments between Mansfield, Massachusetts, and Richmond, Rhode Island, as well as between South Brunswick and Trenton, New Jersey. Acela trains use active tilting technology, which helps control lateral centrifugal force, allowing the train to travel at higher speeds on the sharply curved NEC without disturbing passengers. The high-speed operation occurs mostly along the 226-mile (364 km) route from Pennsylvania Station in New York City to Union Station in Washington, D.C., with a fastest scheduled time of 2 hours and 45 minutes and an average speed of 82 miles per hour (132 km/h), including time spent at intermediate stops. Over this route, Acela and the Northeast Regional service captured an 83% share of air/train commuters between New York and Washington in 2021, up from 37% in 2000.

The Acela's speed is limited by traffic and infrastructure on the route's northern half. On the 231-mile (372 km) section from Boston's South Station to New York's Penn Station, the fastest scheduled time is 3 hours and 30 minutes, or an average speed of 66 miles per hour (106 km/h). Along this section, Acela has captured a 54% share of the combined train and air market. The entire 457-mile (735 km) route from Boston to Washington takes between 6 hours, 38 minutes and 6 hours, 50 minutes, at an average speed of around 70 miles per hour (110 km/h).

In 2025, the original Acela Express equipment began to be replaced by new Avelia Liberty trainsets, which Amtrak markets as the NextGen Acela. The new trains have greater passenger capacity and an enhanced active tilt system that allows higher speeds on the many curved sections of the route. The first five trainsets entered passenger service on August 28, 2025, and as of August 2026, 16 of the total order of 28 trainsets have entered service.

== History ==
=== Background ===
Following the success of Japan's newly inaugurated Shinkansen network in the 1960s, the High Speed Ground Transportation Act of 1965 authorized the U.S. government to explore the creation of high-speed rail, which resulted in the introduction of the higher-speed Metroliner trains between Washington, D.C., and New York City in 1969, the predecessor to Acela. During the 1980s, the U.S. Federal Railroad Administration explored the possibilities of high-speed rail in the United States. On December 18, 1991, five potential high speed rail corridors were authorized, including the Northeast Corridor.

In the early 1990s, Amtrak tested several different high-speed trains from Europe on the Northeast Corridor. An X 2000 train was leased from Sweden for test runs from October 1992 to January 1993, followed by revenue service between Washington, D.C., and New York City from February to May and August to September 1993. Siemens showed the ICE 1 train from Germany, organizing the ICE Train North America Tour which started to operate on the Northeast Corridor on July 3, 1993.

=== Building and development ===
With the testing of the trains from Europe complete, Amtrak was able to define a set of specifications for high-speed equipment and in October 1994, Amtrak requested bids from train manufacturers for a trainset that could reach 150 miles per hour (240 km/h). A consortium of Bombardier (75%) and GEC Alsthom (now Alstom) (25%) was selected in March 1996.

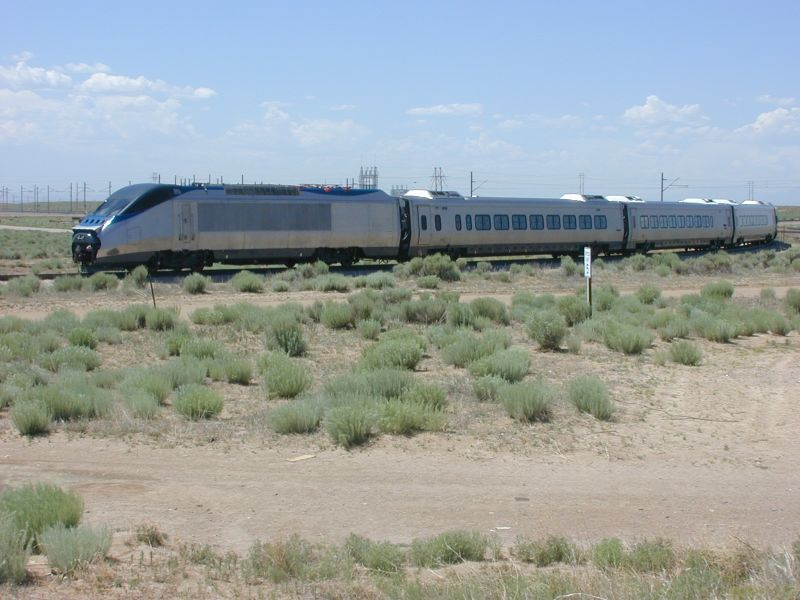
Acela Express trainset undergoing testing at TTC in 2000

In 1999, Amtrak unveiled its plan for the Acela Express, a high-speed train on the Northeast Corridor between Washington, D.C., and Boston. Several changes were made to the corridor to make it suitable for higher-speed electric trains. The Northend Electrification Project extended existing electrification from New Haven, Connecticut, to Boston to complete the overhead power supply along the 454-mile (731 km) route, and several grade crossings were improved or removed. Prior to 2000, all trains bound for Boston had to switch to diesel power at New Haven.

A pilot trainset was completed by early 2000 and sent to Transportation Technology Center (TTC) for testing in June 2000. An inaugural VIP run of the Acela occurred on November 16, 2000, followed by the first revenue run on December 11, 2000, a few months after the intended date.

=== Cost ===
Amtrak's original contract with the Bombardier-Alstom consortium was for the delivery of 20 trainsets (six coaches each, with power cars at front and rear) for $800 million. By 2004, Amtrak had settled contract disputes with the consortium, paying a total of $1.2 billion for the 20 trainsets plus 15 extra high-speed locomotives and the construction of maintenance facilities in Boston, New York, and Washington.

=== Impact of the Acela ===
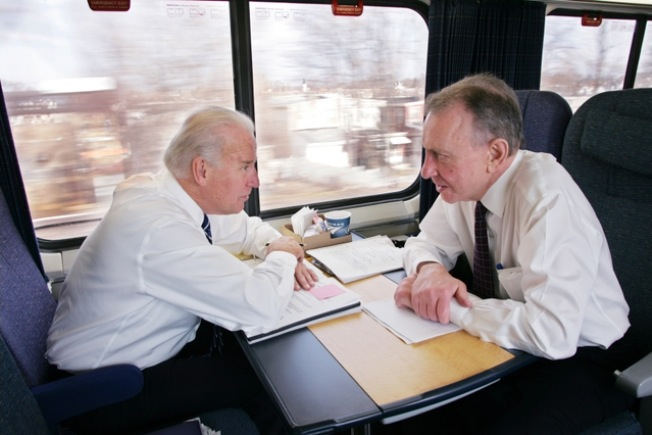
Vice President Joe Biden and Senator Arlen Specter riding the Acela Express to Philadelphia in February 2009

By 2005, Amtrak's share of the common-carrier market between New York and Boston had reached 40%, from 18% pre-Acela. With the increasing popularity of the faster, modern Acela Express, Metroliner service was phased out in late 2006. To meet the demand, more Acela services were added in September 2005. By August 2008 crowding had become noticeable.

By 2011, the Acela fleet had reached half of its designed service life. Amtrak proposed several replacement options, including one as part of its A Vision for High-Speed Rail in the Northeast Corridor. In 2011, Amtrak announced that forty new Acela coaches would be ordered in 2012 to increase capacity on existing trainsets. The existing trains would have received two more coaches, lengthening the trainsets from a 1-6-1 configuration to 1-8-1 (power car—passenger cars—power car). The longer trainsets would have required the modifications of the Acela maintenance facilities in Boston, New York and Washington. The first of the stretched trainsets was to have entered service in fiscal year 2014. This plan was cancelled in 2012 in favor of replacing, rather than refurbishing, the Acela fleet.

In January 2014, Amtrak issued a request for proposals on 28 or more new model Acela trainsets, in a combined order with the California High-Speed Rail Authority. After discussions with manufacturers, Amtrak and the California High Speed Rail Authority concluded their needs were too disparate for common rolling stock and decided not to pursue the joint option.

=== Fleet replacement ===
After the joint high-speed trainset procurement with California collapsed in 2014, Amtrak proceeded on its own. On August 26, 2016, then–Vice President Joe Biden announced a $2.45 billion federal loan to finance new equipment and Northeast Corridor upgrades, and Amtrak selected Alstom's Avelia Liberty design, marketed as the NextGen Acela, ordering 28 trainsets to replace the 20 first-generation sets. The larger fleet was intended to allow hourly New York–Boston service all day and half-hourly New York–Washington service at peak hours, with assembly taking place at Alstom's plants in Hornell and Rochester, New York.

Body construction began at Hornell in October 2017, when Alstom also unveiled the trainset's livery, and a prototype subsequently entered testing at the Transportation Technology Center in Pueblo, Colorado, and on the Northeast Corridor. The trainsets were initially expected to begin revenue service in 2021, with the entire fleet delivered the following year.

The program ultimately ran more than three years behind schedule. Amtrak and Alstom attributed much of the slippage to unforeseen difficulty completing the computer-simulation modeling required by the Federal Railroad Administration (FRA) and to compatibility problems between the European-derived design and the corridor's curve-heavy, century-old infrastructure. An October 2023 audit by the Amtrak Office of Inspector General found the program over budget and reported that each of the 12 trainsets built so far had defects—among them hydraulic leaks in the tilt system, corrosion caused by water pooling between cars, and five windows that had shattered spontaneously—and that Alstom had begun building trains before validating the crash-simulation model needed for FRA certification. With the new fleet delayed, the first-generation sets were kept running well beyond their planned retirement, and Amtrak began removing several from service to harvest parts.

On January 13, 2024, after the simulation model finally passed, the FRA cleared the Avelia Liberty for on-track testing between Washington and Boston. Qualification testing was completed and a spring 2025 launch was targeted; after that date passed, Amtrak revised its estimate to "coming soon". On August 7, 2025, Amtrak announced that the trains would debut on August 28, and the first five trainsets entered revenue service that day.

=== Legacy and influence ===
Since its introduction, the Acela has become a symbol of modern passenger rail in the United States and has influenced subsequent high-speed rail planning efforts across the country. The Train's operational success demonstrated consistent public demand for faster, business-oriented intercity travel, reinforcing federal and state interest in high-speed rail corridors such as California High-Speed Rail and Brightline West. Amtrak's experience with Acela's maintenance and ridership patterns has also informed the design of future services and infrastructure standards along the Northeast Corridor and beyond.

=== Branding ===
Before the introduction of the Acela, several classes of trains operated on the Northeast Corridor: the express Metroliners, the Philadelphia-New York Clockers, Empire Service trains between New York City and Niagara Falls via the Empire Corridor, Keystone Service trains between New York City and to Harrisburg via the Keystone Corridor, and the umbrella term NortheastDirect, applied to other trains on the corridor (in addition to unique names assigned to many departures).

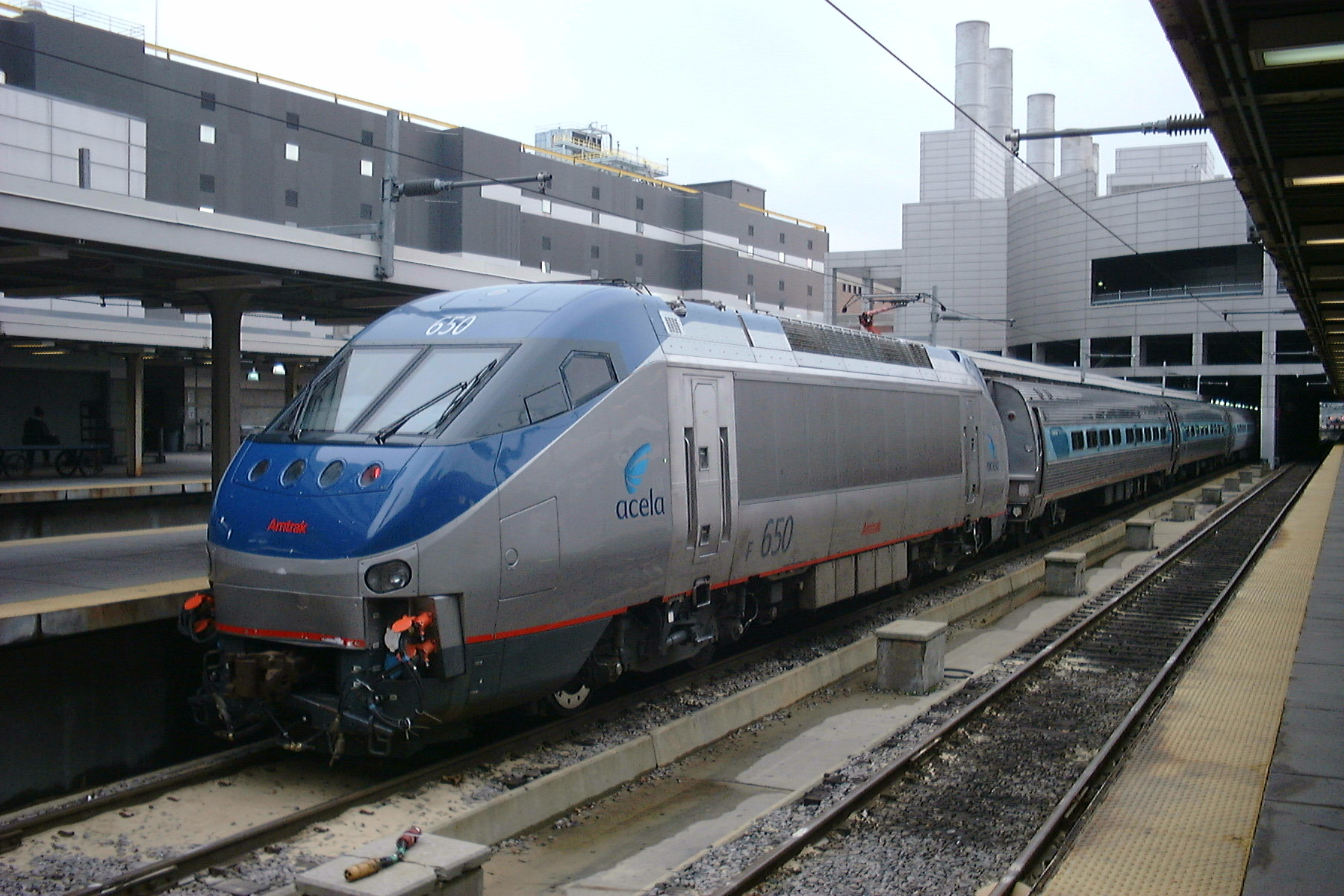
An Acela Regional train at South Station, Boston, in 2002

Amtrak announced the Acela name in March 1999 as a part of the original announcement of the service itself. The branding team based the name "Acela" on the concepts of "acceleration" and "excellence". At the same time, Amtrak launched what it called the Capstone Program, a short-lived plan to rebrand the NortheastDirect, Keystone Service and Empire Service trains as Acela Regional and the Clocker trains as Acela Commuter.

The Acela Regional name was first applied to NortheastDirect trains 130–133 in 2000. Those trains became the first electrified trains to run on the full Northeast Corridor between Washington, D.C. and Boston. As more trains were electrified, they too were rebranded.

Following widespread rider confusion in distinguishing the three services, Amtrak removed the branding from the lower-speed Acela Regional and Acela Commuter trains in 2003.

In 2019, Amtrak shortened the name of the service from Acela Express to simply Acela.

== Rolling stock ==
=== First-generation trainsets ===
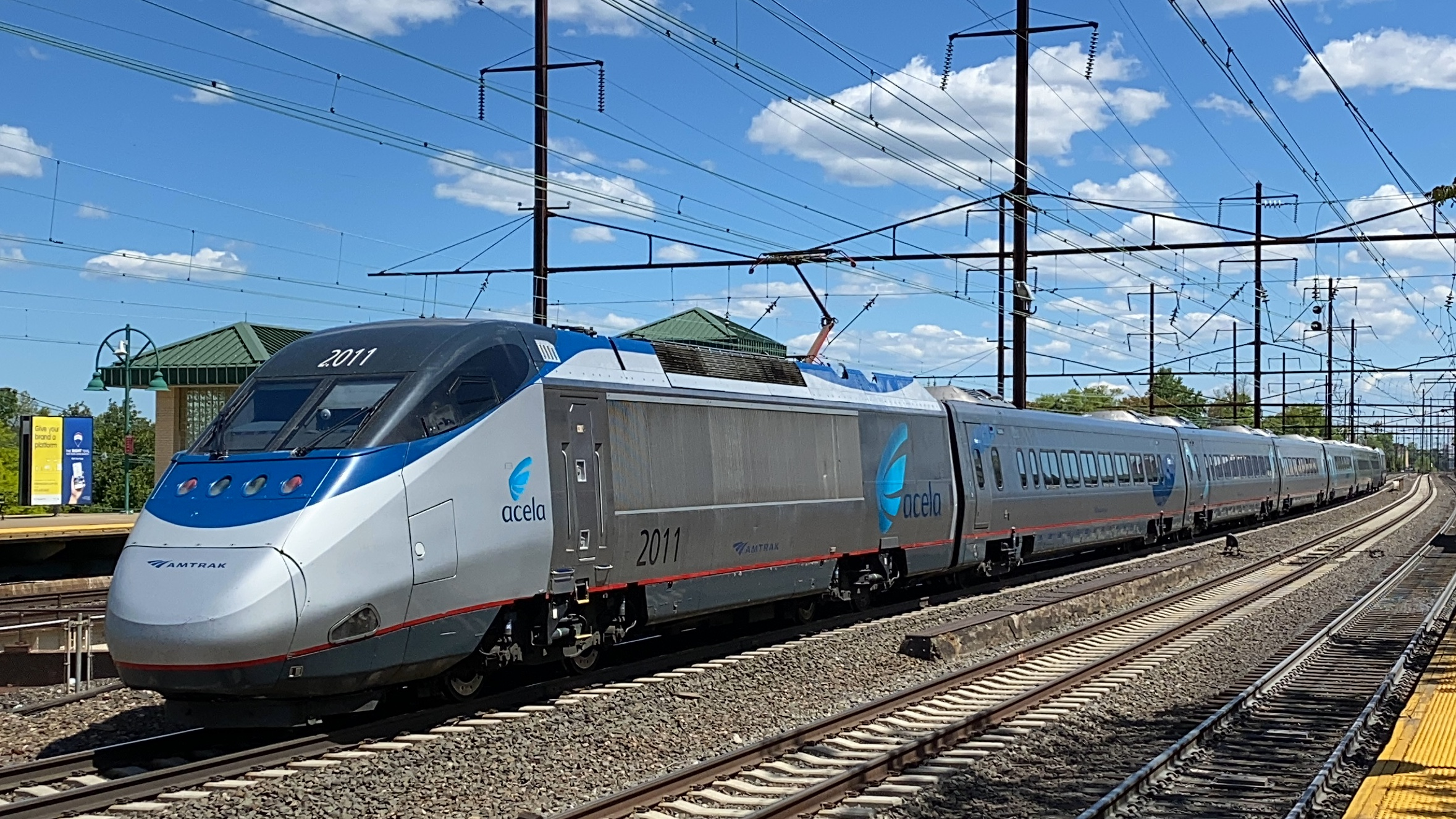
First-generation Acela Express trainset in New Jersey, May 2021

The first-generation Acela trainset is a unique set of vehicles designed specifically to satisfy governmental rolling stock requirements established primarily by the Federal Railroad Administration (FRA). This includes the ability to withstand a collision with a freight train at speed without collapsing. Most manufacturers that bid on the Acela were unable to meet the structural requirements, due to increased costs and complications for the manufacture of the trains, and the need for manufacturers to make significant engineering changes to their standard designs. In the end, only three qualified bidders remained: ABB (Swedish-Swiss manufacturer of the X 2000 train), Siemens (manufacturer of the German ICE), and a consortium of Bombardier (manufacturer of the LRC trains) and Alstom (manufacturer of the French TGV).

The design, using identical 6,200 horsepower (4,600 kW) power cars at each end which operate on voltages of 12 kV, 12.5 kV, and 25 kV AC, and either 25 or 60 Hz frequency, derives several components from the TGV, such as the third-generation TGV's traction system (including the four asynchronous AC motors per power car, rectifiers, inverters, and regenerative braking), the trucks/bogies structure (a long-wheelbase dual transom H frame welded steel with outboard mounted tapered roller bearings), the brake discs (although there are only three per axle, versus four on the TGV), and crash energy management techniques to control structural deformation in the event of an accident.

The tilting carriages are based upon Bombardier's earlier LRC trains used on Via Rail rather than the TGV's non-tilting articulated trailers. Acela power cars and passenger cars are much heavier than those of the TGV in order to meet the FRA's crash standards. French and Canadian crews testing the Acela referred to it as "the pig" due to its weight. The extra weight leads to the Acela's power-to-weight ratio being about 22.4 hp per tonne, compared to 30.8 hp for a SNCF TGV Reseau trainset. The Tier II crash standards, adopted in 1999, have also resulted in the passenger cars being designed without steps and trapdoors, which means that the trainsets can only serve lines with high-level platforms such as the Northeast Corridor. Acela trains are semi-permanently coupled (but not articulated as in the TGV) and are referred to as trainsets. Bombardier later used the Acela carriage design and a diesel/gas turbine variant of the power car for its experimental JetTrain.

=== Second-generation trainsets ===
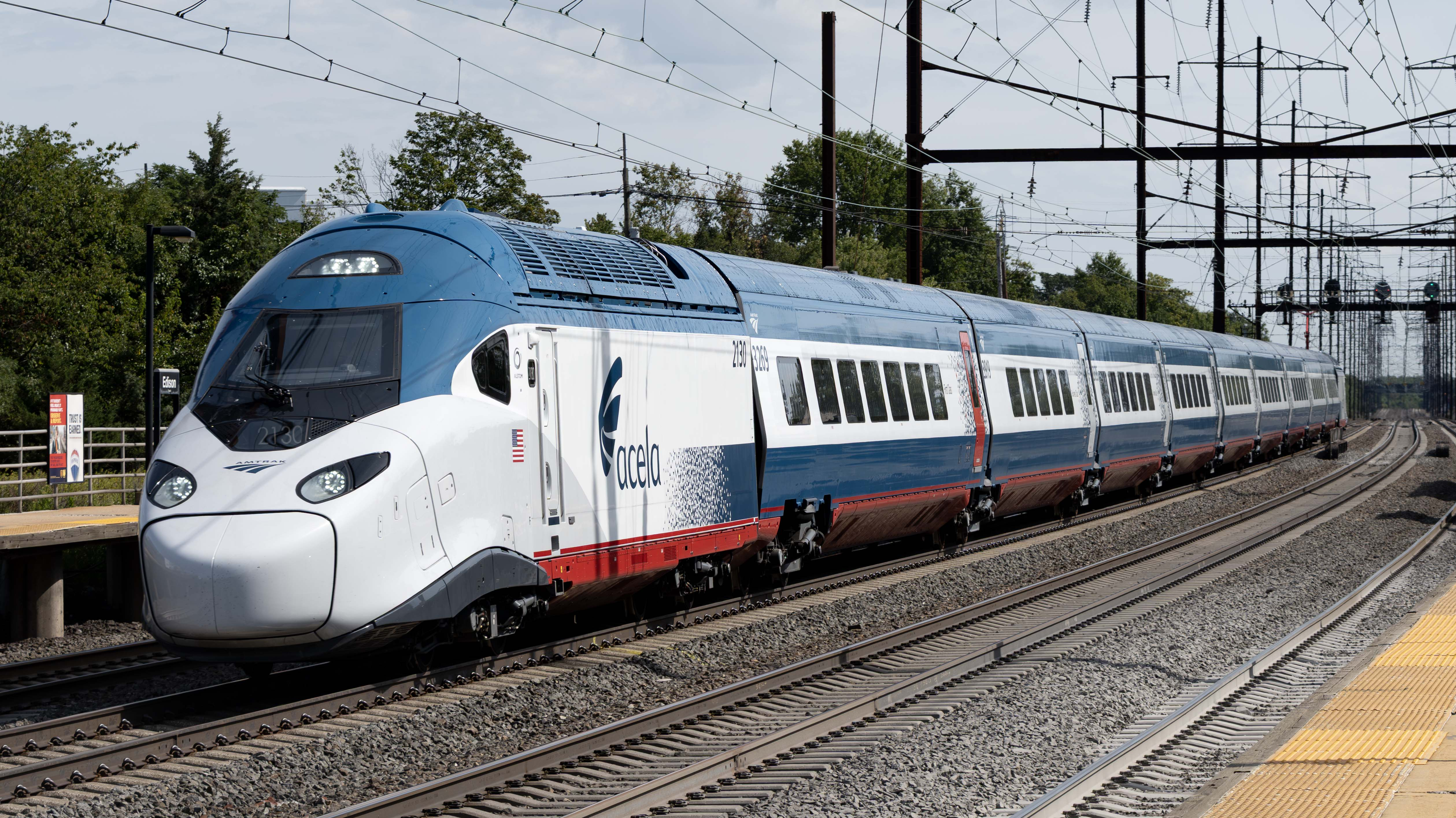
Second-generation Avelia Liberty trainset passes through Edison station in New Jersey on August 28, 2025, the first day of service

The second-generation Acela equipment is the Alstom Avelia Liberty, marketed by Amtrak as the NextGen Acela and part of the company's Avelia family of high-speed trains, developed specifically for the North American market. Its passenger cars derive from the AGV used in Italy, the concentrated power cars share their design with the Avelia Horizon developed for the French TGV network, and the tilt system is adapted from the Pendolino. As with the first generation, the design was adapted to satisfy FRA crashworthiness requirements, in this case through Alstom's crash-energy-management system rather than the heavier conventional structures used on the original Acela.

Each trainset is formed of two short-wheelbase power cars bracketing nine articulated passenger cars, with capacity to insert three additional cars if demand grows. Unlike the original Acela, whose cars ride on their own bogies and are only semi-permanently coupled, the Avelia Liberty is articulated: the wheel-and-axle frames sit beneath the gangways between adjacent cars, forming a single connected trainset. Placing the bogies between the cars and away from the seating areas reduces noise and vibration. Each set carries 386 passengers—378 seats plus eight wheelchair spaces—roughly 25% more than the 304-seat first-generation set.

The Avelia Liberty uses Alstom's Tiltronix anticipative tilt system, which leans the cars by up to 6.3°—compared with 4.2° on the first generation—to permit roughly 30% higher speeds through curves. The two power cars provide a combined output of about 7,000 kW (9,400 hp), and the trainsets are designed for 220 mph (350 km/h) with tilt disabled and 186 mph (299 km/h) in tilting service, though they are limited to 160 mph (260 km/h) by current Northeast Corridor track and signaling. Alstom describes the design as lighter and more energy-efficient than the equipment it replaces, recovering energy through regenerative braking.

=== Operating speeds ===
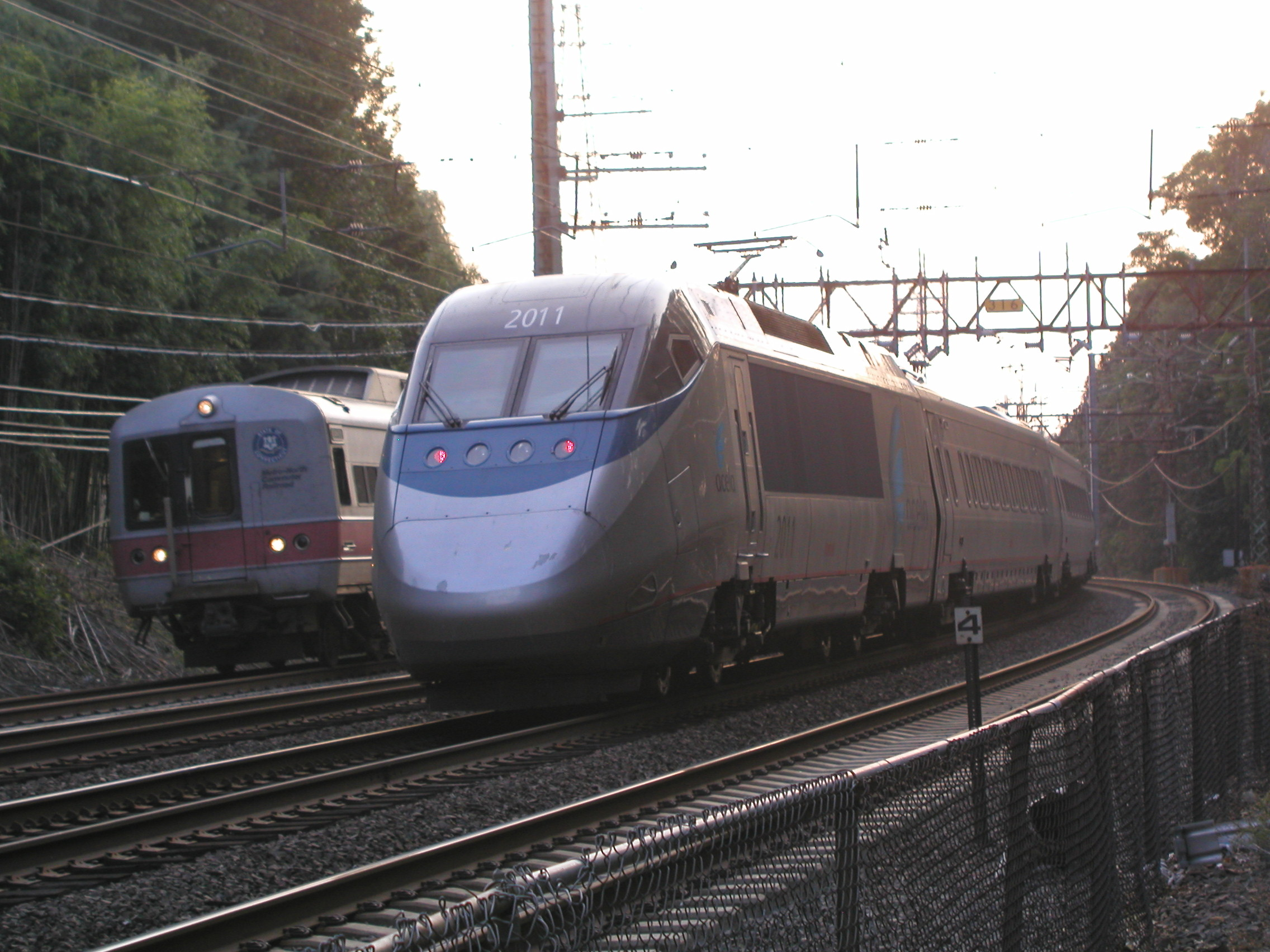
An Acela Express train passes a Metro-North New Haven Line train in southwestern Connecticut

Although the first-generation Acela Express trainsets were designed with a top speed of 165 mph (266 km/h) and the second-generation Avelia Liberty trainsets are designed to reach 220 mph (354 km/h), the existing infrastructure of the Northeast Corridor significantly limits speeds.

The maximum speed limit on the Northeast Corridor is 160 mph (260 km/h) on 40 miles (64 km) of the 457-mile (735 km) route, in four sections of track in Rhode Island, Massachusetts, and New Jersey. The Acela achieves an average speed (including stops) of 82 mph (132 km/h) between Washington and New York, and an average speed of 66 mph (106 km/h) from New York to Boston. The average speed over the entire route is 70.3 mph (113 km/h).

Speeds are limited by the route the corridor takes through urban areas, and there are several speed restrictions below 60–80 mph (97–129 km/h) over bridges or through tunnels that are over a century old. Altogether, Amtrak has identified 224 bridges along Acela's route that are beyond their design life.

South of the Delaware River, the Acela's top speed is 135 mph (217 km/h). One limiting factor is the overhead catenary support system which was constructed before 1935 and lacks the constant-tension features of the new catenary east of New Haven. The Pennsylvania Railroad ran Metroliner test trains in the late 1960s as fast as 164 mph (264 km/h) and briefly intended to run the Metroliner service at speeds reaching 150 mph (241 km/h). Certification testing for commercial operation at 160 mph (257 km/h) involving test runs at up to 165 mph (266 km/h) began between Trenton and New Brunswick in September 2012. Passenger operation at 150 mph (241 km/h) began in this region in late May 2022.

The fastest schedule between New York and Washington, DC, was 2 hours, 43 minutes in 2012. $450 million was allotted by President Barack Obama's administration to replace catenary and upgrade signals between Trenton and New Brunswick, which will allow speeds of 160 mph (257 km/h) over a 23 mi (37 km) stretch. The improvements were scheduled to be completed in 2016, but have been delayed; the project was partially completed in late May 2022, with the remainder projected in 2024. This section of track holds the record for the highest speed by a train in the US, which is 170.8 mph (274.9 km/h), achieved in a test run by the U.S./Canada-built UAC TurboTrain on December 20, 1967.

North of New York City, Amtrak upgraded the track along the Connecticut shoreline east of New Haven to allow maximum speeds in excess of 110 mph (177 km/h), in preparation for the Acela launch. Although this area contains the fastest current operating speeds (150 mph (241 km/h)), it also has the slowest section of the NEC: between New Rochelle, New York, and New Haven, Connecticut. This section is owned by Metro-North Railroad and the Connecticut Department of Transportation and is heavily used by commuter trains which limit the speed of the Acela. Amtrak's trains achieve 90 mph (145 km/h) only on a limited 4 mi (6.4 km) stretch in New York State and rarely exceed 60 mph (97 km/h) at any time eastbound through Connecticut until reaching New Haven. In 1992, ConnDOT began plans to upgrade the catenary system and replace outdated bridges on the New Haven Line to enable the Acela to run slightly faster. As of May 2017 the catenary replacement and bridge work were under way and expected to be completed by mid-2018.

On July 9, 2007, Amtrak introduced a limited-stop round trip, with trains stopping only at Philadelphia between New York and Washington. This shortened the trip between the two cities to 2 hours 35 minutes, making the trip roughly an hour faster than some of the Northeast Regional train services. These trains were an experiment to find ways to expedite travel time on the Acela; Amtrak has since dropped them.

=== High speed infrastructure ===
The dense population of the northeastern United States makes the Northeast Corridor the most heavily traveled portion of the American passenger rail system. Two-thirds of rail passengers in the United States live in or near New York City, also home to the nation's busiest passenger rail station, Penn Station. In order to compete with airliners, Amtrak needed to increase the speed of trains in the region. The former Shore Line from New Haven to Boston is burdened by sharp turns and grade crossings, the crossings being of special concern.

Tilting enables passengers to ride more comfortably on curved sections of track faster than would otherwise be possible, by leaning into the bend. Acela trainsets use active tilting above 60 mph (97 km/h) on most of the system, but some segments of track in the Northeast Corridor are too close together for the cars to safely tilt while maintaining FRA minimum space between trains on parallel tracks. Metro-North Railroad restricts tilting on the segment of track north of New York which it owns. The system was originally designed for a 6.8° tilt, but the cars were redesigned 4 in (102 mm) wider to accommodate wider seats and aisles that reduced allowable tilt to 4.2° to fit within the clearance constraints of the existing tracks. Traveling at higher than 135 mph (217 km/h) also requires constant-tension catenary, which is only implemented on the more modern catenary system north of New York City. South of New York City, the trains are restricted to 135 mph (217 km/h). By comparison, the Northeast Regional and the now-defunct Metroliner service reached 125 mph (201 km/h).

Acela service was originally expected to begin in late 1999 but was delayed. The catenary system could not support the intended speeds between Washington DC and New York City, but the newer system between New York City and Boston allows the higher speeds. Attention was drawn to the decreased 4.2° tilt, but this was not the root of the speed problem, as the tracks from New York to Boston are similar to those between New York and Washington, and the tilt mechanism is not the factor enabling higher speeds. Following repairs, the first Acela service began on December 11, 2000, a year behind schedule.

Acela travels between Boston and New York in about three and a half hours (an improvement of half an hour); New York to Washington runs take a minimum of two hours and forty-five minutes. These schedules, as well as the relative convenience of direct downtown-to-downtown rail service as opposed to air travel, especially after the September 11 attacks, have made the Acela Express more competitive with the air shuttles. Due to this competition, Southwest Airlines canceled service between Washington and New York.

==== Platform track speeds ====
Acela passing through a platform track at Kingston Station in Rhode Island at 150 mph.

Due to the high speed at which Acela trains bypass platforms of local stations, concerns have mounted in some communities over inadequate warnings and safeguards for passengers waiting for other trains, including that the two-foot wide yellow platform markings may not keep people at a safe distance. At Kingston station in Rhode Island and Mansfield station in Massachusetts, Acela trains pass by at 150 mph (241 km/h). Suggestions include platform safety barriers, or use of different announcements for approaching Acela trains versus slower ones.

=== Outages ===
In August 2002, shortly after their introduction, Acela trainsets were briefly removed from service when the brackets that connected truck (bogie) dampers (shocks) to the powerunit carbodies ("yaw dampers") were found to be cracking. The Acela returned to service when a program of frequent inspections was instituted. The damper brackets have since been redesigned and old brackets replaced by the newer design.

On April 15, 2005, the Acela was removed from service when cracks were found in the disc brakes of many passenger coaches. The Bombardier-Alstom consortium replaced the discs under warranty. Limited service resumed in July 2005, as a portion of the fleet operated with new brake discs. Metroliner trains, which the Acela Express was intended to replace, filled in during the outage. Amtrak announced on September 21, 2005, that all 20 trainsets had been returned to full operation.

In October 2012, Acela service was cancelled immediately before, during, and after Hurricane Sandy, which damaged the North River Tunnels causing lasting delays and reliability problems.

In March 2020, all Acela trips were suspended as part of a round of service reduction in response to the COVID-19 pandemic in the United States. Amtrak resumed Acela service on June 1, 2020.

== Service ==
=== Composition ===
The Acela Express trainset consists of two power cars, a Café car, a First Class car, and four Business Class cars, semi-permanently coupled together. It has fewer seats than its regional service counterparts. The First Class car has 44 seats, being three seats across (one on one side, two on the other side), four-seat tables and assigned seating. There are 260 Business Class seats on each trainset; these cars have four seats across (two on each side), four-seat tables, and assigned seating. Baggage may be stowed in overhead compartments or underneath seats. Trains are wheelchair-accessible. Each car has one or two toilets, with one being ADA compliant.

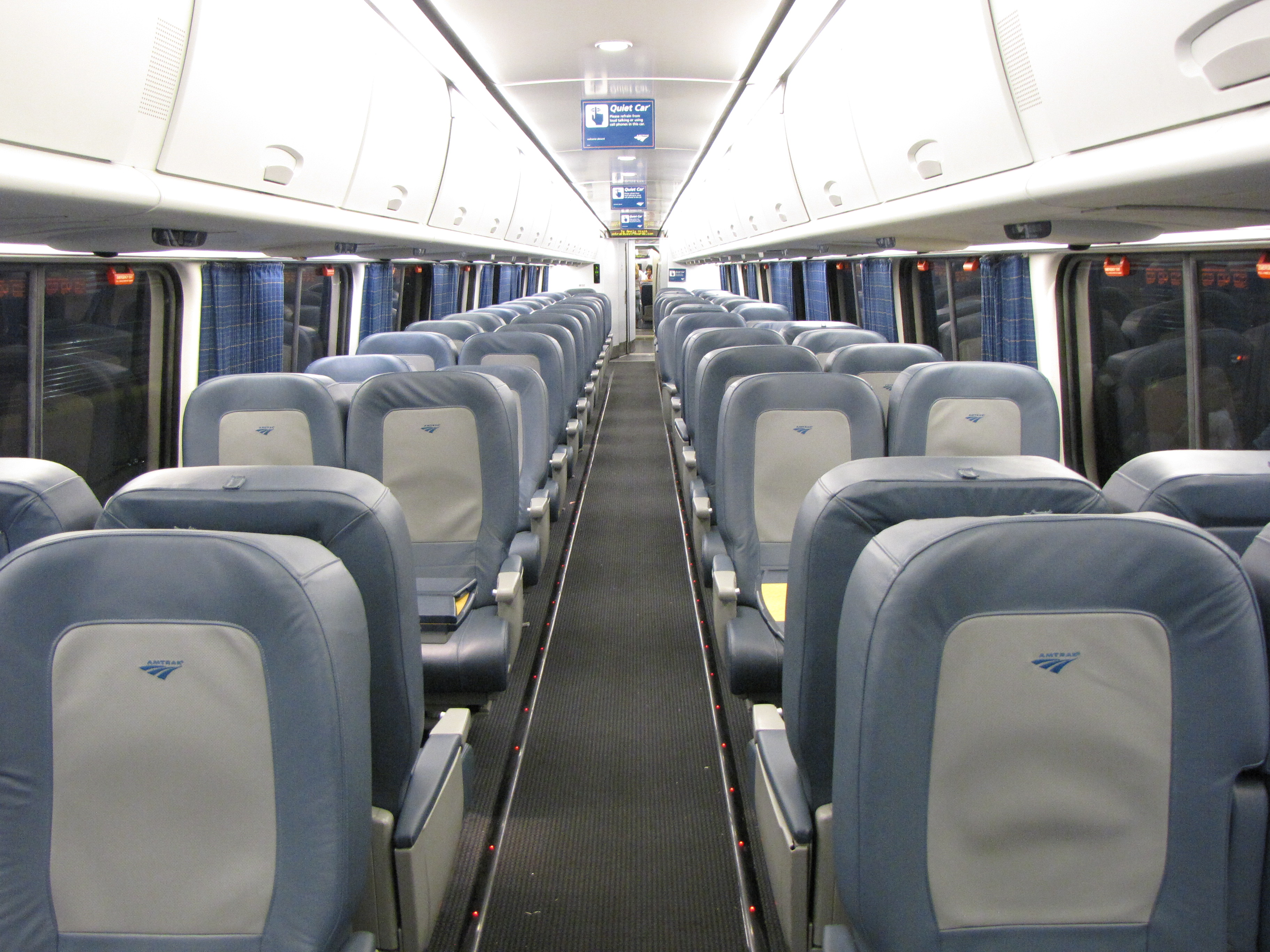
A Business Class car from an original Acela trainset

The Business Class car adjacent to First Class is designated as a quiet car, where passengers are asked to refrain from loud talking and phone conversations. Automatic sliding doors between cars reduce noise.

The original production sets are formed as follows:

Car no.		1	2	3	4	5	6		Total
Designation	Power	First Class	Business Class (quiet car)	Business Class	Café	Business Class		Power	
Weight Pounds (Metric ton)	204,000 (93)	142,000 (64)	139,000 (63)	139,000 (63)	139,000 (63)	139,000 (63)	142,000 (64)	204,000 (93)	1,246,000 (565)
Capacity	—	44	65	65	—	65	65	—	304

Compared to the original Acela trainsets, the NextGen Acela trainsets have 43 seats in First Class and 343 seats in Business Class, of which 8 of these seats are a wheelchair space. The quiet car has been moved to the opposite end of the train from the First Class car. The First Class galley has also been moved into the Business Class car adjacent to the First Class car, resulting in a 10-seat reduction in that car compared to the rest of the intermediate Business Class cars. Each car aside from the Café car is equipped with one ADA compliant toilet.

The NextGen Acela trainsets are formed as follows:

Car no.		1	2	3	4	5	6	7	8	9		Total
Designation	Power	First Class	Business Class				Café	Business Class		Business Class (quiet car)	Power	
Capacity	—	43	39	49	49	49	—	49	49	59	—	386

=== Operations and staffing ===
Acela offers two classes of seating, Business Class and First Class. Unlike most other Amtrak trains, Business Class is the de facto standard class on Acela trains; there is no coach service.

Acela maintenance is generally taken care of at the Ivy City facility in Washington, DC; Sunnyside Yard in Queens, New York; or Southampton Street Yard in Boston.

The Acela trainsets underwent minor refurbishments between mid-2009 and 2010 at Penn Coach Yard, next to 30th Street Station in Philadelphia, Pennsylvania. These refurbishments included new blue leather seats throughout the trainset.

In May 2018, Amtrak announced a 14-month program to refresh the interiors of the Acela trainsets, including new seat cushions and covers, new aisle carpeting, and a deep clean. This refurbishment program has been completed as of June 2019.

==== Wi-Fi service ====
Wireless Internet station service began in 2004. In 2010, with services provided by The GBS Group, all Acela trains began offering "AmtrakConnect" supporting IEEE 802.11a/b/g/n, 2.4 GHz and 5 GHz and standard VPN connections. In 2016, Amtrak upgraded to a faster wifi service.

==== Staffing ====
Generally, Amtrak train crews consist of an engineer, a conductor, and at least one assistant conductor. Acela trains also have an On-Board Service crew consisting of two First Class attendants and a Café Car attendant. In addition to the food service provided in the Café Car, on most trains an attendant will also provide at-seat cart service, serving refreshments throughout the train. First Class passengers are served meals at their seats on all services.

== Notable incidents ==
- During the Northeast blackout of 2003, a northbound Acela Express train was stuck on the Hell Gate Bridge for over nine hours, until a rescue engine from Sunnyside Yard was able to tow the train back to New York's Penn Station.
- The first Acela grade crossing accident occurred on September 27, 2005, when a car rolled under closed crossing gate arms in Waterford, Connecticut, and was struck by a train traveling at 70 miles per hour (110 km/h), killing three automobile passengers. None of the 130 Acela passengers were injured. The gates were found to have been functioning properly, but the incident drew much criticism regarding the eleven remaining grade crossings along Amtrak's busy Northeast Corridor.
- On March 24, 2017, an Acela Express train derailed at low speed in New York's Penn Station, during morning rush hour. All 248 passengers were safely evacuated. The derailment was caused by a defective section of track, of which Amtrak was aware, but had not yet fixed.
- On February 6, 2018, Acela Express train No. 2150 split apart between the first and second cars in the trainset, at 124 mph (200 km/h), near Havre de Grace, Maryland. There were no injuries of the crew nor the 52 passengers on board, who were transferred to Northeast Regional train No. 180.

== Station stops ==
State	Town/City	Station	Connections
Massachusetts	Boston	South Station	Amtrak: Lake Shore Limited, Northeast Regional; MBTA Commuter Rail: Fairmount Line, Framingham/Worcester Line, Fall River/New Bedford Line, Franklin/Foxboro Line, Greenbush Line, Kingston Line, Needham Line, Providence/Stoughton Line; MBTA subway: Red Line, Silver Line; MBTA bus Intercity bus services at South Station Bus Terminal
Massachusetts	Boston	Back Bay	Amtrak: Northeast Regional, Lake Shore Limited; MBTA Commuter Rail: Framingham/Worcester Line, Franklin/Foxboro Line, Needham Line, Providence/Stoughton Line; MBTA subway: Orange Line; MBTA bus
Massachusetts	Westwood	Route 128	Amtrak: Northeast Regional; MBTA Commuter Rail: Providence/Stoughton Line
Rhode Island	Providence	Providence	Amtrak: Northeast Regional; MBTA Commuter Rail: Providence/Stoughton Line; Rhode Island Public Transit Authority; Amtrak Thruway
Connecticut	New Haven	Union Station	Amtrak: Hartford Line, Northeast Regional, Vermonter; CTrail: Hartford Line, Shore Line East; Metro-North: ■ New Haven Line; CTtransit New Haven; Intercity bus: FlixBus, Greyhound, Peter Pan
Connecticut	Stamford	Stamford	Amtrak: Northeast Regional, Vermonter; Metro-North: ■ New Haven Line; CTtransit Stamford; Intercity bus: Greyhound
New York	New York	New York; Penn Station	Amtrak (long-distance): Cardinal, Crescent, Lake Shore Limited, Palmetto, Silver Meteor; Amtrak (intercity): Adirondack, Berkshire Flyer, Carolinian, Empire Service, Ethan Allen Express, Keystone Service, Maple Leaf, Northeast Regional, Pennsylvanian, Vermonter; Long Island Rail Road: ■ City Terminal Zone, ■ Port Washington Branch; NJ Transit: ■ North Jersey Coast Line, ■ Northeast Corridor Line, ■ Gladstone Branch, ■ Montclair–Boonton Line, ■ Morristown Line, ■ Raritan Valley Line; NYC Subway: MTA Bus; Intercity bus: FlixBus, Tripper Bus, Vamoose Bus
New Jersey	Newark	Newark; Penn Station	Amtrak: Cardinal, Carolinian, Crescent, Keystone Service, Palmetto, Pennsylvanian, Silver Meteor, Vermonter; Newark Light Rail; NJ Transit: ■ North Jersey Coast Line, ■ Northeast Corridor Line, ■ Raritan Valley Line; PATH: NWK-WTC; NJ Transit; Intercity bus: FlixBus, Greyhound, Coach USA, Fullington Trailways
New Jersey	Iselin	Metropark	Amtrak: Crescent, Keystone Service, Northeast Regional, Palmetto, Vermonter; NJ Transit: ■ Northeast Corridor Line; Local bus: NJ Transit
Pennsylvania	Philadelphia	30th Street; Station	Amtrak: Cardinal, Carolinian, Crescent, Keystone Service, Northeast Regional, Palmetto, Pennsylvanian, Silver Meteor, Vermonter; SEPTA Regional Rail: all routes NJ Transit: ■ Atlantic City Line; SEPTA Metro: SEPTA City Bus, SEPTA Suburban Bus, NJ Transit; Intercity bus: Martz Trailways
Delaware	Wilmington	Wilmington	Amtrak: Cardinal, Carolinian, Crescent, Northeast Regional, Palmetto, Silver Meteor, Vermonter; SEPTA Regional Rail: ■ Wilmington/Newark Line; DART First State; Intercity bus: Greyhound
Maryland	Baltimore	Baltimore; Penn Station	Amtrak: Cardinal, Carolinian, Crescent, Northeast Regional, Palmetto, Pennsylvanian, Silver Meteor, Vermonter; MARC: ■ Penn Line; Light RailLink; MTA Maryland, Charm City Circulator
Maryland	Baltimore	BWI Airport	Amtrak: Crescent, Northeast Regional, Palmetto, Vermonter; MARC: ■ Penn Line; Shuttle to Baltimore/Washington International Airport; MTA Maryland, UMBC Transit
District of Columbia	Washington	Washington; Union Station	Amtrak: Cardinal, Carolinian, Crescent, Floridian, Northeast Regional, Palmetto, Silver Meteor, Vermonter, Amtrak Thruway; MARC: ■ Brunswick Line, ■ Camden Line, ■ Penn Line; Virginia Railway Express: ■ Manassas Line, ■ Fredericksburg Line; Metro: Red Line; Metrobus, MTA Maryland, Loudoun County Transit, PRTC; Intercity bus: FlixBus, Greyhound, BestBus, Peter Pan, OurBus

A limited number of Acela trains previously stopped at New Rochelle, New York; New London, Connecticut; and Trenton, New Jersey; service was eliminated in 2021, 2022 and 2023, respectively.

== See also ==
- List of high-speed trains
- List of Amtrak routes
