= Clocker (train) =

Former passenger train service

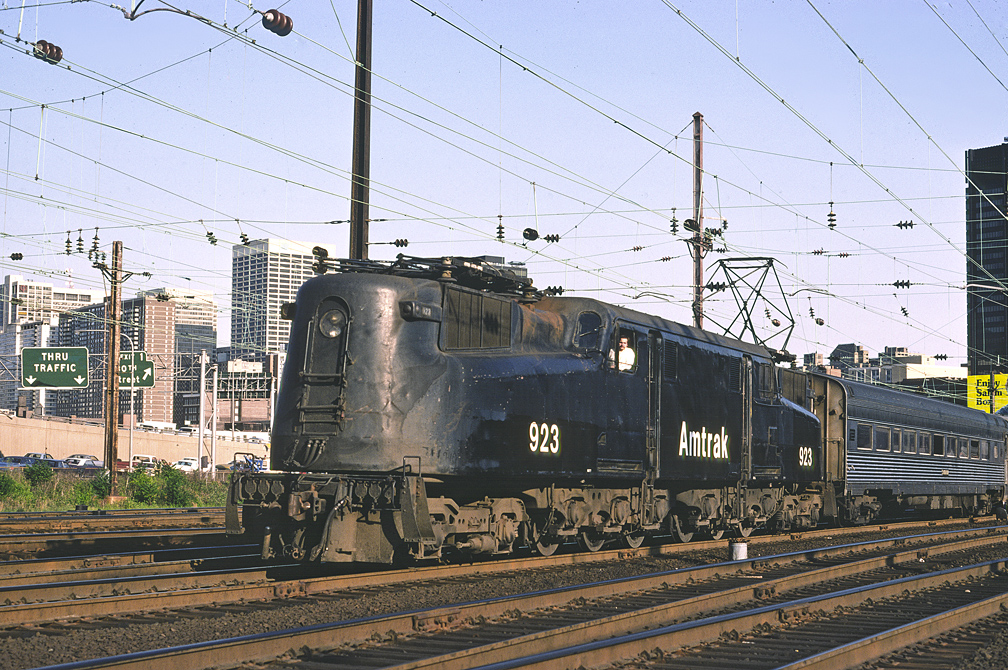
- A GG1 pulling a Clocker departing Philadelphia in 1976

Overview
- Service type: Inter-city rail
- Status: Discontinued
- Locale: Northeast Corridor
- First service: 1910s
- Last service: October 28, 2005
- Successor: NJ Transit
- Former operator(s): Pennsylvania Railroad, Amtrak

Route
- Termini: Philadelphia; New York
- Distance travelled: 91 miles (146 km)
- Average journey time: 95–110 minutes
- Service frequency: Multiple weekday round-trips

On-board services
- Class(es): Unreserved coach

Technical
- Rolling stock: Amfleet coaches
- Track gauge: 4 ft 8 1/2 in (1,435 mm)
- Electrification: Overhead catenary
- Track owner(s): Amtrak

The Clocker was a passenger train service between Philadelphia and New York City on the Northeast Corridor at first by the Pennsylvania Railroad and later by Amtrak. The service was nicknamed the Clocker by riders as trains were scheduled to leave each terminal at the top of the hour. The name was eventually adopted into official use by Amtrak in 1981. The service was briefly renamed Acela Commuter in 1999 before the name reverted to Clocker in 2003.

Amtrak discontinued the service on October 28, 2005, and it was partially replaced by additional NJ Transit express trains between Trenton, New Jersey, and New York City at times approximating the Clocker schedule.

== History ==
=== Pennsylvania Railroad ===
The Clocker was originally a Pennsylvania Railroad express train service between New York and Broad Street Station in Philadelphia; the name was unofficial, and PRR timetables did not use it. Soon after New York Penn Station opened in 1910, the express trains began departing New York and Philadelphia on the hour through the day, giving rise to the Clocker name (which the railroad itself seems never to have used). Until the electrification of the Northeast Corridor in 1933, most Clockers were scheduled to both leave and arrive on each hour, but faster schedules after electrification eliminated the on the hour arrival.

Pennsylvania Railroad cut back on the schedule, and by the time Amtrak took over the nation's passenger rail service on May 1, 1971, the Clocker service no longer ran hourly.

=== Amtrak ===
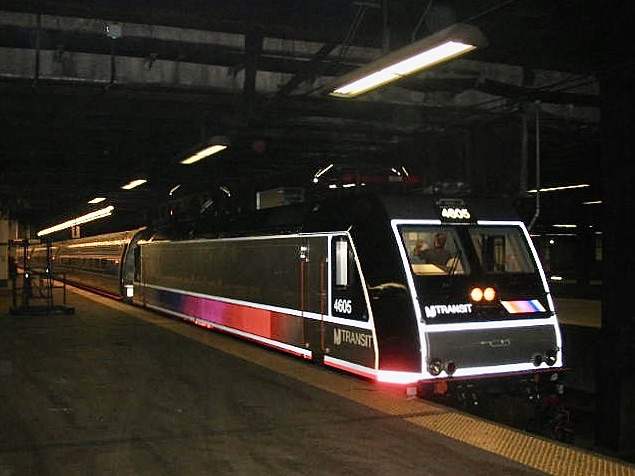
An Amtrak Clocker train pulled by a NJ Transit locomotive at Philadelphia's 30th Street Station in 2003

At the launch of Amtrak, the railroad assigned each run an individual name (listed in the table below). Starting with the October 1981 timetable, Amtrak officially adopted the Clocker name for the service. The trains were unreserved, coach class only, and Amtrak targeted the Clocker service at commuters travelling to local stops bypassed by the high-speed Metroliner trains, the Regional trains, and other named long-distance trains.

During the 1990s, NJ Transit started contracting with Amtrak to accept their monthly passes on the Clocker trains. These two decisions drastically shifted the clientele on the trains. Monthly ticket holders from New Jersey preferred the Clocker trains over the NJ Transit trains because they were faster and more comfortable, meanwhile, Amtrak's passengers avoided the Clocker trains because they were slower and frequently crowded. Also, the monthlies meant that few passengers traveled to or from Philadelphia.

Until 2002, the 7:59 AM Clocker from Princeton Junction included a private club car known as Club 200 that members paid up to $1,200 per year to join (equivalent to $2,098 in 2024). This was the last private club car used in regular commuter service on the Northeast Corridor.

When the Acela Express was introduced in 1999, Amtrak launched what it called the Capstone Program, a short-lived plan to re-brand the NortheastDirect, Keystone Service and Empire Service trains as Acela Regional and the Clocker trains as Acela Commuter. Following mass rider confusion between this service and the high-speed Acela Express service, the name reverted to Clocker in 2003.

By the early 2000s, NJ Transit was paying $6 million per year to compensate Amtrak for monthly ticket holders riding Clocker trains, and was loaning Amtrak its new ALP-46 locomotives to haul the trains' Amfleet coaches.

On October 28, 2005, Amtrak discontinued the Clocker service altogether and sold the Northeast Corridor operating slots to NJ Transit which used them to partially replace the service with additional Northeast Corridor Line express trains between Trenton and New York City at times approximating the Clocker schedule.

== Naming ==
| Name | Number | Notes |
New York-Philadelphia
| Philadelphian | 237 | |
| Betsy Ross | 211 | Sunday-only service ran Springfield-Washington |
| Keystone | 219 | Also the name of a Keystone Service train 1980–1981; see Valley Forge |
| Garden State | 221 | |
| William Penn | 223 | |
| Quaker City | 225 | |
| Rittenhouse | 227, 241 | |
| Schuylkill | 229 | Discontinued April 26, 1980 |
Philadelphia-New York
| Manhattan Limited | 252 | |
| Gotham | 254 | |
| Edison | 200 | |
| New Yorker | 202 | |
| Big Apple | 204 | Also the name of a Keystone Service train 1980–1994; see Valley Forge |
| Central Park | 210 | Discontinued April 26, 1980 |
| Murray Hill | 220 | |
| Herald Square | 222 | |
