= Metroliner (train) =

Former express train between Washington, D.C., and New York City

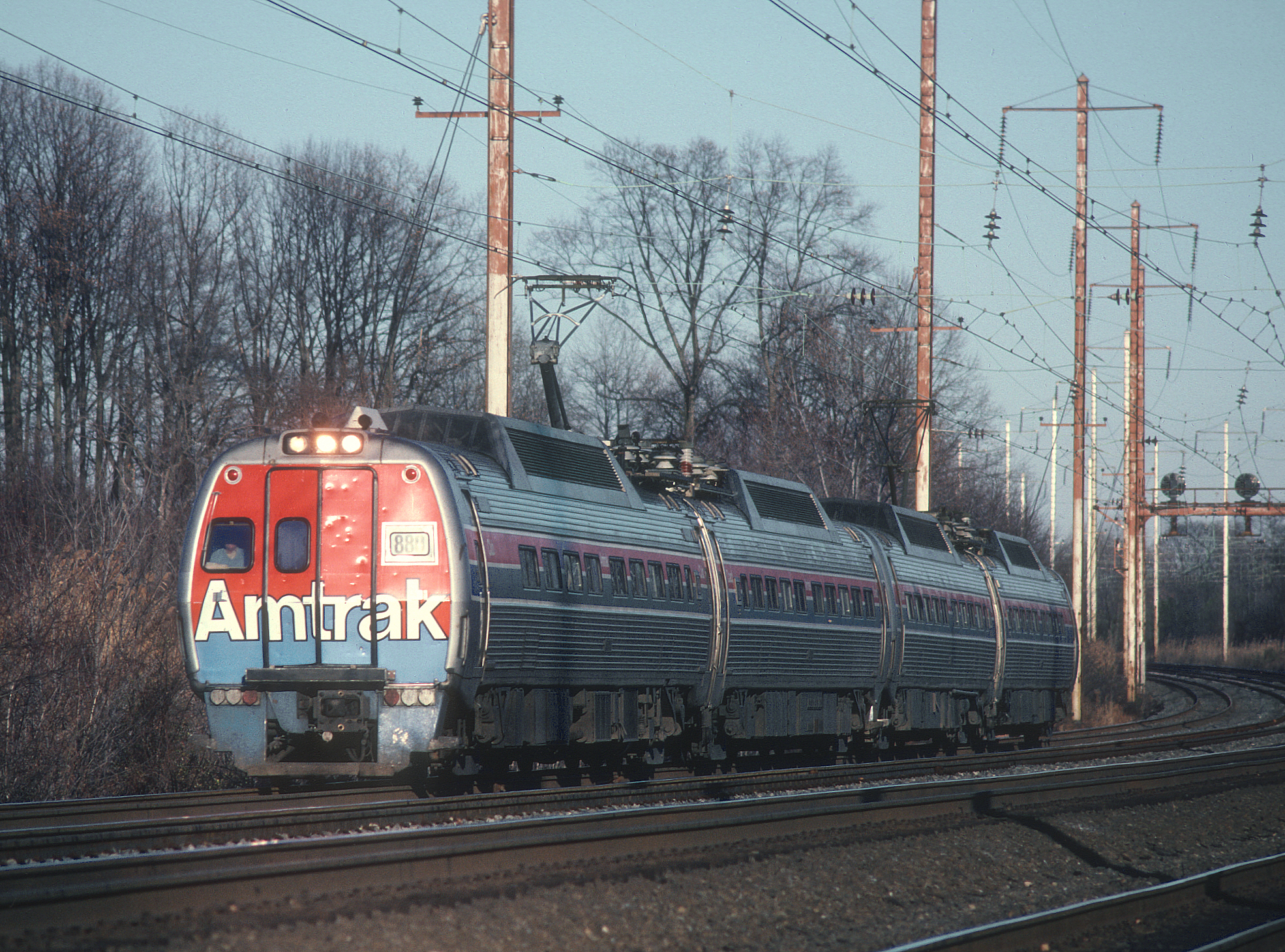
- A southbound Metroliner at Bowie, Maryland in 1980

Overview
- Service type: High speed Inter-city rail
- Status: Discontinued
- Locale: Northeast Corridor
- First service: January 16, 1969
- Last service: October 27, 2006
- Successor: Acela Express
- Former operator(s): Penn Central (1969–1971); Amtrak (1971–2006)

Route
- Termini: New York City; Washington, D.C.
- Distance travelled: 225 miles (362 km)
- Average journey time: 2.5 to 4 hours
- Service frequency: Up to 15 daily round trips

On-board services
- Class(es): Business and First

Technical
- Rolling stock: Budd Metroliners (1969–1982); EMD AEM-7s pulling Amfleet coaches (1978–2006)
- Track gauge: 4 ft 8 1/2 in (1,435 mm) standard gauge
- Electrification: Catenary; 11–13.5 kV 25 Hz AC; 11–13.5 kV 60 Hz AC
- Operating speed: Up to 125 mph (200 km/h)
- Track owner(s): PC, Amtrak

The Metroliners were extra-fare high-speed trains between Washington, D.C., and New York City which operated from 1969 to 2006. They were briefly first operated by Penn Central Transportation (successor to the Pennsylvania Railroad, which originally ordered the equipment), then by Amtrak for 35 years.

Service originally ran with Budd Metroliners, self-powered electric multiple unit cars designed for high-speed service. These proved unreliable and were replaced with locomotive-hauled trains in the 1980s. The trains had reserved business-class and first-class seating. The fastest trips between New York Penn Station and Washington Union Station were scheduled for 2.5 hours, though some midday trains around 1980 had schedules as long as 4 hours.

Amtrak replaced Metroliner service with the high-speed Acela Express, which runs up to 150 mph (240 km/h) in revenue service. The first Acela Express trains ran in 2000, but due to equipment difficulties at the time they did not fully replace the Metroliners until 2006.

== History ==
=== Beginning of service ===
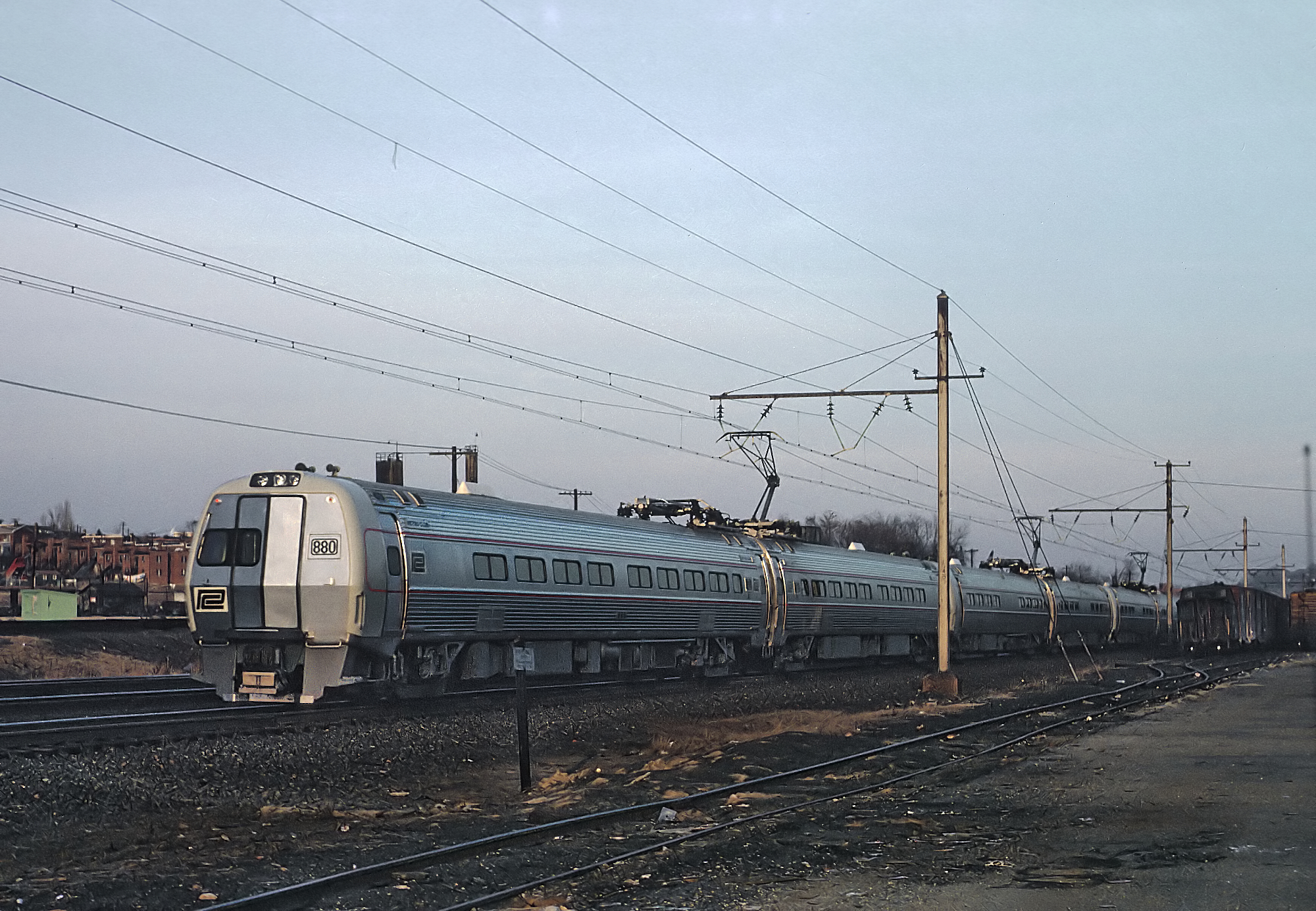
Budd Metroliner No. 880 of Penn Central on the inaugural run of the Metroliner service on January 16, 1969

The High Speed Ground Transportation Act of 1965 started a U.S. Government effort to develop a high speed train for Northeast Corridor service. The U.S. Department of Transportation worked with the Pennsylvania Railroad, Budd Company, General Electric and Westinghouse to develop an electric multiple unit high speed passenger train. An initial order of 50 Budd Metroliner cars was placed on May 6, 1966, with a target service date of October 1967. Service was to operate at 110 mph (180 km/h) with later increases to 150 mph (240 km/h), with hourly New York – Washington service and half-hourly New York – Philadelphia service. The Johnson Administration saw the new service as political capital and pushed for an aggressive schedule.

The new cars were primarily intended for high-level platforms for faster boarding; the PRR constructed high-level island platforms at Wilmington, Baltimore, and Washington, D.C. in 1967 and 1968. On June 13, 1967, the PRR announced plans for a suburban New Jersey station directly off the Garden State Parkway. The same month, the PRR decided on the "Metroliner" name for the vehicles and service, and announced that the trains would have higher fares than conventional service.

The first cars were delivered in September 1967, but soon proved to have numerous electric issues. Start of service was delayed to January 1968, then postponed indefinitely in March 1968. The PRR folded into Penn Central on February 1, 1968. SEPTA refused its 11 Metroliners, intended for Philadelphia-Harrisburg service, in August; Penn Central eventually leased them, increasing its fleet to 61. In October 1968, testing proved that the cars could operate the desired sub-3-hour trip time, and substation modifications by Westinghouse increased electrical reliability. Penn Central and Budd reached a settlement on their legal fight in November; on December 20, Penn Central announced that service would begin on January 16, 1969.

A Washington-New York round trip for VIPs was operated on January 15, 1969. Metroliner service finally started on January 16, 1969, with a single daily round trip leaving New York in the morning and Washington in the afternoon. A second round trip on a corresponding reversed schedule was added on February 10. A non-stop round trip on a 2.5 hour schedule was added on April 2, 1969. However, problems with the cars persisted; maximum speeds temporarily dropped from 120 mph (190 km/h) to 110 mph (180 km/h) soon after.

Despite difficulties, the service proved overwhelmingly popular and fairly reliable, with 90% on-time performance by May 1. Penn Central added a computerized ticketing system in August 1969, and doubled service to six daily round trips on October 27. On March 16, 1970, Capital Beltway station opened to serve the Metroliners, and all trips were scheduled for under three hours. A seventh round trip was added that August. Beginning on February 1, 1971, a cross-platform transfer to Turboliner service to Boston was offered at Penn Station. However, top speed was soon reduced again to 100 mph (160 km/h), making the Metroliners scarcely faster than conventional trains.

=== Amtrak era ===
Amtrak took over intercity passenger service from private operators on May 1, 1971. Although many trains were discontinued with the takeover, Metroliner service increased to 9 round trips. Schedules further increased to 12 round trips on an hourly schedule on November 14, 1971; one trip was extended to New Haven, Connecticut (then the northern limit of electrification). Two more round trips were added on May 1, 1972, and the all-time maximum of 15 round trips was reached on October 28, 1973.

=== Change of equipment ===
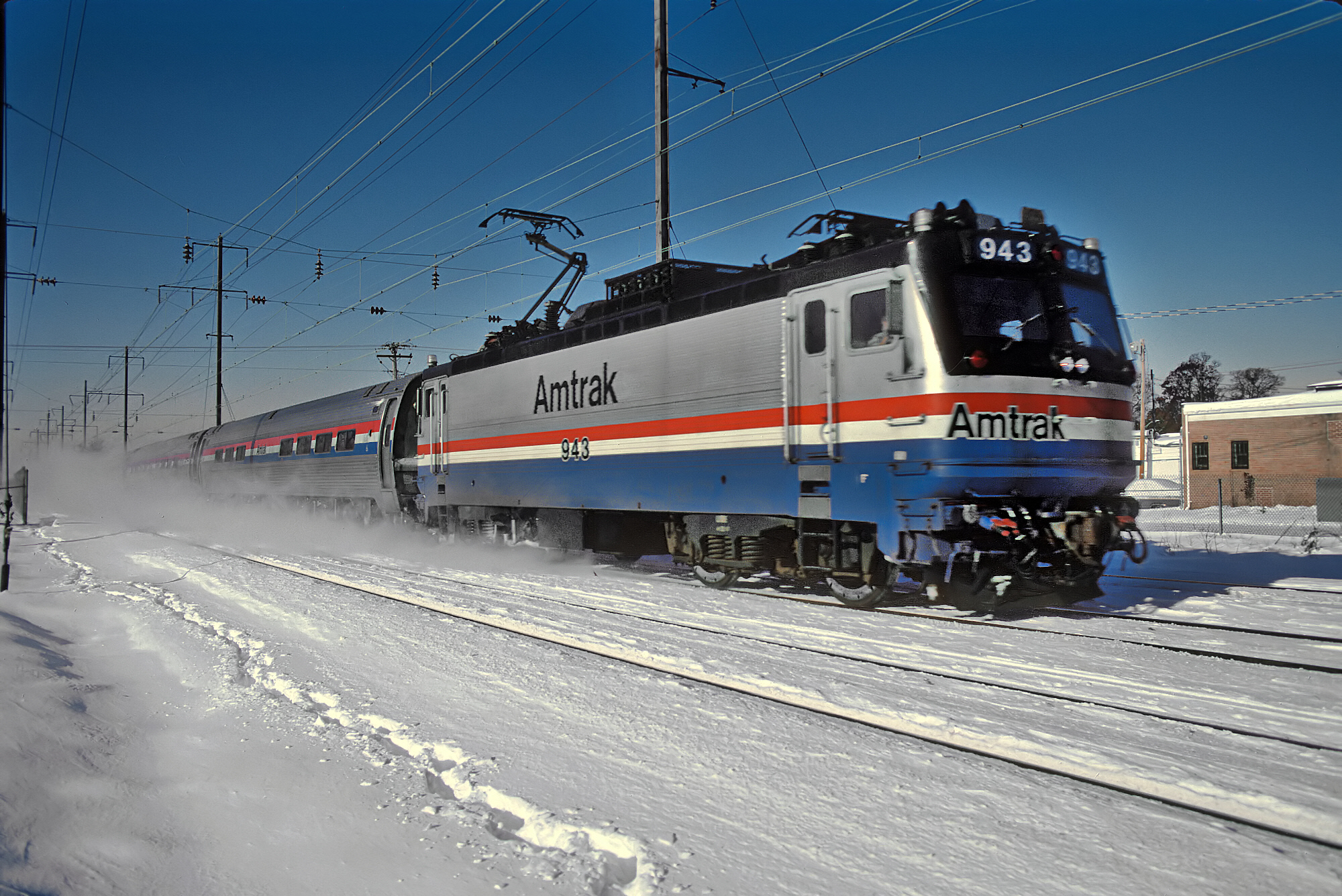
An AEM-7 hauls a Metroliner in 1987

Although initially promising, the Budd Metroliners proved unreliable; by January 1978, GG1 and E60 locomotives hauling conventional Amfleet coaches (whose design was based on the Metroliner) had better on-time percentages than Metroliners. In March 1978, Amtrak began sending the cars to General Electric for rebuilding. A GG1/Amfleet set covered one Metroliner round trip on a slower schedule.

In 1982, Amtrak finished replacing the Budd Metroliner cars, which had developed problems with their motors limiting their speed, with trains powered by the Swedish-developed AEM-7 locomotives pulling Amfleet coaches. Maximum speed of locomotive-hauled Metroliners increased to 120 mph (190 km/h) in 1982 and 125 mph (200 km/h) in 1985. In the six months following October 29, 1990, the morning nonstop express trains were scheduled to cover the distance between Washington and New York in two hours and thirty minutes, an average speed from start to arrival of better than 90 miles per hour.

=== Discontinuance ===
Amtrak expanded Metroliner service when problems developed with Acela Express braking systems during 2002 and 2005. As trainsets were repaired, the number of Metroliner trains declined to one round trip each weekday, which was finally discontinued on October 27, 2006. The current Northeast Regional service matches the top speed of Metroliner service, but makes more stops and does not offer first class seating. Prior to the COVID-19 pandemic, Amtrak ran one non-stop Acela train each way on weekdays with a travel time of 2 hours and 33 (or 35 southbound) minutes, comparable to the Metroliner service. As of 2023, those trains have not been restored and the fastest travel time is now 2 hours 45 minutes with stops in Baltimore, Wilmington, Philadelphia, and Newark.

=== Other Metroliner services ===
Amtrak operated several other short-lived services under the Metroliner brand.

On October 31, 1982, Amtrak added two New England Metroliner round trips between New York City and Boston, which ran with diesel locomotives north of New Haven. These were discontinued on April 28, 1984.

The next day, an additional round trip was added to the Los Angeles – San Diego corridor, supplementing the San Diegan. Branded as Metroliner, it made only two intermediate stops, cutting 15 minutes from the normal San Diegan schedule. The trip was discontinued on April 28, 1985.

On October 29, 1989, Amtrak introduced a single one-way morning Metroliner trip from Downingtown, Pennsylvania, to Washington. The trip largely served Amtrak employees, as a corresponding evening trip to serve regular commuters was not offered. The Downingtown trip was discontinued on October 25, 1991.

== See also ==
- Media related to Metroliner (train) at Wikimedia Commons
