= Northern New England Corridor =

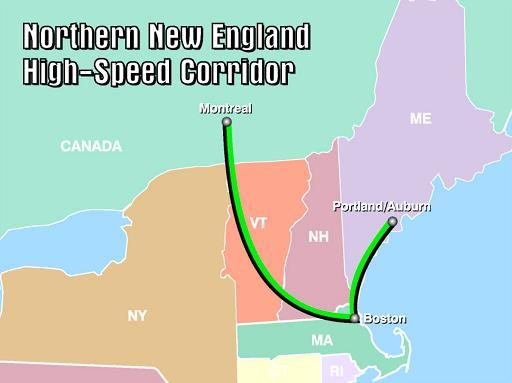
Corridor as designated by the Federal Railroad Administration

The Northern New England Corridor is one of ten federally designated higher-speed rail corridors in the United States. The proposed 489-mile (787 km) corridor would have allowed passenger trains to travel from Boston, Massachusetts, to Montreal, Quebec, Canada, in about 4 1/2 hours.

In 2004, Congress extended the Northern New England High Speed Rail Corridor from Boston to Springfield, Massachusetts, and Albany, New York, and from Springfield to New Haven, Connecticut. The Boston-Springfield-Albany route would provide a link to the Empire Corridor.

== Background ==
As of 2025, there is no direct passenger rail service between Boston and Montreal. Service from Boston to Portland takes about 2 hours 30 minutes via the Downeaster. There are no trains to Auburn. Service from Boston to Albany via Springfield takes just over 5 hours on the daily Lake Shore Limited. The New Haven–Springfield Line already allows speeds of up to 110 miles per hour (180 km/h), with end-to-end service taking about 1 hour 20 minutes.

== See also ==
- High-speed rail in the United States
- High-speed rail in Canada
- North–South Rail Link
