= National Maglev Initiative =

The National Maglev Initiative (NMI) was a research program undertaken in the early 1990s by the United States Department of Transportation, U.S. Army Corps of Engineers, Department of Energy, and other agencies which studied magnetically levitated, or "maglev", train technology, operating at speeds around 300 miles per hour (480 km/h). The effort was created in April 1990 and released a report in 1993. The Intermodal Surface Transportation Efficiency Act of 1991 (ISTEA) authorized $725 million in funds for maglev research, pending the results of the NMI study, but an appropriation of funds was also required, and it's not clear if that ever occurred.

The initiative identified several corridors, each extending hundreds of miles, across the country that might benefit from high-speed maglev trains. They correspond significantly with the high-speed rail corridors identified in October 1992 following the ISTEA legislation, but were generally more extensive and had other differences.

Maglev technology has largely stagnated in the U.S., with no real revenue deployments. Meanwhile, the longest maglev line in the world used for revenue service is the Shanghai Maglev Train in Shanghai, China, which is less than 19 miles (31 km) in length.

== Related efforts ==
Some related legislation and government efforts in the United States include:

- High Speed Ground Transportation Act and the Office of High Speed Ground Transportation (1965–1972)
- Passenger Railroad Rebuilding Act of 1980 (allowed funding of corridor studies in 1984)
- Rail Safety Improvement Act of 1988 (changed the legal definition of "railroad" to include maglevs)
- Maglev Technology Advisory Committee (1989)
- High-Speed Rail Transportation Act (1991)
- Swift Rail Development Act (1994)
- Maglev Study Advisory Committee (1997)
- Transportation Equity Act for the 21st Century (TEA-21, 1998)
- National Magnetic Levitation Transportation Technology Deployment Program Deployment Program (1999)

== See also ==
- High-speed rail in the United States
