= Gulf Coast Corridor =

Prospective high-speed rail network in the Southern US

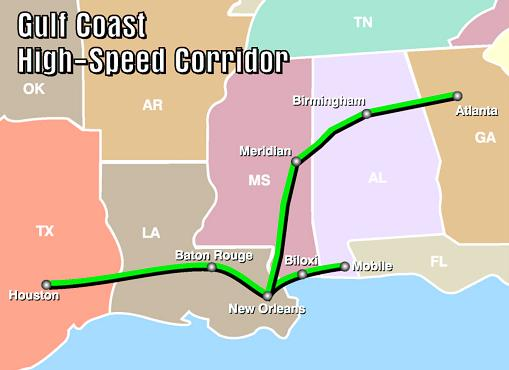
Corridor as designated by the Federal Railroad Administration

The Gulf Coast Corridor is one of ten federally designated high-speed rail corridors in the United States. The proposed corridor consists of three segments, each of which would carry trains capable of traveling at speeds of up to 110 mph:

- Houston, Texas, to New Orleans, Louisiana (362 miles)
- Mobile, Alabama, to New Orleans (139 miles)
- New Orleans to Atlanta, Georgia (521 miles)

== See also ==
- High-speed rail in the United States
