= Texas Central Railway =

Proposed private high-speed rail line

Texas Central

Overview
- Status: Planned
- Locale: Texas
- Termini: Houston; Dallas
- Stations: 3
- Website: www.texascentral.com

Service
- Type: High-speed rail
- Services: 1
- Operator(s): Texas Central Partners, LLC
- Rolling stock: N700S Series Shinkansen

History
- Planned opening: Early 2030s (if funding is obtained)

Technical
- Line length: 240 mi (390 km)
- Number of tracks: 2
- Character: fully grade separated
- Track gauge: 4 ft 8 1/2 in (1,435 mm) standard gauge
- Electrification: 25 kV 60 Hz AC overhead catenary
- Operating speed: 186–205 mph (300–330 km/h)

Texas Central or Texas Central Partners, LLC, is a private company that is proposing to build a high-speed rail line between Dallas/Fort Worth and Houston. It plans to use technology based on that used by the Central Japan Railway Company and trains based on the N700S Series Shinkansen. The proposed route would take 90 minutes.

On April 11, 2024, the governments of the United States and Japan signaled support for the project after their leaders met in Washington. Amtrak briefly took over planning of the project with estimates that it would cost more than $30 billion and could start service in the early 2030s. However, following the withdrawal of a federal grant by the second Trump administration, Amtrak ended its involvement in the project in April 2025, returning the initiative to private control.

== Management history ==
Lone Star High-Speed Rail LLC was founded in 2009, changing its name to Texas Central Railway in 2012. Texas Central Partners, LLC (TCP), was founded on September 24, 2013, as the company to build and operate the service, with the rail line itself owned by the separate Texas Central Railway (TCR). Texas Central Partners is working with the Federal Railroad Administration (FRA) and TxDOT to develop the Environmental Impact Statement required by NEPA. In July 2015 the company announced that it had secured $75 million of private funding to allow the project to move forward from feasibility studies to development planning.

On June 11, 2022, CEO Carlos Aguilar stepped down after leading Texas Central since December 2016. Since 2022, Michael Bui acts as CEO.

In 2023, Amtrak began working with the company to revive the project, including submitting applications to federal programs for grant funds. In April 2024, Amtrak formally took over planning of the project. At that time, estimates suggested the project would cost more than $30 billion, with a potential service start in the early 2030s. Andy Byford, Amtrak's vice president of High-Speed Rail Development, stated that Amtrak was assembling a public and private funding package to finance the project. In August 2024, the project was awarded a $64 million federal grant from the Infrastructure Investment and Jobs Act to continue planning. Significant changes occurred in early 2025. In January, ownership shifted when John Kleinheinz became the lead investor, with Kleinheinz Capital Partners buying out the Japanese investors. However, in April 2025, the federal grant was revoked by the second Trump administration. Following this withdrawal of funding, Amtrak ended their involvement in the project.

== Route ==
On August 10, 2015, the U.S. Department of Transportation and Federal Railroad Administration (FRA) issued a report that supported the so-called utility corridor for the line. In December 2017, the FRA further released their draft environment impact statement for the High-Speed Rail that proposed the preferred route.

From the station in Dallas, located on the west side of The Cedars with pedestrian walkways connecting to Kay Bailey Hutchison Convention Center, the route runs on elevated tracks parallel to a BNSF Railway line leaving the Dallas-Fort Worth Metroplex. The line then proceeds through Ellis, Navarro, Freestone, Limestone, Leon, and Madison counties. One intermediate station is planned for unincorporated Grimes County in order to serve the metropolitan area of Bryan–College Station and the city of Huntsville, Texas, which collectively include more than 100,000 students at Texas A&M University (the state's largest), Blinn College, and Sam Houston State University. The line then passes through Waller County before entering Harris County and the Houston area. The train line would run parallel to U.S. 290, Hempstead Highway and a Union Pacific Railroad freight line before ending at the Houston station, site of the former Northwest Mall.

Travis County Judge Andy Brown is advocating to extend the rail line from College Station to Austin, San Antonio and beyond.

== Rolling stock ==
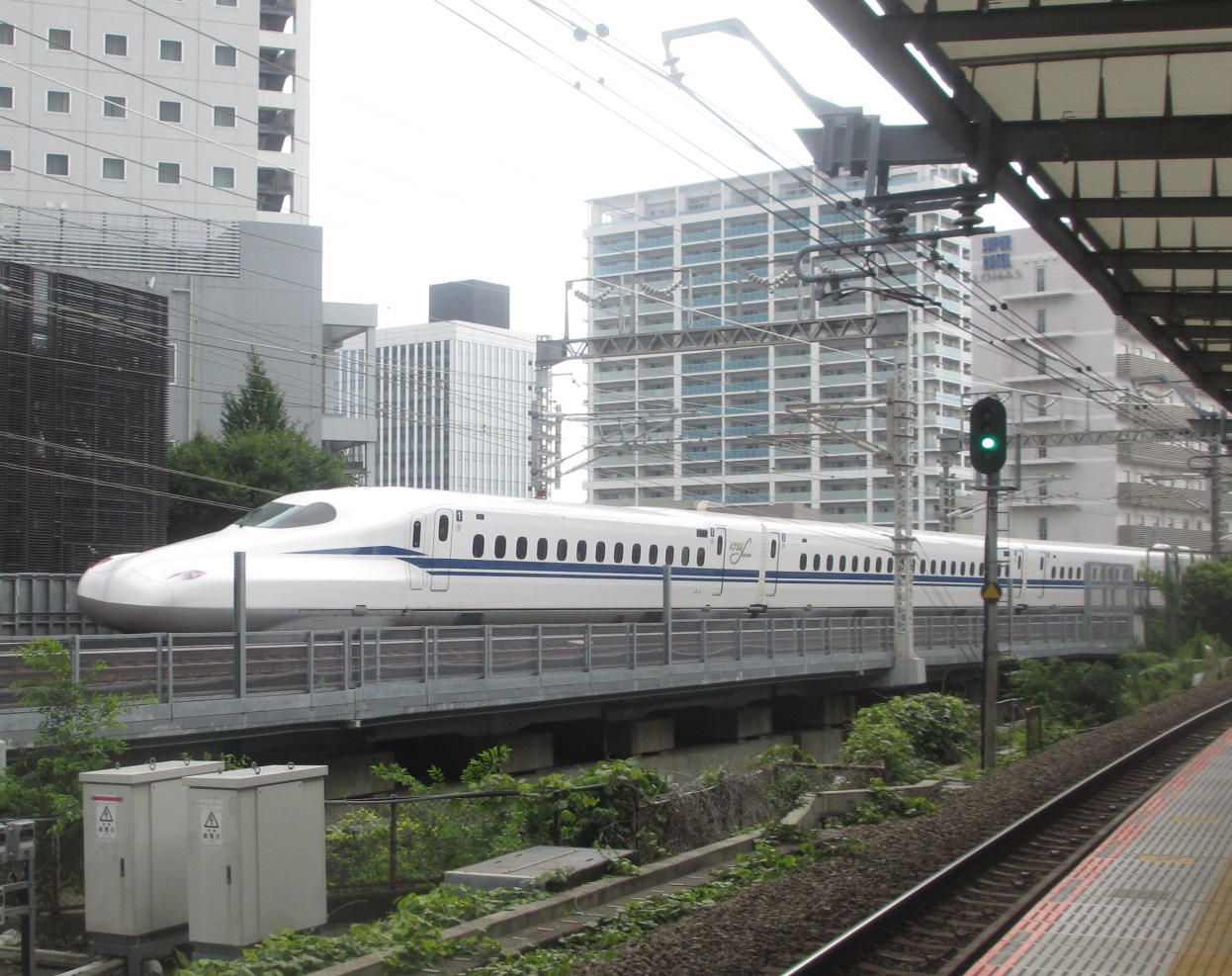
An N700S bullet train at Musashi-Kosugi Station in Kawasaki, Kanagawa, Japan

The line was expected to use a variation of the N700 Series Shinkansen modified for export, referred to as the N700-I. However, following the launch of the N700S in Japan, focus has shifted onto this newer model. Its modular buildup makes it easier to change the train length from the 16 cars used in Japan and it is tested for higher top speeds, removing the need to perform expensive modifications. Trains in the US will consist of eight cars and are expected to have a top speed of 205 mph (330 km/h). Their tested speed in Japan is 224 mph (360 km/h), but they are only allowed to operate at 186 mph (299 km/h) due to strict noise regulations, as trains pass through many urban residential areas.

=== Signalling ===
The signaling of the line is likely to be a replica of the digital ATC system used on Tokaido Shinkansen.

== Construction plans and contractors ==
In January 2017, President Donald Trump's administration listed the project as a national transportation infrastructure priority.

In June 2017, it was stated that construction would begin in 2019 and would support 10,000 jobs during each year of the construction process and 1,500 permanent jobs once operations begin. In May 2018, Texas Central announced that global engineering firm Bechtel will work with bullet train developer Texas Central on project management. On September 13, 2018, the company earned a $300 million loan for permitting, design and engineering. The company selected Salini Impregilo and its U.S. subsidiary Lane Construction Company to lead the civil construction consortium that will build the Texas passenger line, to the top of the rails, including viaducts, embankments and drainage.

In January 2018, plans for the station in Dallas were released as the preferred location identified by the Federal Railroad Administration in their Draft Environmental Impact Statement.

In October 2018, Texas Central named Spanish railway company Renfe Operadora as the train's operating partner. Spain has the largest and most sophisticated high-speed rail system in the Western world, most of it consisting of Renfe's AVE. Renfe will run the trains; maintain system components, such as the engines, signals and other equipment; oversee ticketing, passenger loyalty programs and other services.

In September 2019, Texas Central signed a further design-build contract with the joint venture Salini-Lane to lead the effort to supply the civil infrastructure scope of design, construction and installation as well as the design and construction of the viaduct and embankment sections along the entire route, the installation of the track system and the alignment and construction of all buildings and services along the route that will house maintenance and other rail system equipment. Construction is slated to begin as early as 2021 and end in 2026.

In February 2019, Texas Central announced that it had contracted Resource Environmental Solutions (RES) for ecological mitigation services to help protect and enhance natural ecosystems and the environmental throughout construction and operations. Also that month, Texas Central named Citi and MUFG as its financial advisers to spearhead its capital-raising efforts. The Federal permitting the Record of Decision was due by March 27, 2020, and a $5.9 billion design and operation contract was awarded to Renfe in February 2020. FRA regulatory approvals came in September 2020, with construction expected to commence relatively shortly thereafter.

In June 2021, the $16 billion design and construction contract for the line itself was awarded to Webuild, with construction expected to begin in late 2021 or early 2022.

In September 2021, the CEO of Texas Central, Carlos Aguilar, stated in an interview that there was a 50/50 chance that construction would commence within six months, and that much depended on a major infrastructure bill passing the US Congress.

However, the operational partnership faced significant changes in 2025. Renfe ended its cooperation with Texas Central in June 2025 after the liquidation of its American subsidiary, Renfe of America LLC.

== Legal issues ==
The right-of-way to be acquired from private property owners is a significant factor for the project. Ranchers living along the proposed route have challenged the company's attempts to survey and construct the line, questioning their right to eminent domain. Grimes County has opposed the project.

Texas Central Railroad filed a lawsuit against a landowner that refused to allow survey crews onto his land. The railroad filed for summary judgment in the case, Texas Central Railroad and Infrastructure vs Calvin House, arguing that it was entitled to require private landowners to allow land surveys for possible future eminent domain purchases under Texas state law. However, in a December 2016 ruling, a Harris County court denied the railroad's petition for summary judgment.

In February 2019, a Leon County District Judge ruled that Texas Central is not a railroad company and therefore does not have the right to conduct surveys on private land.

In July 2019, Texas's 14th Court of Appeals reversed a previous decision by a lower court which granted summary judgment and issued a permanent injunction in Grimes County's public-nuisance suit against Texas Central and Pacheco Koch Consulting Engineers, Inc.

In May 2020, Texas's 13th Court of Appeals ruled that Texas Central Railroad and Infrastructure, Inc. and Integrated Texas Logistics, Inc. are both railroad companies and interurban electric railways.

The case James Fredrick Miles v. Texas Central Railroad and Integrated Texas Logistics, Inc. was appealed to the Supreme Court of Texas. The Ellis County commissioners' court, and other counties along the proposed route which oppose high-speed rail, filed an amicus brief in support of the challenge to the project. On June 18, 2021, the state supreme court denied review without comment, thereby letting stand the lower appellate court's ruling. A motion for rehearing was filed by the landowner on July 29, 2021, which was followed by numerous amicus curiae letters weighing in on the merits of the project.

On October 15, 2021, the Texas Supreme Court withdrew its denial, reinstated the petition, and set the case for oral argument on January 11, 2022. The key legal issue is whether Texas Central qualifies as a "railroad company" or an "interurban electric railway," and whether an entity must show reasonable probability of project completion to invoke eminent domain authority under Texas Rice Land Partners, LTD. v. Denbury Green Pipeline-Texas, LLC, 363 S.W.3d 192 (Tex. 2012).

On July 16, 2020, the federal Surface Transportation Board ruled that Texas Central Railroad is part of the interstate rail network based on its through-ticketing with Amtrak, and therefore subject to the STB's jurisdiction.

In June 2022, the Supreme Court of Texas ruled 5–3 that Texas Central has eminent domain authority on land that is needed to build the rail line.

== Political support and opposition ==
The project has generated a sharp divide between urban centers, which largely support the high-speed link, and rural counties along the route. While officials in the major metropolitan areas have championed the project, rural jurisdictions have frequently opposed it. Travis County Judge Andy Brown has advocated for extending the line beyond the current route to serve Austin and San Antonio. Conversely, counties such as Grimes County and the Ellis County commissioners' court have formally opposed the project, citing concerns over land rights and the disruption of rural communities. Federal stance on the project has shifted with administrative changes. In April 2024, under the Biden administration, the United States and Japan signaled strong support for the initiative following a diplomatic summit. This led to the awarding of a federal grant to Amtrak for planning. However, the political landscape changed in 2025 with the second Trump administration, which revoked the Amtrak grant in April 2025, effectively halting direct federal funding for the project at that time.

== See also ==
- High-speed rail in Texas
- South Central Corridor
- Brightline West
- California High-Speed Rail
