= South Central Corridor =

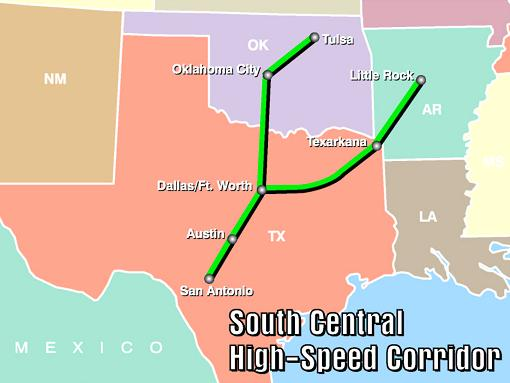
Corridor as designated by the Federal Railroad Administration

The South Central Corridor is one of ten federally designated high-speed rail corridors in the United States. The proposed corridor consists of two segments:

- Tulsa, Oklahoma, to Fort Worth, Texas (322 miles)
- Little Rock, Arkansas, via Dallas/Fort Worth to San Antonio, Texas (672 miles)

== See also ==
- High-speed rail in the United States
- Texas Central Railway – a proposed high-speed railway between Dallas and Houston
