= High-speed rail in the United States =

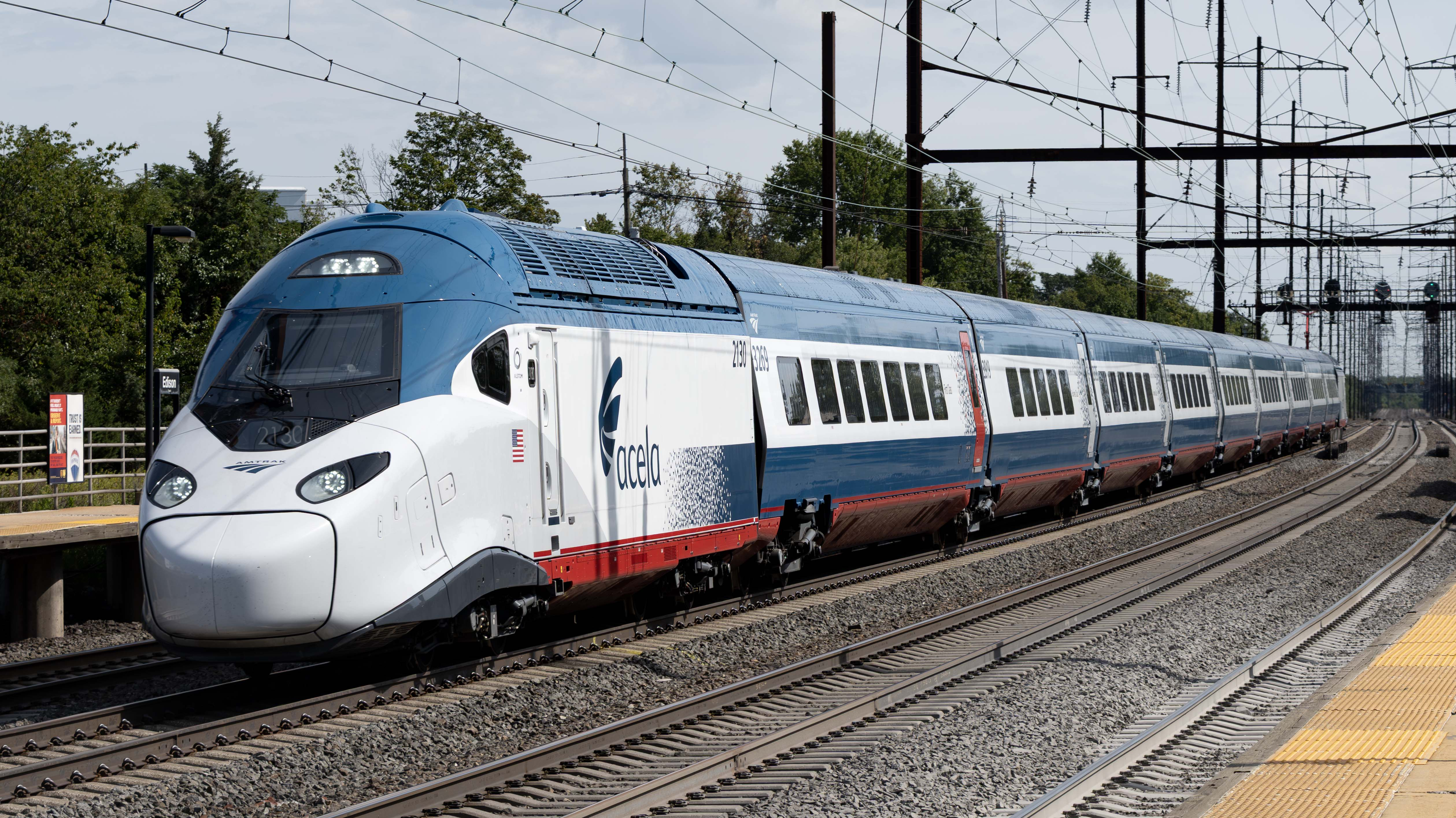
Amtrak Acela train

High-speed rail in the United States dates back to the High-Speed Ground Transportation Act of 1965. Various state and federal proposals have followed. Despite being one of the world's first countries to get high-speed trains (the Metroliner service in 1969), they are still limited to the East Coast and the Midwest of the United States. Definitions of what constitutes high-speed rail vary; the United States Department of Transportation defines high-speed rail as trains with a top speed of 110 mph (177 km/h) and above. Inter-city rail with top speeds between 90 and 110 mph (140 and 180 km/h) is referred to in the United States as higher-speed rail, though some states define high-speed rail with top speeds above 90 mph (140 km/h). The New York Times and Al Jazeera, however, do not consider the United States to have any high-speed rail. The assessment of most rail experts is similar.

Amtrak's Acela, operating between Washington, DC, and Boston, Massachusetts, is North America's fastest rail service, reaching a top speed of 160 mph (260 km/h) on a total of 50 miles (80 km) of track along the Northeast Corridor. Between Washington, DC, and New York City, the Acela operates at an average speed of 82 mph (132 km/h). NextGen Acela reaches top speeds of 160 mph (255 km/h) on 35 miles (56 km) of its 457-mile (735 km) route. The Times said the NexGen Acela was "not, however, meaningfully faster, and still lag[ging] far behind high-speed rail in countries like China, Japan and France, where trains can surpass 200 mph." Speeds are limited by the age of the Northeast Corridor's infrastructure and catenary wires.

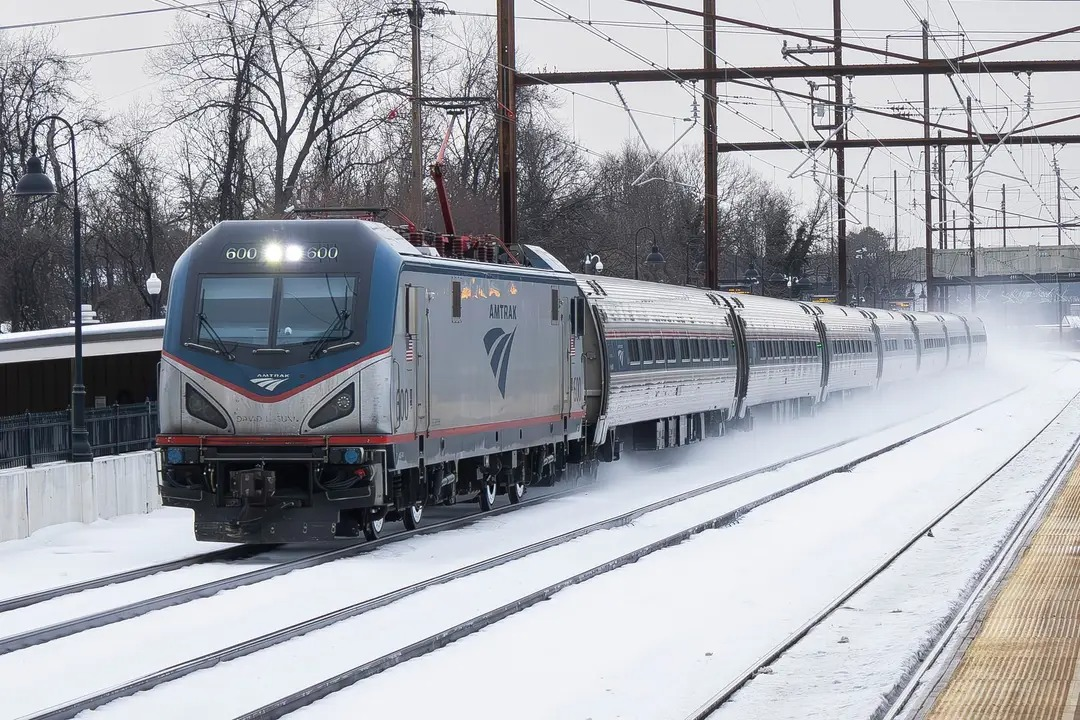
Amtrak Northeast Regional train

Amtrak's Northeast Regional service, while slower than the Acela, reaches a top speed of 125 mph (201 km/h) on some portions of its route, with an average speed of more than 67 mph (108 km/h). With more than 12 million riders in 2025, the Northeast Regional is Amtrak's most popular high-speed train.

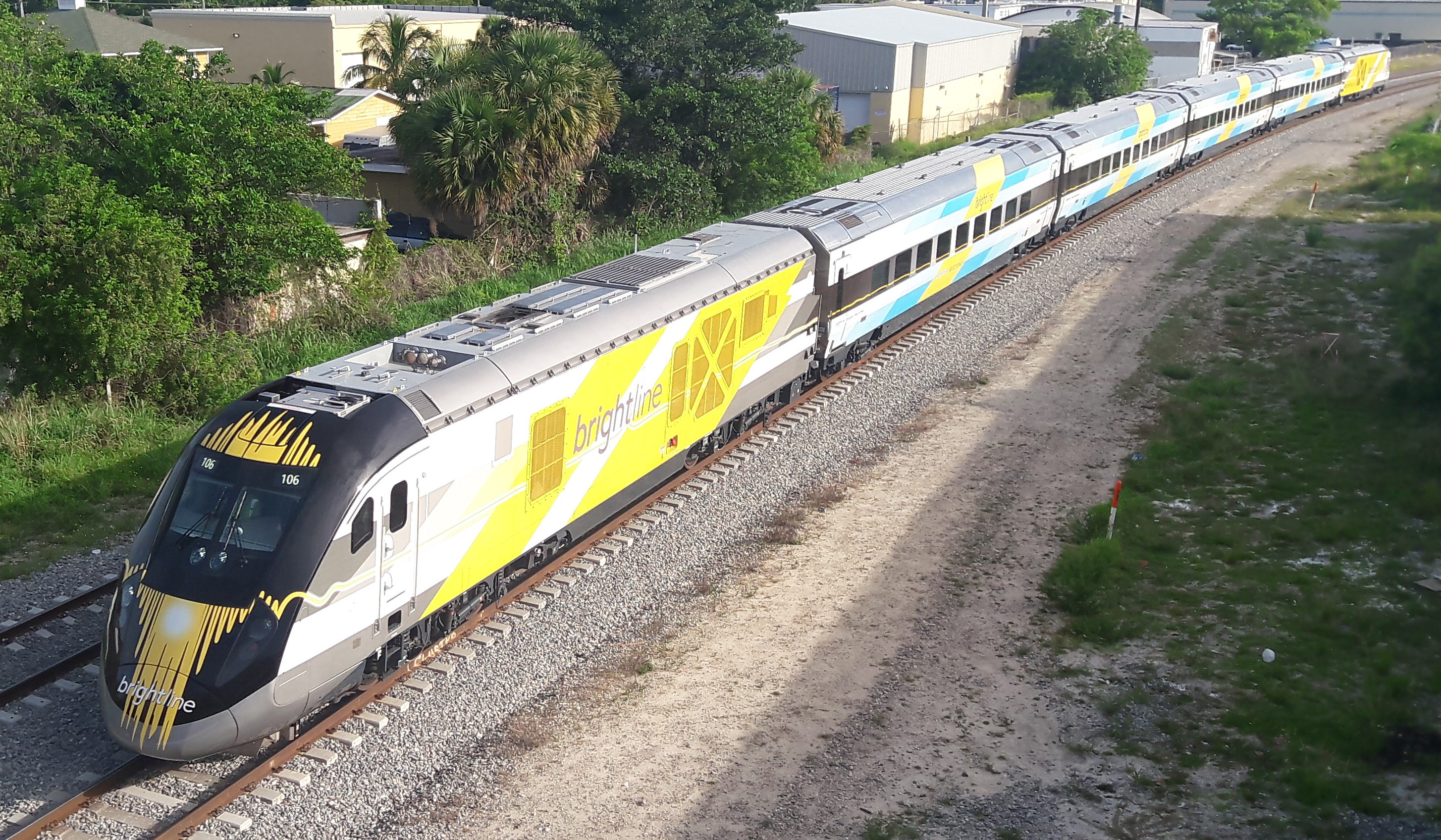
Brightline train

In total, Amtrak's high-speed services (Acela, Northeast Regional, Lincoln Service, etc.) achieved a historical ridership of about 22 million passengers, 64% of Amtrak's total ridership in 2025.

Florida's Brightline is the first privately owned high-speed rail company in the United States. Brightline trains achieve a top speed of 125 mph (201 km/h) along 20 miles (32 km) of newly built track, though most of the route is limited to a top speed of 110 mph (180 km/h) due to the presence of grade crossings, with speeds at 79 mph (127 km/h) or less in urban areas.

Brightline West, another venture of Brightline, is currently under construction between the Las Vegas Valley and Rancho Cucamonga in the Greater Los Angeles area. Trains will reach a top speed of 200 mph (320 km/h) and service is expected to begin in September 2029.

Map of high-speed rail lines in the United States

The California High-Speed Rail Authority is working on the California High-Speed Rail project, connecting San Francisco and Los Angeles. The Central Valley section, between Merced and Bakersfield, will have a maximum speed of 220 mph (350 km/h) and is planned to begin passenger service by 2030.

== List of high-speed intercity trains in the United States ==
All trains are operated by Amtrak, with the exception of Brightline. Trains with top speeds of 90 mph (145 km/h) are also included.

East Coast
Service name	Route	Top speed	Average speed (including stops)	Route Length	High Speed Line / Section	Equipment Type	Notes
Acela	Washington, DC–Boston, MA	160 mph (260 km/h)(Avelia Liberty)	72 mph (116 km/h)	457 miles (735 km)	Northeast Corridor	Electric trainset	
Northeast Regional	Washington, DC–Boston, MA, and other routes	125 mph (201 km/h)	67 mph (108 km/h)	682 miles (1,098 km)	Northeast Corridor	Electric/diesel-electric locomotive-hauled coaches	Will be replaced with Amtrak Airo trainsets.
Brightline	Miami, FL–Orlando, FL	125 mph (201 km/h)	69 mph (111 km/h)	235 miles (378 km)	Florida East Coast Railway, Brightline	Diesel-electric trainset	
Keystone Service	New York, NY–Harrisburg, PA	125 mph (201 km/h)	56 mph (90 km/h)	195 miles (314 km)	Philadelphia–Harrisburg Main Line, Northeast Corridor	Electric locomotive-hauled coaches	Will be replaced with Amtrak Airo trainsets.
Pennsylvanian	New York, NY–Pittsburgh, PA	125 mph (201 km/h)	48 mph (77 km/h)	444 miles (715 km)	Philadelphia–Harrisburg Main Line, Northeast Corridor	Electric/diesel-electric locomotive-hauled coaches	Will be replaced with Amtrak Airo trainsets.
Carolinian	New York, NY–Charlotte, NC	125 mph (201 km/h)	52 mph (84 km/h)	704 miles (1,133 km)	Northeast Corridor	Electric/diesel-electric locomotive-hauled coaches	Will be replaced with Amtrak Airo trainsets.
Vermonter	Washington, DC–St. Albans, VT	125 mph (201 km/h)	48 mph (77 km/h)	611 miles (983 km)	New Haven–Springfield Line, Northeast Corridor	Electric/diesel-electric locomotive-hauled coaches	Will be replaced with Amtrak Airo trainsets.
Valley Flyer	New Haven, CT–Greenfield, MA	110 mph (180 km/h)	37 mph (60 km/h)	102 miles (164 km)	New Haven–Springfield Line	Diesel-electric locomotive-hauled coaches	
Amtrak Hartford Line	New Haven, CT–Springfield, MA	110 mph (180 km/h)	48 mph (77 km/h)	62 miles (100 km)	New Haven–Springfield Line	Diesel-electric locomotive-hauled coaches	
Empire Service	New York, NY–Niagara Falls, NY	110 mph (180 km/h)	52 mph (84 km/h)	460 miles (740 km)	Empire Corridor	Electric/diesel-electric locomotive-hauled coaches	Will be replaced with Amtrak Airo trainsets.
Maple Leaf	New York, NY–Toronto, ON	110 mph (180 km/h)	44 mph (71 km/h)	544 miles (875 km)	Empire Corridor	Electric/diesel-electric locomotive-hauled coaches	Will be replaced with Amtrak Airo trainsets.
Ethan Allen Express	New York, NY–Burlington, VT	110 mph (180 km/h)	41 mph (66 km/h)	310 miles (500 km)	Empire Corridor	Electric/diesel-electric locomotive-hauled coaches	Will be replaced with Amtrak Airo trainsets.
Adirondack	New York, NY–Montreal, QC	110 mph (180 km/h)	35 mph (56 km/h)	381 miles (613 km)	Empire Corridor	Electric/diesel-electric locomotive-hauled coaches	Will be replaced with Amtrak Airo trainsets.

Midwest
Service name	Route	Top speed	Average speed (including stops)	Route length	High Speed Line / Section	Equipment Type	Notes
Lincoln Service	Chicago, IL–St. Louis, MO	110 mph (180 km/h)	57 mph (92 km/h)	284 miles (457 km)	Joliet Subdivision & Springfield Subdivision (Union Pacific)	Diesel-electric locomotive-hauled coaches	
Lincoln Service Missouri River Runner	Chicago, IL - Kansas City, MO	110 mph (180 km/h)	51 mph (82 km/h)	567 miles (912 km)	Joliet Subdivision & Springfield Subdivision (Union Pacific)	Diesel-electric locomotive-hauled coaches	
Wolverine	Chicago, IL–Pontiac, MI	110 mph (180 km/h)	52 mph (84 km/h)	304 miles (489 km)	Michigan Line	Diesel-electric locomotive-hauled coaches	
Blue Water	Chicago, IL–Port Huron, MI	110 mph (180 km/h)	49 mph (79 km/h)	319 miles (513 km)	Michigan Line	Diesel-electric locomotive-hauled coaches	

West Coast
Service name	Route	Top speed	Average speed (including stops)	Route Length	Equipment Type	High Speed Line / Section	Notes
Pacific Surfliner	San Diego, CA–San Luis Obispo, CA	90 mph (145 km/h)	40 mph (64 km/h)	350 miles (560 km)	Diesel-electric locomotive-hauled coaches	Coast Line & Surf Line	Generally defined as higher-speed rail.

== List of high-speed long-distance trains in the United States ==
All high-speed long-distance trains have sleeping cars, with the exception of the Palmetto. All trains are operated by Amtrak.

Service name	Route	Top speed	Average speed (including stops)	Route Length	High Speed Line / Section	Equipment Type	Notes
Palmetto	New York, NY–Savannah, GA	125 mph (201 km/h)	54 mph (87 km/h)	829 miles (1,334 km)	Northeast Corridor	Electric/diesel-electric locomotive-hauled coaches	Will be replaced with Amtrak Airo trainsets.
Silver Meteor	New York, NY–Miami, FL	125 mph (201 km/h)	50 mph (80 km/h)	1,389 miles (2,235 km)	Northeast Corridor	Electric/diesel-electric locomotive-hauled coaches	
Crescent	New York, NY–New Orleans, LA	125 mph (201 km/h)	44 mph (71 km/h)	1,377 miles (2,216 km)	Northeast Corridor	Electric/diesel-electric locomotive-hauled coaches	
Cardinal	New York, NY–Chicago, IL	125 mph (201 km/h)	41 mph (66 km/h)	1,146 miles (1,844 km)	Northeast Corridor	Electric/diesel-electric locomotive-hauled coaches	
Lake Shore Limited	New York, NY–Chicago, IL Boston, MA–Chicago, IL	110 mph (180 km/h)	48 mph (77 km/h) (New York, NY–Chicago, IL) 46 mph (74 km/h) (Boston, MA–Chicago, IL)	959 miles (1,543 km) (New York, NY–Chicago, IL) 1,018 miles (1,638 km) (Boston, MA–Chicago, IL)	Empire Corridor	Electric/diesel-electric locomotive-hauled coaches	
Texas Eagle	Chicago, IL–San Antonio, TX (Joins tri-weekly with the Sunset Limited at San Antonio and continues on to Los Angeles) Chicago, IL–Los Angeles, CA	100 mph (161 km/h) (Chicago, IL–San Antonio, TX) 79 mph (127 km/h) (San Antonio, TX–Los Angeles, CA section)	43 mph (69 km/h)	1,306 miles (2,102 km) (Chicago, IL–San Antonio, TX) 2,728 miles (4,390 km) (Chicago, IL–Los Angeles, CA)	Joliet Subdivision & Springfield Subdivision (Union Pacific)	Diesel-electric locomotive-hauled coaches	Generally defined as higher-speed rail’.
Southwest Chief	Chicago, IL–Los Angeles, CA	90 mph (145 km/h)	53 mph (85 km/h)	2,265 miles (3,645 km)	BNSF, Amtrak	Diesel-electric locomotive-hauled coaches	Generally defined as higher-speed rail’.

== List of high-speed commuter trains in the United States ==
Service name	Route	Top speed	Average speed (including stops)	Route Length	Equipment Type	High Speed Line / Section	Notes
MARC Penn Line	Washington, DC–Perryville, MD	125 mph (201 km/h)	44 mph (71 km/h)	77 miles (124 km)	Electric/diesel-electric locomotive-hauled coaches	Northeast Corridor	The fastest commuter trains in the United States.
NJ Transit Northeast Corridor Line	New York, NY–Trenton, NJ	100 mph (161 km/h)	N/A	N/A	Electric/electro-diesel locomotive-hauled coaches	Northeast Corridor	The fastest commuter trains in the United States.

== List of high-speed rail lines in the United States ==
Name	Route	Top Speed	Section Length	110 mph+ High-speed Services Began
Northeast Corridor	Washington, DC–Boston, MA	160 mph (260 km/h)	457 miles (735 km)	1969 (Washington-New York), 2000 (New York-Boston)
Brightline Cocoa–Orlando	Cocoa, FL–Orlando, FL	125 mph (201 km/h)	44 miles (71 km)	2023
Empire Corridor	New York, NY–Niagara Falls, NY (Buffalo, NY)	110 mph (180 km/h)	461 miles (742 km)	2012
Philadelphia–Harrisburg Main Line	Philadelphia, PA–Harrisburg, PA	110 mph (180 km/h)	103 miles (166 km)	2006
Michigan Line	Porter, IN (Chicago, IL)–Dearborn, MI (Detroit, MI)	110 mph (180 km/h)	232 miles (373 km)	2012
Joliet Subdivision & Springfield Subdivision (Union Pacific)	Joliet,IL (Chicago, IL)–Alton,IL (St. Louis, MO)	110 mph (180 km/h)	220 miles (350 km)	2012
New Haven–Springfield Line	New Haven, CT–Springfield, MA	110 mph (180 km/h)	62 miles (100 km)	2018
Florida East Coast Railway (Brightline)	West Palm Beach, FL (Miami, FL)–Cocoa, FL	110 mph (180 km/h)	125 miles (201 km)	2023
Total:			1,704 miles (2,742 km)	

== Definitional issues ==
Authorities in the United States maintain various definitions of high-speed rail. The United States Department of Transportation (USDOT), an entity in the executive branch, defines it as rail service with top speeds ranging from 110 to 150 miles per hour (180 to 240 km/h) or higher. National Geographic said that "There's no internationally set definition as to what qualifies as high-speed rail, but most industry experts agree it's 186 mph [300 kph]".

For transportation planning purposes focusing on the development of high-speed rail, the USDOT distinguishes four types of intercity passenger rail corridors:

- High-Speed Rail – Express: Frequent, express service between major population centers 200–600 miles (320–970 km) apart, with few intermediate stops. Top speeds of at least 150 mph (240 km/h) on completely grade-separated, dedicated rights-of-way (with the possible exception of some shared track in terminal areas). Intended to relieve air and highway capacity constraints.
- High-Speed Rail – Regional: Relatively frequent service between major and moderate population centers 100–500 miles (160–800 km) apart, with some intermediate stops. Top speeds of 125–150 mph (201–241 km/h), grade-separated, with some dedicated and some shared track (using positive train control technology). Intended to relieve highway and, to some extent, air capacity constraints.
- Emerging High-Speed Rail: Developing corridors of 100–500 miles (160–800 km), with strong potential for future HSR Regional and/or Express service. Top speeds of up to 90–125 mph (145–201 km/h) on primarily shared track (eventually using positive train control technology), with advanced grade crossing protection or separation. Intended to develop the passenger rail market, and provide some relief to other modes.
- Conventional Rail: Traditional intercity passenger rail services of more than 100 miles with as little as one to as many as 7–12 daily frequencies; may or may not have strong potential for future high-speed rail service. Top speeds of up to 79 mph (127 km/h) to as high as 90 mph (140 km/h) generally on shared track. Intended to provide travel options and to develop the passenger rail market for further development in the future.

Other entities within the federal government have adopted yet more definitions. In rail funding legislation, the United States Congress has variously defined high-speed rail as services that are "reasonably expected to reach sustained speeds of more than 125 miles per hour" (1998) or "reasonably expected to reach speeds of at least 110 miles per hour" (2008). The Federal Railroad Administration has eschewed speed-based definitions entirely, proffering that high-speed rail is any service "that is time-competitive with air and/or auto for travel markets in the approximate range of 100 to 500 miles".

State-level departments of transportation and council of governments may also use different definitions for high-speed rail. For examples, the North Central Texas Council of Governments uses the definition of speeds over 150 mph (240 km/h), and the Texas Department of Transportation and Oklahoma Department of Transportation use speeds of 165 mph (266 km/h) or more. These agencies have a separate category for higher-speed rail which can be a wide range of speeds between 80 mph (130 km/h) and 150 mph (240 km/h).

== History ==
The development of the American rail network during the 19th century created structural impediments to the adoption of high-speed rail in the latter half of the 20th century that were not present in Europe and Asia. Freight on American railroads had to travel vastly longer distances, so railroads developed longer cars that could be joined into longer trains. In contrast to Europe, these freights traveled past very few older buildings that were at risk of structural damage from vibrations created by heavy passing trains. Even today, American freight cars and their contents may be as heavy as 286,000 lb (130,000 kg), while their European counterparts are limited to 190,000 lb (86,000 kg).

With such long and heavy freights often sharing the same tracks as passenger trains, it was necessary to require that passenger cars be able to withstand the higher impact forces of a collision. Axial strength standards, first required for the mail cars where clerks worked sorting mail en route and later applied to passenger cars, require that an American passenger car be able to withstand 800,000 pounds-force (3,600 kN) applied to either end, as opposed to the 450,000 lb_{f} (2,000 kN) European regulations mandate. This results in American passenger cars being heavier.

=== Faster inter-city trains: 1920–1941 ===
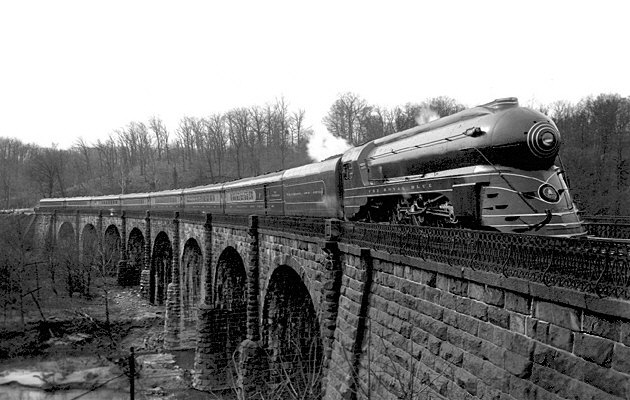
Streamlined 4-6-2 "President"-class steam locomotive on B&O's New York–Washington, D.C. Royal Blue in 1937

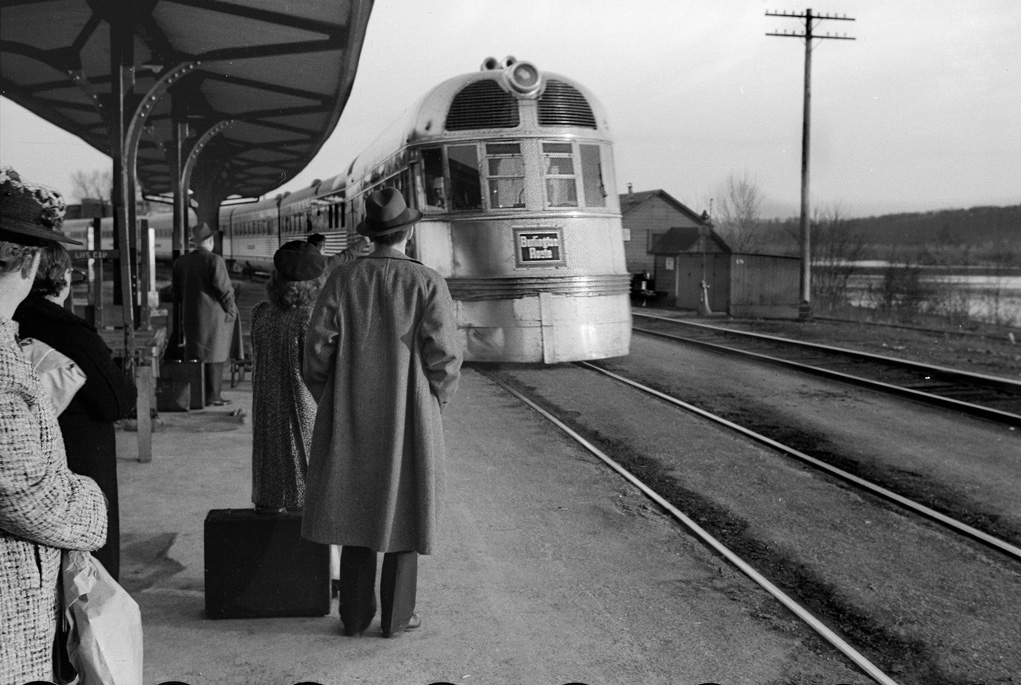
Burlington Pioneer Zephyr passenger train approaching station and waiting passengers at East Dubuque, Illinois, in 1940

In the 19th century, most long-distance travel in the United States was by horse-drawn wagon, or water vessels. At the end of the century, rail started to supplant these modes of travel, and during the pre-WWII period rail had become the preeminent mode of long-distance travel. Rail transportation was not high-speed by modern standards but inter-city travel often averaged speeds between 40 and 65 miles per hour (64 and 105 km/h). Most of the major railroads had faster than normal trains called "express" or "limited" on their mainline routes (e.g. the Empire State Express and the 20th Century Limited) between major towns and cities.

The development of faster trains faced indirect regulatory hurdles. After a 1921 crash at Porter, Indiana, in which a derail failed to stop one passenger train that had already passed through two red lights from crashing into another at a level junction, killing 37, the Interstate Commerce Commission (ICC) ordered almost a hundred railroads to install automatic train stops by the end of 1925. The railroads opposed the ICC vigorously, noting that stopping longer freights that way might lead to derailments. As a result, the requirement was revised to allow waivers for certain lines, and rarely enforced as the debate continued without any real resolution over the next two decades; in the meantime passenger fatalities began declining as the automobile emerged as a transportation option.

During the 1930s, railroads began to develop lightweight, diesel-powered streamlined locomotives which provided even faster running times than the previous express trains. Two early streamliners were the Union Pacific M-10000 (nicknamed Little Zip and The City of Salina) in revenue service between 1934 and 1942 and the Burlington Railroad's Zephyr. The design of the Zephyr incorporated a diesel-electric power system; the M-10000 used a spark-ignition engine running on "petroleum distillate", a fuel similar to kerosene. These trains were much lighter than the common engines and passenger cars of the day, as the "Zephyr" was constructed using stainless steel and the M-10000 chiefly of the aircraft alloy Duralumin.

On May 26, 1934, the Zephyr made a record-breaking "Dawn to Dusk" run from Denver to Chicago. The train covered the distance in 13 hours, reaching a top speed of 112.5 mph (181.1 km/h) and running at an average speed of 77.6 mph (124.9 km/h). The railroad was unable to capitalize on this since the Depression had cut into the demand for intercity rail travel.

Many steam locomotives were streamlined during this time to attract passengers, and the first steam streamlined locomotive was the New York Central's Commodore Vanderbilt. Some of these steam locomotives became very fast: some were said to exceed 120 mph (190 km/h) on a regular basis. Examples include the New York Central's "Super Hudsons" as used on the 20th Century Limited; the Milwaukee Road's purpose-built Atlantics and Hudsons used in Hiawatha service; the Pennsylvania Railroad's duplex-drive 4-4-4-4 type T1 locomotives, and two Union Pacific engines, a 4-6-2 and a 4-8-2, used on the "Forty Niner" and other trains.

=== Post-war period: 1945–1960 ===
The debate between the railroads and the ICC over signaling and train control ended after the Naperville train disaster in 1946. The conductor of an express passenger train had stopped the train in the town of Naperville, Illinois, outside Chicago, because he thought something was dragging; within two minutes it was struck from behind by another express passenger train traveling at 86 mph (138 km/h), killing 45. The engineer of the second train survived the crash, and claimed he had not seen the signal in time to stop his train. Investigation showed that even if he had missed the yellow light going on, warning him to slow down in anticipation of a red, he still had space to stop the train had he applied his full brakes at the red. As a result, the ICC decided the time had come to force the issue of train control.

For the first time it set national rail speed limits. In 1947 it ordered that automatic block signaling be used where freight traveled at more than 49 mph (79 km/h) and on passenger lines where trains went faster than 59 mph (95 km/h). This rule remains in force today.

While the railroads generally complied with this rule, affecting 18,000 miles (29,000 km) of track, they were not as tolerant of the ICC's additional requirement for ATS or cab signalling on passenger trains that exceeded 79 mph (127 km/h). Some railroads complied with the equipment requirement in part, and installed it on about 5,000 miles (8,000 km) of track. This was what the ICC had hoped for. But on the other 22,000 miles (35,000 km) where the rule applied, railroads instead ran their trains under the limit. This made intercity passenger rail an even less competitive option, accelerating its decline as automobile use was increasing and airlines were beginning to compete on longer routes. By the late 1950s many passenger routes that had existed at the time of the Naperville crash had been discontinued.

The results of World War II shifted further high-speed rail technological development overseas. While the U.S. had not suffered the infrastructure damage it had inflicted on Europe and Japan, it had also developed its road network, leading to the creation of the Interstate Highway System after the war. Europe and Japan, by contrast, had largely not begun to build highway networks and had seen heavy damage to their rail systems. With their citizens impoverished as they rebuilt their economies, and unable to afford automobiles to the extent Americans could, those countries invested in rail as the primary means of intercity travel.

=== First attempts: 1960–1992 ===
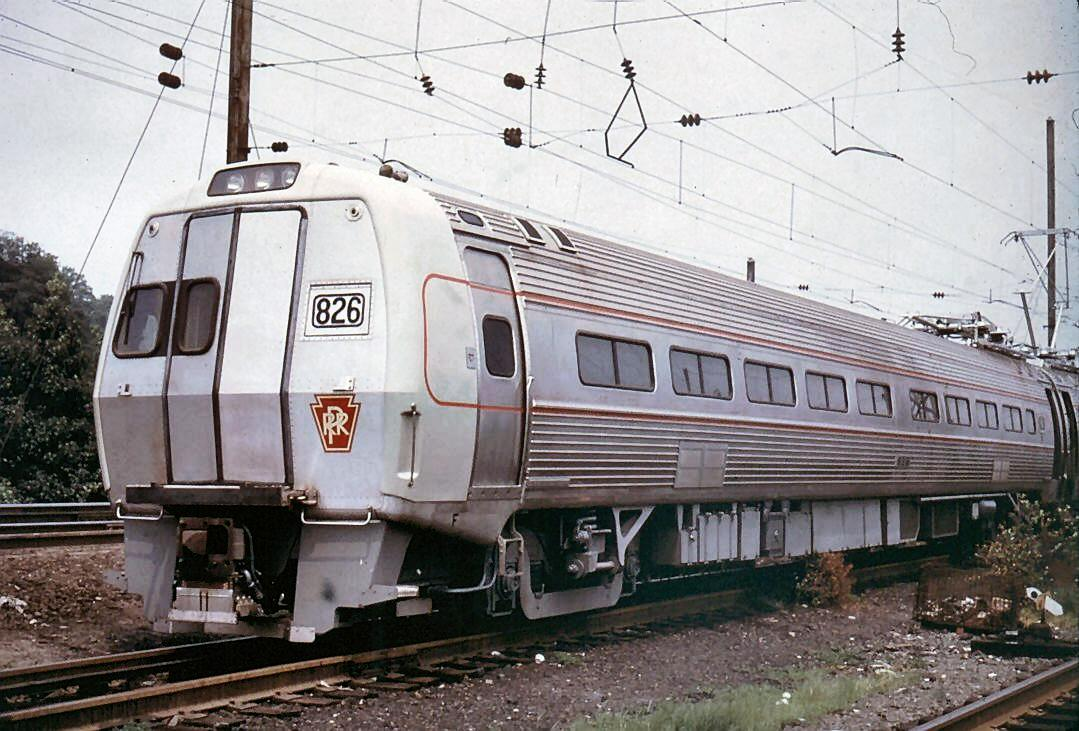
Metroliner trains were developed in the U.S. for rapid service between New York and Washington, DC.

Following the creation of Japan's first high-speed Shinkansen, U.S. President Lyndon B. Johnson asked the U.S. Congress to devise a way to increase speeds on American railroads. The request was part of his Great Society infrastructure building initiatives. Congress delivered the High-Speed Ground Transportation Act of 1965 which passed with overwhelming bi-partisan support. It helped to create regular Metroliner service between New York City and Washington, D.C., inaugurated in 1969. Trains on the line reached speeds of 125 mph (201 km/h) and averaged 90 mph (140 km/h) along the route. The Metroliner was able to travel from New York to Washington in just 2.5 hours because it did not make any intermediate stops.

U.S. federal and state governments continued to revisit the idea of fast trains. The Passenger Railroad Rebuilding Act of 1980 led to funding of high-speed corridor studies in 1984. Private-sector consortia intending to build high-speed lines were created in Florida, Ohio, Texas, California, and Nevada. Maglev trains became a new field of interest. They were officially added to the definition of "railroad" in 1988, and were studied repeatedly. Five high-speed corridors were officially endorsed in October 1992 following passage of the Intermodal Surface Transportation Efficiency Act of 1991. TEA-21 and other legislation continued to be passed with mentions of high-speed rail, but lacking funding or real direction. Nevertheless, no new high-speed service was added to the U.S. passenger rail system following the Metroliners.

=== Renewed interest: 1993–2008 ===
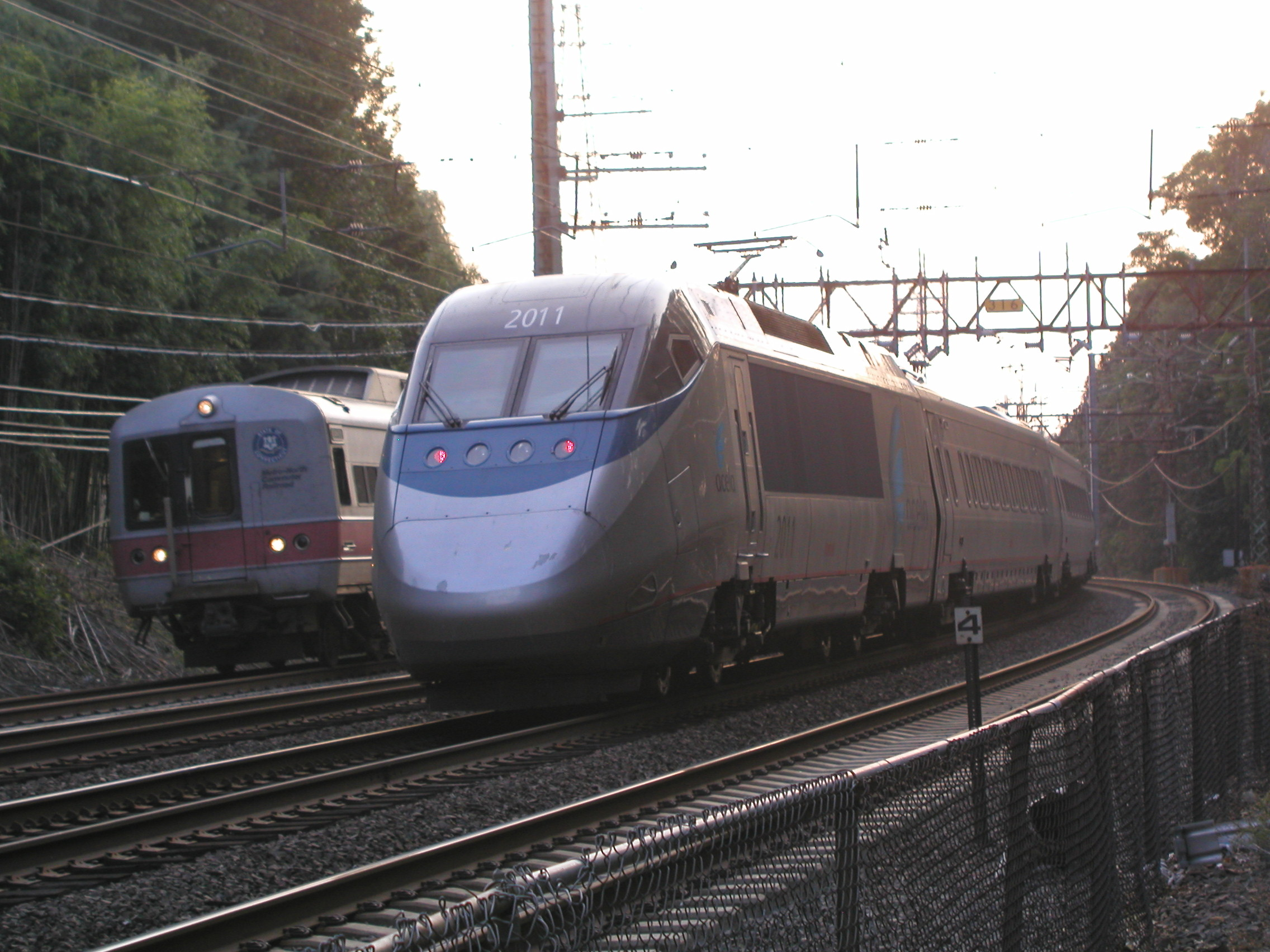
A Metro-North commuter passes an Acela express train going the opposite direction on the closer track. Both class trains share the same tracks through Connecticut.

In 1993, the U.S. attempted to improve service between Boston and New York by electrifying the Northeast Corridor north of New Haven, Connecticut and buying new train sets to replace the 30-year-old Metroliners and run on the newly electrified route. Some existing trains (Swedish X 2000 and German ICE 1) were tested, but finally, the Acela Express, a new tilting trainset manufactured by Alstom and Bombardier, was ordered.

The new service ran on the Northeast Corridor, linking Boston, New York City, Philadelphia, Baltimore, and Washington, D.C. The service was inaugurated in December 2000, and was an immediate success, operated at a profit and as of 2012, it produced about 25% of Amtrak's total service revenue. The Acela lacks a dedicated high-speed rail line which limits its average speed; it reaches a maximum speed of 150 mph (240 km/h) on small sections of its route through New Jersey, Rhode Island, and Massachusetts.

The travel time between Washington and New York is 2 hours and 43 minutes (compared to 2 hours and 30 minutes for PRR's nonstop Metroliner in 1969), or an average speed of 82 mph (132 km/h). In September 2019, Amtrak launched a nonstop New York to Washington which completes the trip in 2 hours and 35 minutes for an average speed of 87 mph (140 km/h). Schedule between New York and Boston is 3 hours 34 minutes, an average speed of only 63 mph (101 km/h). With a 15-minute layover in New York, the entire end-to-end trip averages 68 mph (109 km/h).

=== 2008–2015 ===
The largest project for American high-speed rail is the California High-Speed Rail network, which was authorized by voters with Proposition 1A in 2008. In August 2013, the Tutor Perini Corporation signed a $1-billion contract to begin construction of the first phase in 2014. Construction began in early 2015.

High-speed rail development was a goal of the Obama administration which came into office in January 2009. Higher jet fuel prices, congested airports and highways, and increasing airport security rules have combined to make high-speed rail a more attractive option for passengers. A study conducted by the International Union of Railways indicated that high-speed trains produced one fifth as much CO_{2} as automobiles and jet aircraft. The American Recovery and Reinvestment Act of 2009 dedicated $8 billion to intercity rail, with priority for high-speed projects.

In 2012, then-Amtrak president Joseph Boardman proposed a plan to build a dedicated high-speed rail line between Washington, D.C., and Boston. He estimated it would cost $151 billion and take more than 25 years to design and build the line. The proposed rail line would allow for top speeds of 220 mph (350 km/h).

== Current state and regional efforts ==
=== The Northeast ===
==== Northeast Corridor ====
Amtrak officials released a concept report for next-generation high-speed rail within the Northeast Corridor (NEC) on October 1, 2010. Amtrak projected planning and construction of the next-generation high-speed Northeast Corridor line to cost approximately $117 billion (2010 dollars) and reduce the travel time from New York to Washington, including a stop in Philadelphia, to 96 minutes, and the travel time from Boston to New York to 84 minutes by 2040. In 2012, Amtrak released the details of the proposal.

The first of two phases envisions the NEC to be upgraded allowing Acela speed improvements. By 2022, Acela trainsets were to be replaced with new trainsets, named Avelia Liberty, but this has since been pushed out to 2025. The new trainsets will be limited to the maximum speed supported by the NEC.

In 2012, the Federal Railroad Administration began developing a master plan for bringing high-speed rail to the Northeast Corridor titled NEC FUTURE, and released the final environmental impact statement in December 2016. The proposed alignment would closely follow the existing NEC south of New York City; multiple potential alignments north of New York City were studied, including the existing shoreline route, a route through Hartford, Connecticut, and a route out along Long Island which would traverse a new bridge or tunnel across Long Island Sound to Connecticut. On July 12, 2017, the Federal Railroad Administration revealed the record of decision for the project. The proposed upgrades have not been funded.

In 2023, the Federal Railroad Administration awarded $16.4 billion for 25 projects of significance along the Northeast Corridor, rebuilding tunnels and bridges, upgrading tracks, power systems, signals, stations, and other infrastructure. In 2024, following continuous efforts by the Bipartisan Infrastructure Law, the Federal Railroad Administration made $2 billion available for projects along the Northeast Corridor.

==== North Atlantic Rail ====
The North Atlantic Rail is a proposed high-speed railway to connect New York City to Boston in one hour, 40 minutes. The proposed railway would run across Long Island and tunnel under the Long Island Sound. The project, consisting of two phases, is estimated to cost a total of $105 billion as of 2023, which would be among the most expensive public works projects in United States history, and take 20 years to complete.

The first phase, costing $23.5 billion, would:

1. Modernize the New Haven Line from New Haven to Manhattan, completing improvements to make the journey time shorter
2. Complete the East-West rail link between Boston and Springfield, Massachusetts
3. Double track and electrify the Danbury and Waterbury branches, as well as the New Haven–Springfield Line in Connecticut
4. Extend the Danbury Branch to Pittsfield, Massachusetts
5. Modernize LIRR service between the Oyster Bay and Greenport branches
6. Create a new electrified commuter rail line from Concord, New Hampshire, to Boston
7. Create fast and frequent high speed rail service between Kingston, Rhode Island, and Boston
8. Upgrade the Valley Flyer from Springfield, Massachusetts, to Brattleboro, Vermont
9. Electrify the Newburyport/Rockport, Haverhill, Fairmount and Lowell Lines in Massachusetts

==== New York ====
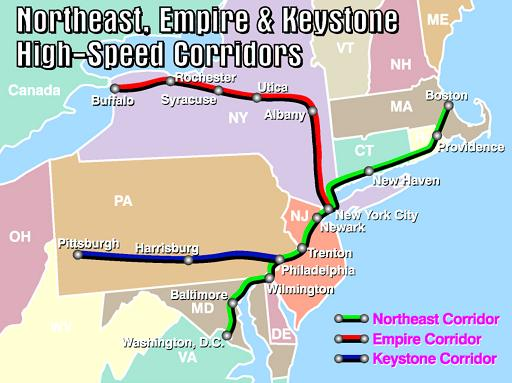
Keystone Corridor (blue), as designated by the Federal Railroad Administration

New York has been actively discussing high-speed rail service since the 1990s, but thus far little progress has been made. Amtrak Acela service between Washington, D.C., and Boston is available to New York City, but other cities remain isolated from high-speed rail service. Further, destinations outside the New York metropolitan area have been plagued by delayed service for decades. Nonetheless, New York has been quietly endorsing and even implementing rail improvements for years.

Closer and faster railroad transportation links between New York City and the rest of the state are frequently cited as a partial solution to Upstate's stagnant economic growth.

Beginning in 2010, a study conducted by the New York State Department of Transportation identified 10 alternatives for improving the Empire Corridor. In early 2014, a Tier 1 Draft Environmental Impact Statement was released for public review and comments. The draft eliminated 5 of the alternatives, including those with top speeds of 160 and 220 mph (260 and 350 km/h). The remaining 5 build alternatives under consideration have top speeds of 79 mph (127 km/h) (the base alternative), 90 mph (140 km/h) (options A and B), 110 mph (180 km/h), and 125 mph (201 km/h).

==== Pennsylvania ====
The Keystone Corridor is a 349 mi (562 km) rail corridor between Philadelphia and Pittsburgh, composed of two different rail lines, the Amtrak Philadelphia to Harrisburg Main Line and the Norfolk Southern Pittsburgh Line. Between Philadelphia and Harrisburg the Amtrak line is electrified and grade separation was completed in 2014. Between Harrisburg and Pittsburgh the Norfolk Southern owned line is used for freight transportation. In 1999, the Keystone Corridor was formally recognized as a "designated high-speed corridor" by the Federal Railroad Administration (FRA). The line, over which Amtrak's Pennsylvanian and Keystone Service routes operate, was upgraded in 2006 with two segments of 110 mph (180 km/h) track. These trains are higher-speed rail services between Philadelphia and Harrisburg, with express service taking 95–100 minutes over 103.6 mi (166.7 km).

=== Western States ===
==== California ====
Map of proposed route, also including the planned Brightline West (formerly Desert Xpress) to Las Vegas

California Proposition 1A, passed in November 2008, authorized the state to issue $9.95 billion in bonds to fund the first phase of a planned multi-phase high-speed rail network. Conventional steel-wheel on rail technology is the adopted mode with trains traveling at speeds of up to 220 miles per hour (350 km/h). Los Angeles to San Francisco via the Central Valley was expected to be the first phase of the network, though the initial operating segments have since become unclear. The California High-Speed Rail Authority (CHSRA) is the lead agency charged with planning and implementing the system. The state was awarded $2.55 billion in funding from the federal government in 2010.

Since the passage of Proposition 1A, cost estimates for the project have risen due to increased planning and disputes over routes. Ridership projections have faced scrutiny by a number of groups including the Reason Foundation. In May 2013, with cost estimates double the original figures approved by the voters in 2008, opponents filed lawsuits intended to invalidate the $10 billion bond measures which were part of the financing of the rail line.

By December 2018, the Authority had 119 miles (192 km) of right-of-way from Madera to near Bakersfield under contract and in construction. However, the estimated cost of a now scaled-down system had increased from $33.6 billion to $77.3 billion and, including federal funding, the California High-Speed Rail Authority had only about $12.7 billion - approximately one-eighth of the funding required. Governor Gavin Newsom has still expressed support for the project despite the funding shortfall, reduced scope, and swelling costs, which by 2023 were estimated in $128 billion.

XpressWest, a private undertaking begun in 2005 to build a high-speed service to Las Vegas, Nevada, was acquired by Brightline in 2018 and its name changed to Brightline West. In April 2020, The California Infrastructure and Economic Development Bank approved $3.25 billion in tax-exempt private activity bonds for the project and acquired a 50-year lease from Caltrans for use of the Interstate 15 corridor. The line, from Rancho Cucamonga station to a station near the Las Vegas Strip, was expected to open in 2028 in time for the 2028 Summer Olympics, but is now expected to begin service in September 2029, too late to coincide with the Olympics. Following the awarding of a $3 billion federal grant in December 2023, construction is currently underway.

Although the Surf Line between Los Angeles to San Diego, which hosts the Pacific Surfliner and commuter rail routes such as Metrolink and Coaster, has portions in Orange County and San Diego County that contains Class 5 trackage, which passenger trains can reach speeds up to 90 miles per hour (140 km/h), it would not be considered a high-speed rail line. However, there are plans to upgrade those stretches of track to Class 6 trackage, in which passenger trains can reach speeds up to 110 miles per hour (180 km/h), similar to portions of other passenger rail routes in the United States such as Lincoln Service between Chicago and St. Louis and portions of the Brightline West between West Palm Beach and Cocoa, Florida. As of 2024, funding has yet to be available.

==== Pacific Northwest ====
The Pacific Northwest Corridor or the Pacific Northwest Rail Corridor is one of eleven federally designated high-speed rail corridors in the United States. It was designated a high-speed rail by the Intermodal Surface Transportation Efficiency Act of 1991 (ISTEA). Improvements proposed in Washington State's long range plan would have had passenger trains operating at a maximum speed of 110 miles per hour (180 km/h) on line.

The Cascadia high-speed rail was a proposed dedicated high-speed rail line that would have connected Salem/Portland, Vancouver WA/Olympia/Tacoma/Seattle/Everett, and Bellingham, Washington.

As of 2012, neither the Washington State Department of Transportation nor Oregon plan to implement speeds higher than 79 mph (127 km/h) due to safety and other freight service concerns voiced by the track owner, Union Pacific Railroad. The plan to provide high-speed and higher-speed rail services on this corridor was thus halted. Upgraded services would include the Amtrak Cascades, which operates along the corridor.

In early 2018, Washington State pledged money to studying ultra-high-speed rail between Vancouver BC, Seattle, and Portland with 250 mph (400 km/h) speed operation. After a preliminary study, the state pledged $300,000 in funding and was shortly backed by British Columbia. The study was estimated to be completed by early 2019. Washington State Governor Jay Inslee has expressed his desire to see a Cascadia innovation corridor, linking together the main economic centers of the Pacific Northwest.

=== Mid-Atlantic and the South ===
==== Florida ====
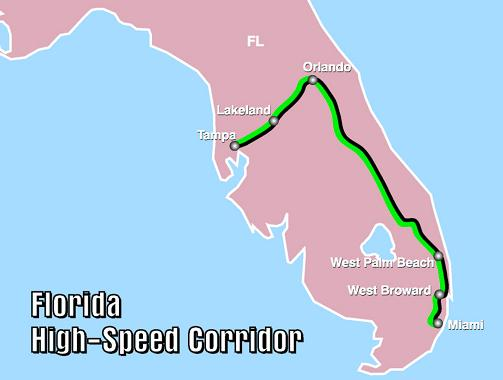
Federal Railroad Administration map of the Florida High-Speed Corridor

Development of a high-speed rail system in Florida was mandated by a constitutional referendum in 2000 but taken off the books by another referendum in 2004. Florida resurrected its high-speed rail authority to capitalize on the nationwide effort to build a high-speed rail network. Florida legislature approved SunRail in a special session in late 2009, which along with work already completed on the originally proposed line between Tampa and Orlando, was instrumental in the state winning a significant amount of the total amount allotted to high-speed rail. Only California received more high-speed rail funding than Florida. In February 2011, Florida's newly elected governor Rick Scott cancelled the project. Secretary of Transportation Ray LaHood then announced he would be redirecting the funds intended for Florida to other states.

In 2012, a plan for a 240 mi (390 km) high-speed rail from Miami to Orlando to be operated by a privately owned developer was announced. The plan, called All Aboard Florida, included a 40 mi (64 km) segment between Cocoa and Orlando with a top speed of 125 mph (201 km/h). The plan was later renamed Brightline, and began service between Fort Lauderdale and West Palm Beach on January 13, 2018, and to Miami on May 19, 2018, although only at speeds up to 79 mph (127 km/h). On September 22, 2023, service to Orlando with speeds up to 125 mph (201 km/h) on dedicated tracks, and 90 mph (145 km/h) on shared tracks began. In November 2023, most of the 90 mph sections were upgraded to 110 mph following approval by the FRA for these higher speeds.

=== Southeast ===
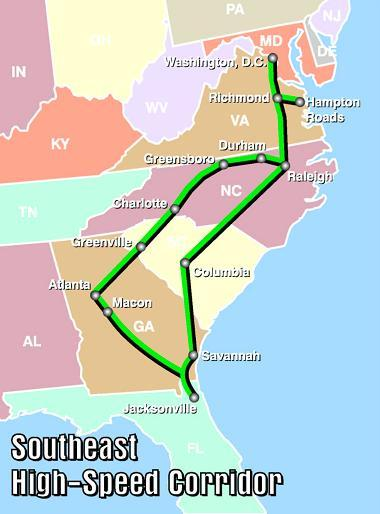
Corridor as designated by the Federal Railroad Administration

The Southeast High-Speed Rail Corridor is a passenger rail transportation project to extend high-speed passenger rail services from Washington, D.C., south through Richmond and Petersburg in Virginia through Raleigh and Charlotte in North Carolina and connect with the existing high-speed rail corridor from DC to Boston, Massachusetts known as the Northeast Corridor. Since first established in 1992, the U.S. Department of Transportation (USDOT) has since extended the corridor to Atlanta and Macon, Georgia; Greenville, South Carolina; Columbia, South Carolina; Jacksonville, Florida; and Birmingham, Alabama.

Incremental rail improvements to existing rail lines have been taking place while the environmental impact study required under the National Environmental Policy Act is being completed. The two-tiered EIS began in 1999, and completion was expected in 2011, with passenger service expected by 2015 to 2020, depending upon funding availability.

==== Atlanta–Charlotte Corridor ====
Another project has been proposed between Atlanta and Charlotte; it is planned to be in service by 2050. The estimated cost to establish a new high-speed corridor between the two cities was between $6.2 billion to $8.4 billion in 2021 when the preferred route, running from Charlotte Gateway Station to Hartsfield-Jackson Atlanta International Airport, was selected.

==== Texas ====
In 1991, the Texas High-Speed Rail Authority awarded a 50-year high-speed rail franchise to the Texas TGV Corporation — a consortium of Morrison-Knudsen (US), Bombardier (Canada), Alstom (France/UK), Crédit Lyonnais (France), Banque IndoSuez (France), Merrill Lynch (USA), and others. Texas TGV won the franchise after more than two years of litigation instigated by a rival consortium backing German ICE technology.

The plan was to connect the "Texas Triangle" (Houston − Dallas/Fort Worth − San Antonio) with a privately financed high-speed train system which would quickly take passengers from one city to the next at prices designed to compete with or beat other transport options. This was the same model Southwest Airlines used 20 years earlier to break into the Texas market where it served the same three cities.

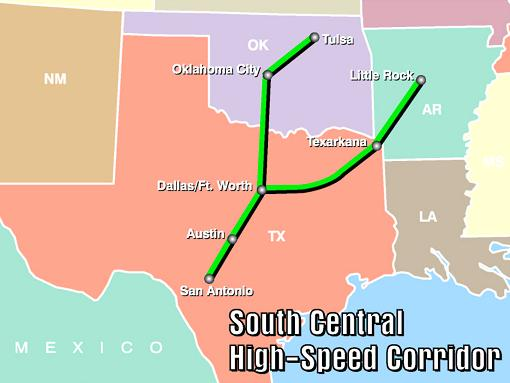
The proposed south central Corridor does not include the Dallas-Houston segment.

Funding for the project was to come entirely from private sources, since Texas did not allow the use of public money. The original estimated cost was $5.6 billion, but the task of securing the necessary private funds proved extremely difficult.

Southwest Airlines, with the help of lobbyists, created legal barriers to prohibit the consortium from moving forward and the entire project was eventually scuttled in 1994, when the State of Texas withdrew the franchise. Several hotel chains like Days Inn, Best Western, and La Quinta Inn, as well as fast food establishments like McDonald's and Burger King lobbied against the plan, primarily because many of their locations were along Interstates and in several highway-dependent rural towns.

Another proposal for high-speed rail in Texas was part of a larger proposed, statewide super-infrastructure, the Trans-Texas Corridor. In 2002, Governor Rick Perry proposed the project, but it was eventually canceled by the legislature in 2009.

In 2002, the Texas High-Speed Rail and Transportation Corporation (THSRTC), a grass roots organization dedicated to bringing high-speed rail to Texas was established. In 2006, American Airlines and Continental Airlines formally joined THSRTC, in an effort to bring high-speed rail to Texas as a passenger collector system for the airlines. The Texas High-Speed Rail and Transportation Corporation developed the Texas T-Bone and Brazos Express corridors to link Central Texas.

In 2010, Texas Department of Transportation (TxDOT) received a federal grant to study a high-speed rail corridor linking Oklahoma City with Dallas–Fort Worth. The state also received another grant in 2011 to start engineering and environmental work on a high-speed link between Houston and Dallas. Another study was being conducted in 2012 by TxDOT on a possible link between Houston and Austin.

While the preliminary work was in progress by TxDOT for the Houston to Dallas line, an unrelated project to build a high-speed railway between the two cities was announced in 2011 by a private company, Lone Star High-Speed Rail. The company was founded in 2009 by U.S. Japan High-Speed Rail to market the use of N700-I bullet train in Texas. In 2012, the company with a new name, Texas Central Railway Company, announced that Central Japan Railway Company signed up to be the primary investor in the project with the total estimated cost of $10 billion to be privately funded. The preliminary engineering, market and financing studies have been started for the service with maximum speed of 205 miles per hour and travel time of 90 minutes. The plan was to seek additional investors in late 2012, start the construction in 2014, and begin the service in 2024.

In 2025, Texas state representative John Bucy introduced House Bill 483, proposing a high-speed rail connection between Dallas, Waco, Austin, and San Antonio along the Interstate 35 corridor. The bill would have required TxDOT to enter into an agreement with a private company to construct and operate the railway, with trains capable of reaching at least 110 miles per hour (180 km/h). It advanced through the House Transportation Committee but did not receive a floor vote.

In 2026, feasibility studies examined passenger rail connections between Austin and San Antonio, including improvements to existing railway infrastructure and a new alignment along State Highway 130 and Interstate 10, with estimated infrastructure costs of up to $1.9 billion and $13.5 billion, respectively. In November 2026, Bucy introduced House Bill 270, reviving the Dallas–San Antonio high-speed rail proposal. The bill would require TxDOT to establish a public-private partnership for the railway and repeal restrictions on state funding for privately operated high-speed rail.

==== Chattanooga–Atlanta Corridor ====
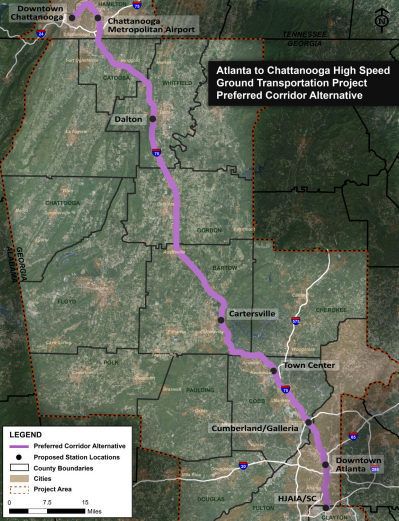
The preferred route for the Atlanta to Chattanooga Rail Corridor.

The Georgia Department of Transportation has completed a Tier 1 Environmental impact assessment on a high speed rail line between Chattanooga and Atlanta, and will move forward with a Tier 2 environmental impact assessment, to be completed by 2030. The system is intended to be a steel-wheel on steel train or a maglev train system.

==== New developments ====
On September 21, 2020, a high-speed train from Houston to Dallas received federal approval. The railroad aims to cut travel time between the two cities to 90 minutes. According to the company in charge of the project, Texas Central Railroad, the Federal Railroad Administration approved construction to begin in early 2021. The company estimates that construction could take up to six years and cost roughly $20 billion.

Engineering and infrastructure development company, AECOM, has emerged as one of the top companies to steer-head the potential project. AECOM recently partnered with technology companies Virgin Hyperloop One and Arrivo to begin consulting with local city and state governments about urban planning. Steven Duong, the head urban planner for AECOM, claimed that cross-state high-speed rail as a system of transportation with both passengers and freight is "reasonable".

=== Midwest ===
==== Illinois and the Midwest ====
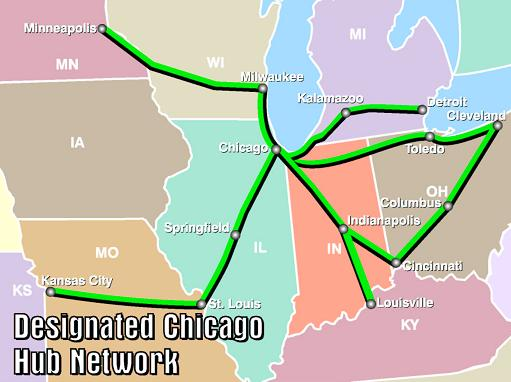
Chicago Hub Network high-speed rail corridors, as designated by the Federal Railroad Administration

The Midwest Regional Rail Initiative or Midwest Regional Rail System (MRRI, MWRRI, or MWRRS) is a plan to implement a 110 to 220 mph (180 to 350 km/h) passenger rail network in the Midwestern United States, using Chicago, Illinois as a hub. Primary routes would stretch across Illinois, Indiana, Michigan, Minnesota, Ohio, and Wisconsin, possibly reaching Kentucky. Secondary routes would operate at a slower speed across Missouri and Iowa, just touching Nebraska and nearly reaching Kansas. With some upgrades already completed, trains regularly travel at 110 mph (180 km/h) for significant distances in Michigan and Illinois.

Construction to provide higher-speed rail services between Chicago and St. Louis was completed in 2023. The Chicago–St. Louis rail line was upgraded so passenger trains are able to reach top speeds of 110 mph (180 km/h) between Alton, Illinois and Joliet, Illinois. Illinois has been one of the most aggressive states in pursuing high-speed rail, receiving $1.1 billion in 2010. The first installment of funds provided for construction between Alton and Lincoln. In March 2011, the next installment of funds ($685 million) provided for another section to go from Lincoln to Dwight. In May 2011, additional funds were allocated for further construction between Dwight and Joliet.

In June 2011, Illinois commenced a study on implementing a 220 mph (350 km/h) service between Chicago and Champaign-Urbana. Legislation passed in 2013 gives the Illinois Tollway the power to build high-speed rail lines. Plans called for eventually investing in true high-speed travel that would boost train speeds to 220 mph (350 km/h).

As a result of upgrades that begin in 2001, trains in Michigan now travel at 110 mph (180 km/h) for 98 mi (158 km) between Porter, Indiana and Kalamazoo, Michigan and for 45 mi (72 km) between Kalamazoo and Albion, Michigan. On May 9, 2011, the state received $196.5 million to extend the higher speed rail upgrades from Kalamazoo an additional 135 mi (217 km) to Dearborn, Michigan. The improvements would reduce the travel time from Chicago to Detroit to roughly 5 hours. Michigan had received more than $161 million for high-speed rail and $40 million for Amtrak stations in Troy, Battle Creek and Dearborn.

About 30 mi (48 km) of the Michigan trains' route passes through a congested area of northwestern Indiana along Lake Michigan's south shore, where trains are regularly delayed by freight traffic. In early 2010 the federal government authorized some $71.4 million for this project.

In Minnesota, there was a proposed high-speed rail service from Rochester to the Twin Cities called Zip Rail. The trains would run on a dedicated track at speeds between 150 and 220 mph (240 and 350 km/h). Zip Rail was proposed to be a public–private partnership with public funding for capital costs and private investment for operations, maintenance and growing ridership. The Zip Rail project was discontinued in 2016.

In July 2021, after Positive Train Control was installed and tested, Amtrak trains (Lincoln Service and Texas Eagle) were allowed to run at 90 mph (140 km/h) on a large part of the Chicago-St. Louis corridor, between Joliet and Alton. As a result, scheduled travel times between Chicago and St. Louis were reduced by about 15 minutes when Amtrak timetables were adjusted in December 2021. Final approval for 110 mph (180 km/h) speeds was granted in May 2023, and higher-speed rail service began on Wednesday, May 3, 2023, reducing travel time by up to an additional 20 minutes.

=== The Southwest ===
The cities of Denver, Las Vegas, Reno, Phoenix and Salt Lake City have formed the Western High Speed Rail Alliance, which is slated to spend $11 million over three years to study the feasibility of building railway links between the major cities of the southwestern United States, as well as linking to the California high-speed corridor via Las Vegas.

In June 2012, the developer of XpressWest, formerly known as DesertXpress, announced that they expanded the planned high-speed rail network to include links to Phoenix, Salt Lake City and Denver. The XpressWest plan was supported by the Western High Speed Rail Alliance.

== Federal high-speed rail initiatives ==
In February 2009, as part of the American Recovery and Reinvestment Act (ARRA), Congress allocated $8 billion to be granted to states for intercity rail projects, with "priority to projects that support the development of intercity high-speed rail service."

=== American Recovery and Reinvestment Act of 2009 ===
==== Strategic plan ====
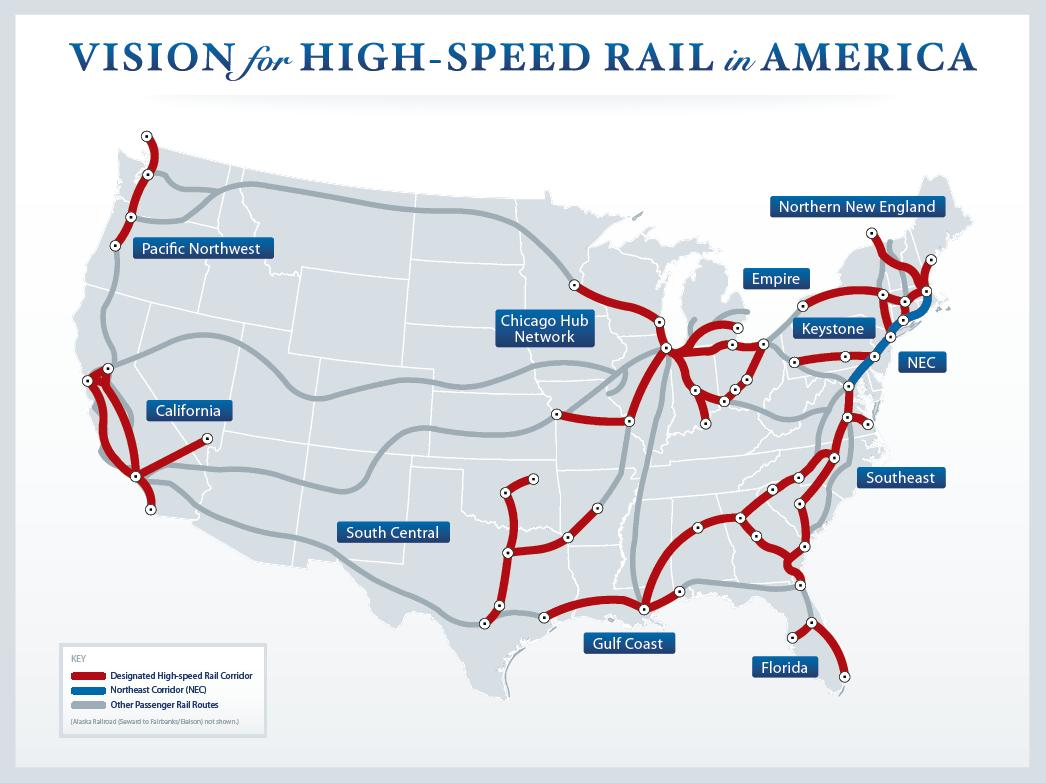
The ten rail corridors identified in 2009 for potential high-speed development, with Chicago being a major hub

In April 2009, as required by ARRA, the FRA released its strategic plan describing the agency's vision for developing high-speed rail in the United States. As potential funding targets, the plan formally identified ten corridors (all previously designated as high-speed rail corridors by several successive Secretaries of Transportation) as well as the Northeast Corridor. The ten designated high-speed corridors, together with the major cities served by each, are:

- Southeast Corridor—Washington, Richmond, Newport News, Norfolk, Raleigh, Durham, Greensboro, Charlotte, Greenville, Atlanta, Columbia, Jacksonville
- California Corridor—Sacramento, San Francisco, San Jose, Fresno, Los Angeles, San Diego, Las Vegas
- Pacific Northwest Corridor—Eugene, Portland, Seattle, Vancouver
- South Central Corridor—Tulsa, Oklahoma City, Dallas/Fort Worth, Austin, San Antonio, Texarkana, and Little Rock
- Gulf Coast Corridor—Houston, New Orleans, Mobile
- Chicago Hub Network—Chicago, Indianapolis, Detroit, Springfield, Cleveland, Toledo, Columbus, Dayton, Cincinnati, Kansas City, St. Louis, Louisville, Milwaukee, Minneapolis/St. Paul
- Florida Corridor—Tampa, Orlando, Miami
- Keystone Corridor—Pittsburgh, Philadelphia, Harrisburg
- Empire Corridor—Buffalo, Rochester, Syracuse, Utica, Schenectady and Albany
- Northern New England Corridor—Boston, Portland/Auburn, Montreal, Springfield, New Haven

In addition to the $8 billion provided by ARRA, the plan predicted an additional $5 billion over 5 years would be made annually available for projects to "jump-start a potential world-class passenger rail system." On June 17, 2009, the FRA advised grant applicants that evaluation for funding would be based on a proposal's potential to make trips quicker and more convenient, reduce congestion on highways and at airports, and meet other environmental, energy, and safety goals.

=== 2009 federal grant funding ===
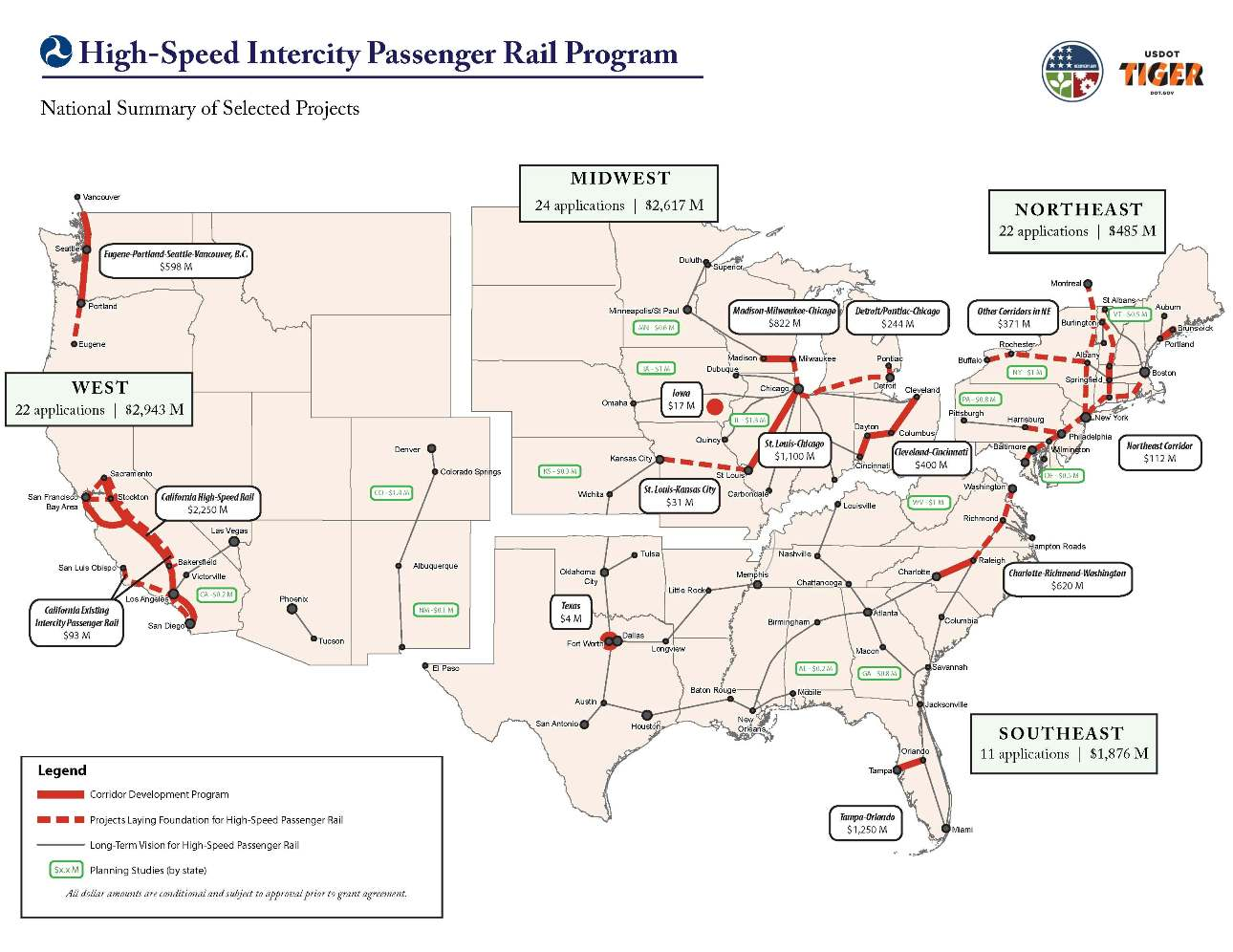
The details of the grants awarded by the ARRA

The FRA received grant applications from states for stimulus funds and FY 2009 intercity capital funds in August and October 2009 Over $57 billion in requests were filed from 34 states and on January 28, 2010, 31 states and 13 rail corridors received funding. The five areas receiving the most funding had originally been designated as high-speed rail corridors in October 1992 following passage of the Intermodal Surface Transportation Efficiency Act of 1991.

Corridor	Grant received (in millions $)
Chicago Hub/Ohio	2617
California	2343
Florida	1250
Southeast	620
Pacific Northwest	598
Northern New England	160
Empire	152
Northeast	112
Keystone	27

=== 2010 allocation ===
Congress allocated $2.5 billion in the FY 2010 budget and these funds were allocated on October 28, 2010. Major allocations are listed below.

Corridor	Grant received (in millions $)
California	898
Florida	800
Chicago Hub	428
Connecticut	121
Southeast	45

==== Cancellation of funds for Wisconsin, Ohio, and Florida ====
On December 10, 2010, Transportation Secretary Ray LaHood announced $1.2 billion in grants for Wisconsin and Ohio would be removed, and redirected to other states. This was due to opposition from governors-elect in both states, Scott Walker of Wisconsin and John Kasich of Ohio. From the redirected funds, California received $624 million, Florida $342 million, Washington $161 million, and Illinois $42 million.

On February 16, 2011, former Florida Governor Rick Scott formally announced that he would be rejecting all federal funds to construct a high-speed railway project in the state, thereby killing the Florida High-Speed Rail project. Governor Scott's reasoning behind canceling the project was that it would be "too costly to taxpayers" and that "the risk far outweigh[ed] the benefits". Those funds were once again redistributed to other states.

==== Attempted Trump cancellation and clawback ====
In May 2019, in retaliation for California's opposition to the Trump border wall, the administration of President Donald Trump attempted to cancel a $929 million grant for California High Speed Rail. This prompted the Trump Administration to threaten to claw back $2.5 billion already granted to CHSR. The state sued, and the issue was resolved in June 2021, when the Biden Administration agreed to restore the grant.

=== 2011 and 2012 proposals and rejections of funding ===
In February 2011, Vice President Biden proposed spending $53 billion on improved passenger rail service over six years. The plan drew fire from majority Republicans in the House of Representatives, who preferred private investment rather than government investment. No money was appropriated for passenger rail in either the FY 2011 or FY 2012 budgets.

=== 2021 Bipartisan Infrastructure Law ===
When Biden became president, he negotiated the bipartisan Infrastructure Investment and Jobs Act in 2021, providing $66 billion to passenger rail projects. High-speed rail grants announced in December 2023:

- $3.07 billion for California High Speed Rail
- $3 billion for Brightline West
- Planning grants for seven high speed rail corridors, including Cascadia High-Speed Rail and the Charlotte-Atlanta segment of the Southeast High Speed Rail Corridor.
- $16.4 billion for 25 projects of national significance along the Northeast Corridor (2023)
- 2 billion in Federal-State Partnership for Intercity Passenger Rail Program funding (2024)
- $63.9 million for the Texas Central Railway

== Appraisal ==
The US rail network has been unfavorably compared to rail networks in Europe, Japan, and especially China, the latter of which built 26000 miles (42000 km) of high-speed rail in the period 2008–2023. As of 2023, it takes more than 6 hours to travel the 450 mi (720 km) from Boston to Washington, DC, while the 800 mi (1,300 km) from Beijing to Shanghai takes 4.5 hours. Rail experts generally conclude that neither the Amtrak Acela nor any other US rail service meets industry-accepted definitions of high speed rail.

The US reluctancy to develop high-speed rail is commonly ascribed to car dependency induced by the highway lobby, a similar dependency on air travel and its lobby, a rail system primarily designed for freight, and an unwillingness for the federal government to subsidize passenger rail in the manner that it subsidizes freeways and air travel. Andy Kunz, the president of the US High Speed Rail Association, noted that in the second half of the 20th century, the US federal government spent trillions of dollars on highways, and less than $10 billion on high-speed rail. While a 2021 federal act granted $66 billion to US passenger rail infrastructure, it simultaneously granted $350 billion to car infrastructure. Through the Buy America Act, federally funded rail projects are also treated as a job protectionism exercise by restricting the use of foreign companies to supply trainsets, tracks, and other parts for high-speed rail systems, even though there may not be any US corporations that are capable of supplying such parts.

The New York Times said "true high-speed rail has not yet made it to the U.S.", with Times architecture critic Michael Kimmelman calling US high-speed rail "nonexistent and terrible". The Times said that even after upgrading trainsets in 2025, Amtrak's Acela service was "not, however, meaningfully faster, and still lags far behind high-speed rail in countries like China, Japan and France, where trains can surpass 200 mph." Commentator Ezra Klein considers the failure to deliver high-speed rail in California to be a case study in the United States' wider inability to build new transit, housing, or other infrastructure due to a "culture of delay".

== See also ==
- High-speed rail in Canada
- Maglev train proposals in the United States
- Rail transportation in the United States
- Turboliner
- UAC TurboTrain
