= Alto (high-speed rail) =

Planned passenger rail network in Canada

Overview
- Service type: High-speed rail
- Status: In planning
- Locale: Greater Toronto Area; Peterborough; National Capital Region; Laval; Montreal; Mauricie; Capitale-Nationale (Quebec)
- First service: Construction (estimate): Starting 2029–2030; Opening (estimate): 2035–2038 (phase 1); 2041–2044 (full)
- Current operator: Cadence consortium (planned)

Route
- Termini: Toronto; Quebec City
- Stops: 7
- Distance travelled: 1,000 km (620 mi)

Technical
- Track gauge: 1,435 mm (4 ft 8 1/2 in)
- Electrification: Overhead line, 25 kV 60 Hz AC
- Operating speed: At least 300 km/h (186 mph)
- Track owner: Government of Canada
- Type: Subsidiary
- Founded: November 29, 2022
- Headquarters: Montreal, Quebec, Canada
- Key people: Martin Imbleau (President & CEO); Robert Prichard (Chairperson); Steven MacKinnon (minister responsible)
- Parent: Via Rail Canada Inc.
- Website: www.altotrain.ca/en

Alto (stylized in all caps) is a planned high-speed rail line in Canada, intended to connect major cities including Toronto, Ottawa, Montreal, and Quebec City. The planning and development of the line is being overseen by a federal Crown corporation operating under the same name (legally VIA HFR – VIA TGF Inc.) which is a wholly owned subsidiary of Via Rail Canada Inc.

Announced by Prime Minister Justin Trudeau on February 19, 2025, Alto (previously Via HFR) will be co-developed by the private consortium Cadence (whose members include Keolis, SNCF, and Air Canada) as part of a design phase that is estimated to cost $3.9 billion and is expected to last six years. The preliminary cost for the network estimated between $60 billion and $90 billion. After co-designing the network with Alto, Cadence will build, finance, operate, and maintain the publicly-owned network.

The railway network will feature trains that will reach top speeds of 300 km/h (190 mph) or more (likely 320 km/h (200 mph)), much greater than that of Via Rail's current fastest services, which have a maximum operating speed of 100 mph (160 km/h) on select sections of track. (Note: Via's Siemens Charger locomotives and Venture cars are capable of 125 mph (200 km/h) speeds but are limited to 100 mph (160 km/h) in service.) The network is planned to consist of approximately 1,000 kilometres (620 mi) of new passenger-dedicated, mainly electrified track, and is expected to begin preliminary construction in 2029, with major construction beginning in 2030. The network will be built in phases, with the first phase from Ottawa and Montreal, with an intermediary station in Laval.

== History ==
=== Background ===
Several studies for Canadian high-speed rail have been created over the decades, but no project advanced to the design phase. The focus area of these studies was the Quebec City–Windsor Corridor, the most densely populated region of Canada. Located in the provinces of Ontario and Quebec, this region is home to approximately half of Canada's population and contains its capital, Ottawa, and its two largest cities, Toronto and Montreal.

In November 2022, the Canadian government announced the planning of a "high-frequency rail" (HFR) line on Via Rail's existing Quebec City–Windsor Corridor. This project was called Via HFR. Via HFR was founded as a Crown corporation on November 29, 2022, under the official company name Via HFR – Via TGF and as a subsidiary of Via Rail, to "oversee what was initially pitched as a 'high frequency' rail project". Its headquarters was chosen to be Montreal and the president and CEO of the Montreal Port Authority Martin Imbleau was later chosen to be its CEO. The High Frequency Rail project would have involved constructing 1000 km of passenger-dedicated electrified track, with trains that travelled at average speeds of up to 200 km/h. The chosen private development partner would have designed, constructed, financed, operated, and maintained the high frequency rail service as well as existing local services.

=== Announcement ===
Alto was officially announced by Prime Minister Justin Trudeau in Montreal on February 19, 2025. It was announced as a revision of the Via HFR project, which was to now be a high-speed rail line from Quebec City to Toronto. The Crown corporation known as Via HFR began operating under the name Alto, and its responsibilities were set as defining the desired project outcomes, performing project management, and co-designing the system. Via Rail was assigned the role of providing advice on the technical and operational aspects of existing passenger railway services in the Quebec City–Windsor Corridor.

The federal government chose the design, construction, financing, operation, and maintenance of the rail network—also named Alto—to be the responsibility of the private Cadence consortium (which includes the French state-owned rail operator SNCF Voyageurs and the private airline Air Canada) after an open bidding process. The Canadian government will retain ownership of the Alto corporation, Via Rail, and all new and existing assets built through the project. In the announcement, Trudeau described the project as the "largest infrastructure project in Canadian history" and added that it would be "a game-changer for Canadians". The line is to span Toronto and Quebec City, with five stops in between: Peterborough, Ottawa, Montreal, Laval, and Trois-Rivières. On June 22, 2026, the federal government announced they would consider adding an additional stop in Kingston.

=== Development ===
Once Cadence was selected as the private development partner (PDP), the Alto project entered the co-development phase. During this phase, the project will move through four pre-construction stages, gradually increasing the level of development. Stage 1 will consist of initial agreement between the PDP and Alto, Stage 2 will include determining the preferred track alignment, Stage 3 will involve developing designs for routes between multiple pairs of cities, and Stage 4 will involve progressing the design of the overall system to 50% completion. The approach of designing route segments between pairs of cities was chosen to reduce the risk of project delays and to enable useful service without needing the entire line to be complete.

On September 14, 2025, an initial list of "nation-building" projects was announced by the federal government, and Alto was not one of them. In an interview, Alto's CEO Martin Imbleau said that he expected that Alto would make it onto a future list of priority projects once development advances further. He reiterated that phased construction is expected to start in 2029 or 2030, with the first of four route segments being completed 6–8 years after construction starts and the entire network being finished in 12–14 years (2041–2044). On December 12, 2025, the federal government announced that the first phase of Alto would be between the cities of Ottawa and Montreal.

== Stations ==
All stations are in the Quebec City–Windsor Corridor.

The Alto high-speed rail network was initially announced to have stops in seven cities. Additional stations are under consideration in Kingston and in the Greater Toronto Area.

Province	City	Metro population (2021)	Rank
Ontario	Toronto	6,202,225	1
Ontario	Peterborough	128,624	32
Ontario	Ottawa	1,488,307	4
Quebec	Montreal	4,291,732	2
Quebec	Laval	4,291,732	2
Quebec	Trois-Rivières	161,489	28
Quebec	Quebec City	839,311	7

== Bidding process ==
=== Participating consortia ===
In July 2023, the government selected three consortia to proceed to the request-for-proposals (RFP) stage for what was then known as the High Frequency Rail project:

==== Cadence (winner) ====
- Caisse de dépôt et placement du Québec (CDPQ Infra) (Canada)
- AtkinsRéalis Group (formerly known as SNC-Lavalin) (Canada)
- SYSTRA Canada (France)
- Keolis Canada (France/Canada)
- Air Canada (Canada)
- SNCF Voyageurs (France)

==== Intercity Rail Developers ====
- Intercity Development Partners (Canada)
- Kilmer Transportation (Canada)
- First Rail Holdings (United Kingdom)
- Jacobs (United States)
- Hatch (Canada)
- CIMA+ (Canada)
- FirstGroup (United Kingdom)
- RATP Dev Canada (France/Canada)
- Renfe Operadora (Spain)
- Meridiam (France)
- DF Canada Infrastructure Group (Canada)
- EllisDon Capital (Canada)

==== Partenaires Ferroviaires Qconnexion Rail Partners ====
- Fengate (Canada)
- John Laing (United Kingdom)
- Bechtel (United States)
- WSP Canada (Canada)
- Deutsche Bahn (Germany)

=== Winning consortium (Cadence) ===
On February 19, 2025, the winning consortium was announced to be Cadence after a multi-year procurement process. Cadence will co-design, build, finance, operate, and maintain the Alto project.

== Travel times ==
Official estimated/planned travel times by Alto and comparison to other modes, including the current Via Rail Quebec City–Windsor Corridor service:

Route	Alto	Via Rail	Driving
Toronto–Ottawa	2:09	~4:30	~4:30
Toronto–Montreal	3:07	5:30	~5:30
Toronto–Peterborough	0:40	—N/a	~1:30
Ottawa–Montreal	0:58	~2:00	~2:00
Montreal–Quebec City	1:29	~3:20	~3:00
Montreal–Trois-Rivières	0:50	—N/a	~1:30

- Current Via Rail trains (Siemens Charger locomotives and Venture cars) have a design top speed of 125 mph (200 km/h) but have a maximum operating speed of 100 mph (160 km/h) due to infrastructure limitations.
- Driving times are based on average conditions and typical routes. Actual travel times may vary depending on traffic, weather, and road conditions.

=== Alto's average speed ===
With the route from Toronto to Montreal via Ottawa being approximately 610 km (380 mi) long, Alto high-speed trains would make the 3 hour 7 minutes trip at an average speed of approximately 196 km/h (122 mph) including stops at stations. For comparison, Amtrak's Acela service operates at an average speed of 132 km/h (82 mph) between New York City and Washington, D.C. (its fastest segment), while in France, SNCF Voyageurs operates the LGV Est, a TGV service at an average speed of 279 km/h (173 mph) between the Reims area and the Metz–Nancy region.

== Benefits ==
By travelling at speeds of up to 320 km/h (200 mph) on dedicated passenger tracks, the Alto high-speed rail project would reduce travel times between Toronto and Montreal to approximately three hours. This lies in the ideal time range to make rail journeys attractive and to allow for frequent trips. Low-cost tickets and frequent service could attract enough passengers for intermediary stations to be built to serve commuters. This could expand access to affordable housing in small towns, while trips between the major cities could remain fast by running non-stop and express service, in response to market demand.

Constructing high-speed rail between Toronto and Quebec City is expected to support up to 51,000 construction jobs over ten years and approximately 5,000 jobs once the line is operational. Alto has described one-time economic impacts from project spending, including up to $86 billion in value added to GDP and up to $23 billion in tax revenue. It has also identified separate benefits for travellers and communities, including time savings, emissions reductions, vehicle cost savings, decongestion, and road safety benefits.

A 2025 C.D. Howe Institute study estimated $15 billion–$27 billion in selected economic benefits over 60 years. The study noted that it was not a full cost-benefit analysis and measured selected economic benefits, rather than all project costs and benefits.

In February 2025, Prime Minister Justin Trudeau stated that the project could boost GDP by up to $35 billion annually. In April 2026, Transport Canada stated that the project could enable productivity benefits that could lift Canada's GDP by up to $35 billion, while fare revenues were projected to exceed $100 billion over the first 40 years of full operations.

The network's use of electrified track will reduce emissions from car and air trips in the Toronto–Quebec City corridor, helping Canada to meet its climate goals. The Government of Canada will require the Cadence consortium to deliver minimum project outcomes, including "producing a significant modal shift to passenger rail; providing barrier-free access to services according to the latest accessibility standards; and improved on-time performance across the Corridor." Additionally, the entry of high-speed rail into regional transportation markets typically results in improved on-time flight performance, service quality, and price competition.

== Criticism ==
The project's public-private partnership (P3) structure has been criticized for increasing the risk of project difficulties and reducing the potential benefits of the proposed high-speed line, compared to a line fully owned and operated by a public entity. A private operator could increase ticket prices to maximize profitability, which would limit the number of travellers switching from driving and air travel to rail travel. The private consortium may also be incentivized to reduce labour costs by terminating obstructive union agreements when they come up for renewal, and any changes in Alto's schedules, stations, or routes would have to be negotiated with the private consortium, potentially resulting in costly litigation. With many high-speed rail lines requiring additional government subsidy, some fear that this project may result in another financial burden to taxpayers and subject to government funding cuts in the future similar to the 1980s cuts to Via Rail. In response to these criticisms, the CEO of Alto Martin Imbleau said that Alto would generate net-positive revenue and require zero subsidies.

Ryan Katz-Rosene, an associate professor in political studies at the University of Ottawa whose research includes ecological political economy and environmental policy, argued in The Conversation that the project may have a limited effect on Canada's total national greenhouse gas emissions, rather than assessing its effect only within intercity passenger transportation. Other sources emphasize potential emissions reductions within the intercity transportation sector through modal shifts from car and air travel to electrified rail. The project remains in the co-development phase, with environmental impacts subject to further study through ongoing field work, consultations, and federal impact assessment processes.

Transport Action Canada raised concerns about Air Canada's participation in the Cadence consortium, arguing that its role as an airline operating in the same corridor could present a potential conflict of interest. Air Canada stated that its participation was intended to support integration between the future intercity rail network and existing airport hubs in the Quebec–Windsor corridor.

The rail advocacy organization Transport Action Canada compared the estimated travel time of 3 hours 7 minutes between Toronto and Montreal at an average speed of 196 km/h to an earlier study done by Via Rail, which estimated a Toronto–Montreal trip time of 2 hours 15 minutes and corresponding average speed of 271 km/h (assuming a maximum speed of 350 km/h). They noted that Alto's cost estimates are more than double the average per-kilometre cost for high-speed rail construction in Europe, which has itself been found to be excessive by the European Court of Auditors.

Wildlife Preservation Canada expressed deep concern about the negative impacts this project could have on the many wildlife species that inhabit the region of the proposed routes. One of the proposed Alto routes is of particular concern as it would run through a globally rare alvar grassland habitat—the Napanee Limestone Plain—that is home to an endangered species on the brink of extinction in Canada: the eastern loggerhead shrike.

On March 31, 2026, Conservative Party leader Pierre Poilievre called for the cancellation of the Alto project, describing it as a "boondoggle" and citing concerns about costs, land use, and potential expropriation of property.

Opposition also emerged in some communities, with landowners concerned about impacts to their properties and to the local environment. On September 19, 2026, a rally was held in Rigaud, Quebec, in opposition to the Alto rail project, as farmers and community members voiced their concerns. Alto said that no final route had been selected and that it was undertaking studies and consultations to identify and mitigate potential impacts where possible.
