= High-speed rail in Canada =

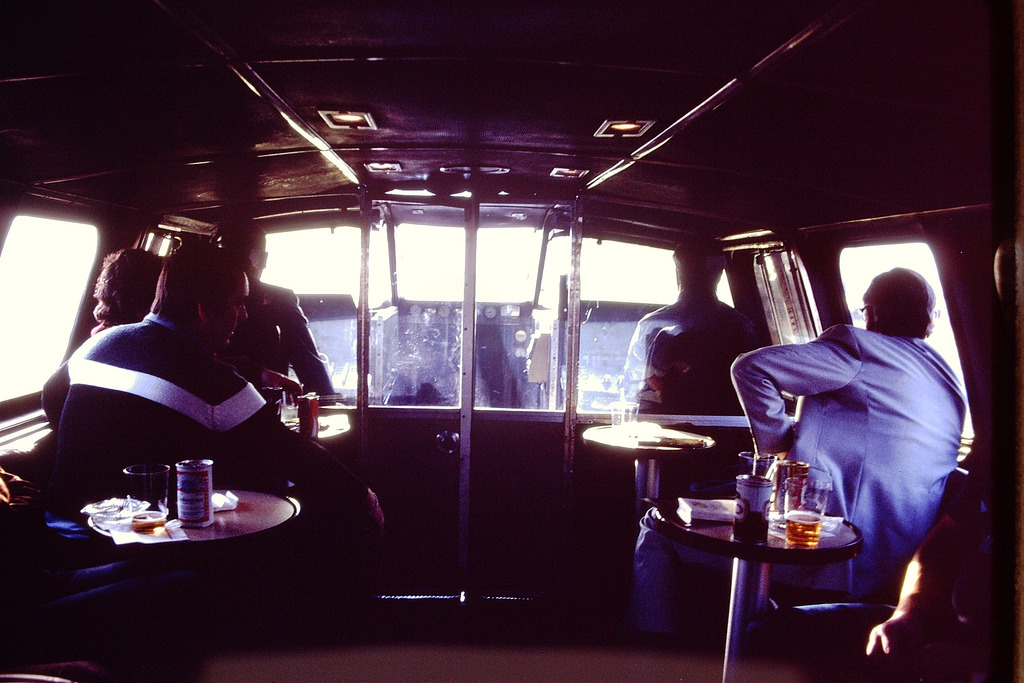
TurboTrain – Canada's only high speed train. It achieved the speed of 226 km/h in a speed run in 1976.

Several plans have been proposed for high-speed rail in Canada, the only G7 country that does not have any high-speed/higher-speed rail lines. In the press and popular discussion, there have been two routes frequently proposed as suitable for a high-speed rail corridor: Edmonton to Calgary via Red Deer and Windsor to Quebec City via London, Kitchener-Waterloo, Toronto, Ottawa and Montreal.

Other proposed routes include international high-speed rail links between Montreal and Boston or New York City discussed by regional leaders, though little progress has been made. On April 10, 2008, an advocacy group, High Speed Rail Canada, was formed to promote and educate Canadians on the benefits of high-speed rail in Canada.

On February 19, 2025, the government announced a high-speed rail project in the Toronto–Quebec City corridor with speeds up to 300 to 350 km/h (186 to 217 mph). The name of this service will be Alto.

== Early high-speed rail in Canada ==
CN Rail created an initial high-speed rail project with the UAC TurboTrain, in its Toronto–Montreal route during the 1960s. The TurboTrain achieved speeds as high as 201 km/h (125 mph) in regular service. The Turbo went 225 km/h (140 mph) in a speed run April 26, 1976, and may have attained even higher speeds in test runs in 1968–1969.

CN's, and later Via Rail's, TurboTrain service was marred with lengthy interruptions to address design problems and having to cope with poor track quality (accounted for by dual passenger-freight use). As such, the trains were operated at 161 km/h (100 mph). The TurboTrain featured the latest technology advances such as passive coach tilting, Talgo attachment for rigid coach articulation, and gas-turbine power. The units were plagued by technical and reliability issues and were ultimately retired by 1982.

Beginning in the 1970s, a consortium of several companies started to study Bombardier Transportation's LRC, which was a more conventional approach to high-speed rail, in having separate cars and locomotives, rather than being an articulated train. Pulled by heavy conventional-technology diesel-electric locomotives designed for 201 km/h (125 mph) normal operating speed, it entered full-scale service in 1981 for Via Rail, linking cities in the Quebec City–Windsor corridor, but at speeds never exceeding the 161 km/h (100 mph) limit mandated by line signaling. It was the world's first active tilting train in commercial service.

== Calgary–Edmonton ==
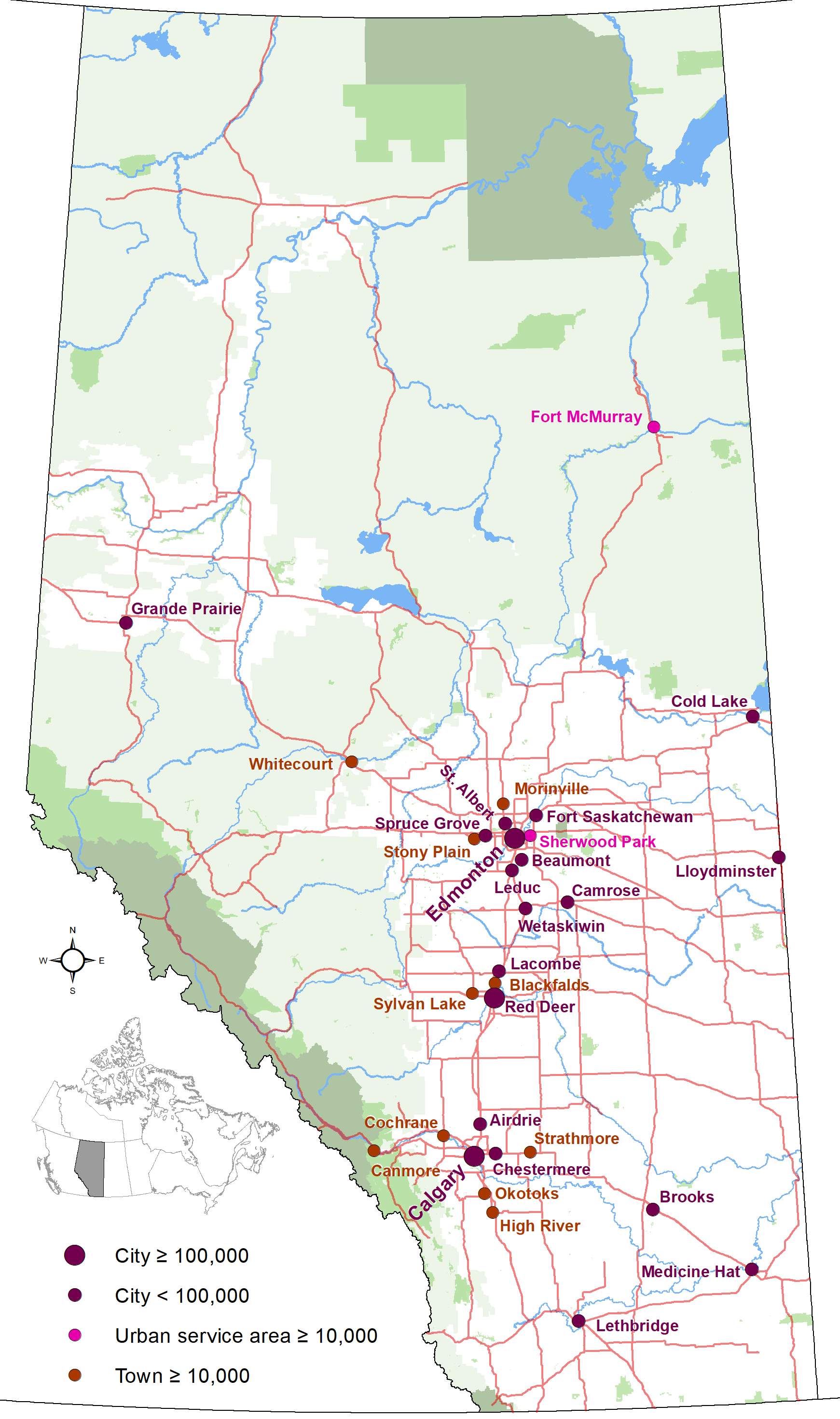
Map of Alberta showing the linear concentration of cities between Calgary and Edmonton.

The Calgary–Edmonton corridor is about 300 km (190 mi) long and takes about three hours to traverse by car via the Queen Elizabeth II Highway.

=== 2004 Van Horne Institute study ===
A 2011 update to a 2004 study by the Van Horne Institute concluded that "high-speed rail would bring significant benefits to the Calgary–Edmonton corridor and Alberta as a whole". The report also stated that the project would "generate between $3.7 and $6.1 billion in quantifiable benefits". The study considered three options:

1. Upgrade of an existing Canadian Pacific freight route to allow trains up to 240 km/h (150 mph) using Bombardier's JetTrain, costing approximately $2.5 billion.
2. A new dedicated passenger route, known as the "Green Field" route, also using the JetTrain, and costing approximately $3.7 billion.
3. An electrified version of the Green Field route, using TGV-style trains running at 300 km/h (190 mph), costing approximately $5 billion.

The report also found that there was little incremental benefit in running at 300 km/h (190 mph) rather than 240 km/h (150 mph), and therefore recommended the first option.

On September 22, 2006, the government of Alberta announced that it was deploying video cameras along a stretch of the Queen Elizabeth II Highway to measure the number of cars that travel between the two cities.

The Calgary Herald reported on April 18, 2007, that the provincial government had purchased land in downtown Calgary for a possible station or terminal. On April 7, 2011, Premier Ed Stelmach said that the land being purchased for the new location of the Royal Alberta Museum could be used as the Edmonton terminal.

=== Government plans ===
In 2011, Alberta Premier Alison Redford said that the high-speed rail was a priority for her, saying "such an initiative could unite the province and send a message to Canada and the world about Alberta's progress." However, during the 2012 Alberta provincial election campaign, none of the four main party leaders said that they denied the need for one, but said that it was a "maybe".

The Standing Committee on Alberta's Economic Future studied the feasibility of high-speed rail between Calgary and Edmonton in 2014. The committee also held hearings on the subject in early 2014 in Calgary, Red Deer and Edmonton. The report released in May 2014 stated that although Alberta was not ready for high-speed rail, the government should start planning for it by acquiring land along a transportation corridor.

In 2015, the provincial New Democratic Party government stated it was reviving the possibility of a bullet train operating between Edmonton and Calgary. The Minister of Infrastructure, Brian Mason, said the government had issued a request for a proposal to plan and implement a study "to determine the future needs for the QE II highway" due to high traffic volumes. "The high-speed train between Edmonton and Calgary is something that we're beginning to ask about," said Mason. The line would cost between $2.6 and $7 billion depending on the type of technology used. Annual operating costs of a high-speed rail line were estimated to be anywhere from $88 million to $129 million. Via Rail stated that such projects 'pay for themselves.' and that the government should invest more in the Canadian rail industry. The Liberal government of Canada also endorsed and prioritized investing heavily in national and provincial infrastructure projects.

In April 2024, the United Conservative Party government announced a Passenger Rail Master Plan to assess the feasibility of a province-wide passenger rail network that could include high-speed rail services between Calgary and Edmonton. The master plan and its associated plan for delivery of services over a 15-year period were expected to be completed by summer 2025.

=== Prairie Link ===
On July 8, 2021, EllisDon formed a partnership with AECOM to plan a high-speed rail line between Calgary and Edmonton, running through Red Deer. The group formed by the partnership is named Prairie Link. EllisDon estimated the project would cost $9 billion. The project was to be entirely financed by the private sector. The memorandum of understanding (MOU) that was signed with Alberta had no financial commitment from the government. The director of Prairie Link, Jeffrey Hansen-Carlson, said that "The MOU essentially sets the stage for a cooperative relationship between Prairie Link and the government to support project development." Prairie Link also emphasized that regulatory issues would also be discussed with the government since there is little regulation for high-speed rail in Alberta.

As of 2021, the project was in the planning and development phase. Construction was projected to begin in 2023 and last 7–9 years. The trains would have been capable of reaching speeds of 350–400 km/h (220–250 mph), well over the 250 km/h (160 mph) threshold needed for newly built lines to qualify as high-speed under the general definition of the term.

=== 2026 Alberta Passenger Rail Master Plan ===
On June 5, 2026, the provincial government released its Passenger Rail Master Plan, which provided an updated goal to build greenfield high-speed rail targeting 320 km/h between downtown Edmonton and downtown Calgary via Red Deer, with possibly additional stops at the cities' international airports.

== Quebec City–Windsor ==
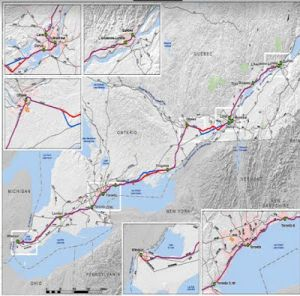
2011 Windsor–Quebec City High-Speed Rail Map – EcoTrans

The Quebec City–Windsor corridor is the most densely populated and heavily industrialized region of Canada. With over 18 million people, it contains approximately half of Canada's population, the national capital, and three of the four largest metropolitan areas in Canada (Toronto, Montreal and Ottawa). It is already the focus of most Via Rail service. As of 2025, 28 studies have been completed on the idea of high-speed rail in the Ontario-Quebec Corridor. In early 2025, a private consortium was awarded a contract to co-design the Alto high-speed rail line between Toronto and Quebec, with funding to build the line to be committed at a later date.

=== 1995 study ===
This study was initiated in 1992. The scope included "medium-fast" (200–250 km/h) and very fast (more than 300 km/h) technologies. It produced three reports: Quebec-Ontario High Speed Rail Project, Preliminary Routing Assessment and Costing Study, Final Report and Québec-Ontario High Speed Rail Project, Final Report.

=== Lynx consortium ===
In 1998, the Lynx consortium, including Bombardier and SNC-Lavalin proposed a 320 km/h (200 mph) high-speed train from Toronto to Quebec City via Kingston, Ottawa and Montreal based on the TGV and the French Turbo-Train technology.

=== Bombardier JetTrain ===
In 2000, Bombardier developed the JetTrain. The high-speed train prototype generates its power to turn the wheels with a 5,000-horsepower (3.7 MW) Pratt and Whitney turbine. The Jet Train visited Calgary and Toronto in March 2003. The prototype then visited Miami on 7 October 2003 and Orlando on the 11th. After these promotional stops in the United States and Canada, no government purchased the Jet Train. The prototype is stored serviceable in Pueblo, Colorado, United States.

=== 2008 study ===
On January 10, 2008, Dalton McGuinty (Premier of Ontario), and Jean Charest (Premier of Quebec) announced their two provinces would conduct a joint $2 million feasibility study into the development of high-speed rail in the Quebec City–Windsor Corridor. The federal government agreed to participate in the study. In February 2009, The EcoTrain Consortium, consisting of firms Dessau, MMM Group, KPMG, Wilbur Smith & Associates and Deutsche Bahn, were awarded a contract to update the feasibility studies for high-speed rail (HSR) in the Quebec City–Windsor corridor. The study was expected to take a year, but was delayed. Michael Ignatieff, leader of the Liberal Party, said in 2011 that he would agree to fund the Quebec corridor and described it as a means to unite the country, similar to early railway projects in Canada. His NDP counterpart, Jack Layton, also pledged to fund the route.

When the results of the study were released October 17, 2011, by the citizens group High Speed Rail Canada, it revealed results for two technology alternatives: diesel traction and electric traction. Diesel traction would provide speeds of 200 km/h and would cost $18.9 billion for an entire Windsor–Quebec City system; a Montreal–Ottawa–Toronto system would cost $9.1 billion. Electric traction would provide speeds of 300 km/h and would cost $21.3 billion for an entire Windsor–Quebec City system; a Montreal–Ottawa–Toronto system would cost $11 billion. The study further revealed that a Montreal–Ottawa–Toronto system is the most economically viable section and could generate a net economic benefit using either diesel or electric traction.

After the report had been released, politicians and Chamber in Windsor area argued that having the less-expensive "higher speed rail" connection between Detroit and Windsor must be part of the consideration. Detroit is already part of higher speed rail initiative in the United States to connect to Chicago and to St. Louis. They suggested that a study to include cross-border connection would account for greater economic impact.

=== Developments after 2014 ===
In an interview with CBC Radio on April 15, 2014, ahead of the 2014 Ontario general election, Ontario Minister of Transportation Glen Murray announced that high-speed rail would be constructed between London, Kitchener, and Toronto within 10 years. Murray released further details on April 30. Select results from a study prepared by a consultancy based in London, England, First Class Partnerships, was released to the public. The FCP study considered options including continuing the existing service with LRC trains, incremental upgrading of the existing line with faster and more diesels, and construction of new sections of line. However the full FCP study was not publicly released.

In an interview with 'International Rail Journal' on May 2, 2014, FCP disclosed a few further details. Unlike the earlier EcoTrain study, which proposed to build a completely separate line for HSR, FCP proposed to share the existing rail corridor from Toronto to Georgetown, which is being upgraded with 4 to 6 tracks and will be electrified for use by GO regional trains and Toronto's Union Pearson Express. In addition the FCP noted substantial traffic potential for an HSR line between Kitchener/Waterloo and Toronto. This contrasts with EcoTrain, which dismissed that corridor as being too short a trip to be attractive for HSR. FCP also noted the route from Kitchener to London would be across "open countryside" and reduce land acquisition issues. Murray said that next step was to prepare an environmental impact statement, and that the line might be implemented within 8 years. The project faced significant technical and political challenges. HSR trains would have needed to share tracks with GO regional, freight, and airport express trains. Between Bramalea and Georgetown, HSR trains would have shared the corridor with the CN's main line.

In October 2014, High Speed Rail Canada announced that it would release to the public a number of feasibility studies done on the corridor. One was the FCP study of a line between London and Toronto, and the other was a study by the SNCF and funded by cities along the Quebec–Windsor Corridor for an HSR line between Windsor and Quebec City.

=== High-speed rail within Ontario ===
On December 5, 2014, the Ontario Ministry of Transportation approved starting an environmental assessment on the best route for a high speed rail connecting Toronto, Kitchener–Waterloo, London and Windsor for 2015. On October 30, 2015, the Government of Ontario announced that David Collenette would be the special advisor for high-speed rail. Collenette delivered the Special Advisor's Final Report to the provincial government on December 2, 2016,

On May 19, 2017, Ontario Premier Kathleen Wynne and Transport Minister Steven Del Duca announced the first steps in having a high-speed rail route in place by 2025 from Toronto to London, extending to Windsor by 2031, based on the recommendations on Collenette's report. The environmental assessment for this would be coordinated with the Metrolinx project to enable two-way, all-day GO Transit trains to Kitchener and would share that corridor. Wynne also said that design and planning would commence "immediately" along with the assessment. The announcement was criticized as a re-election tactic for the 2018 Ontario general election, as the Liberal Party had announced similar plans for high-speed rail in 2014, also ahead of a general election that year. However, with the election of a majority government for the Progressive Conservative Party of Ontario, the future of the high-speed rail proposal inherited from the Liberal Party became uncertain. In late 2018, it was reported that the new Ford government, while not outright cancelling the high-speed rail proposal, was expanding its scope to include alternatives such as increased Via Rail service, more bus capacity or improved highway infrastructure. The 2019 provincial budget paused all funding for the high-speed rail proposal.

=== Via HFR ===
On July 6, 2021, procurement for the Via Rail's high-frequency rail (HFR) service, called Via HFR, was announced. The service was planned to operate between Toronto and Quebec City partly along new tracks that would run through Peterborough, Ottawa, Montreal, Laval, and Trois-Rivières, and partly along existing right of way. The government's initial announcement envisioned trains operating at a maximum speed 200 km/h (125 mph), but the government challenged its partners to come up with a design that could reach speeds up to 300 km/h (186 mph). By segregating Via's passenger rail services from freight lines, travel times in some routes were expected to be reduced by up to 90 minutes, and service reliability was expected to increase from an average of 67% to 95%. The project ultimately evolved into the Alto project.

=== Alto (high-speed rail) ===
On October 28, 2024, it was confirmed that Via HFR would be built as high-speed rail, with fully grade-separated trains travelling up to 300 km/h (186 mph). The winning bid was expected to be announced a few weeks later, with design of the system expected to take approximately four years. The selected consortium, named Cadence, includes companies such as SNCF, Air Canada, SYSTRA Canada, Keolis Canada, AtkinsRéalis, and CDPQ Infra. $3.9 billion were pledged for the design phase of the project, after which construction is expected to begin.

On February 19, 2025, Prime Minister Justin Trudeau announced that the Cadence project was being changed to a fully electric high-speed rail line from Toronto to Quebec City. The approximately 1,000-kilometre (620 mi) corridor project was named Alto, which is also the new brand name of Via Rail's subsidiary, formerly known as High Frequency Rail. The Cadence consortium, along with the Crown corporation, is collaborating to design, finance, operate, and maintain the project.

== Other proposed routes ==
=== Toronto Pearson-Oshawa ===
If built mainly along the Highway 407 corridor, this project could become a key segment of a GTA orbital rail line linking major suburban hubs. With a four-station route, a high-speed or fast regional rail line connecting: Toronto Pearson International Airport →Vaughan Metropolitan Centre → Richmond Hill Centre → Oshawa. Transportation planners often see this northern corridor as one of the most strategically valuable transit routes in the region.

=== Chilliwack–Whistler ===
In October 2020, a group known as the Mountain Valley Express Collective Society formed to propose the creation of a high-speed rail network for the Fraser Valley. The rail network was proposed as an alternative to supplement the growing capacity demands along the British Columbia Highway 99 corridor. The proposal was for an end-to-end transit system running from Whistler to Chilliwack, with stops in major municipalities like Surrey, Vancouver, and Squamish. The BC provincial government did not formally approach the project.

=== Vancouver–Seattle ===
The Pacific Northwest Corridor is one of ten high-speed rail corridors proposed by the US federal government. If the 750 km (466 mi) corridor were completed as proposed, 180 km/h (110 mph) passenger trains would travel from Eugene, Oregon, to Seattle, Washington, in 2 hours 30 minutes, and from Seattle to Surrey, British Columbia, in 2 hours 50 minutes. A dedicated line parallel to existing tracks would decrease this time into 1 hour, with 400 km/h (250 mph) speed. As of 2020, the proposal was still being worked on.

The terminus on the Canadian side was proposed for King George station in Surrey. This would leave passengers at the end of a public transit SkyTrain line to downtown Vancouver, a 40-minute addition to the trip. Surrey is east of Vancouver.

A second option is to run the line to Bridgeport in Richmond. That is a 20-minute ride on SkyTrain to downtown Vancouver.

The State of Washington completed in December 2020 an ultra-high-speed study titled, "Cascadia High Speed Ground Transportation". The Cascadia ultra-high-speed ground transportation (UHSGT) system would connect people and communities increase economic competitiveness, and improve quality of life across the Cascadia megaregion. This fast, safe predictable way to travel would connect the metro areas of Vancouver, Seattle, and Portland.

=== Montreal–Boston/New York ===
In 2000, the United States Federal Railroad Administration proposed an accelerated line running at speeds of 200 km/h (124 mph) between Boston and Montreal to link with the Acela Express and Northeast Regional service from Washington, D.C., to Boston and to serve northern New England communities along the route. The first phase of the study, which included public hearings, was conducted in 2002 with the participation of the states of Massachusetts, New Hampshire, and Vermont. The second phase of the study was cancelled after New Hampshire withdrew its support.

In the 1970s, the Mayor of Montreal, Jean Drapeau, announced his project to build a TGV (high-speed line) to New York to replace the slow and unreliable Adirondack service operated by Amtrak. In 2001, Mayor Pierre Bourque tried to revive the TGV to New York project. The topic was also discussed between the governor of New York and the premier of Quebec, but no progress was made after a pre-feasibility study in 2003. The line is problematic because most of the investment would need to be made through the sparsely populated Adirondack Mountains north of Albany. Between Albany and New York, relatively fast and frequent rail service is already available.

== See also ==
- Proposed high-speed rail by country
