= Pikeland Township =

Pikeland Township may refer to:

- East Pikeland Township, Chester County, Pennsylvania
- West Pikeland Township, Pennsylvania
