= Chester Springs, Pennsylvania =

Unincorporated community in Pennsylvania, US

Chester Springs
- Unincorporated community
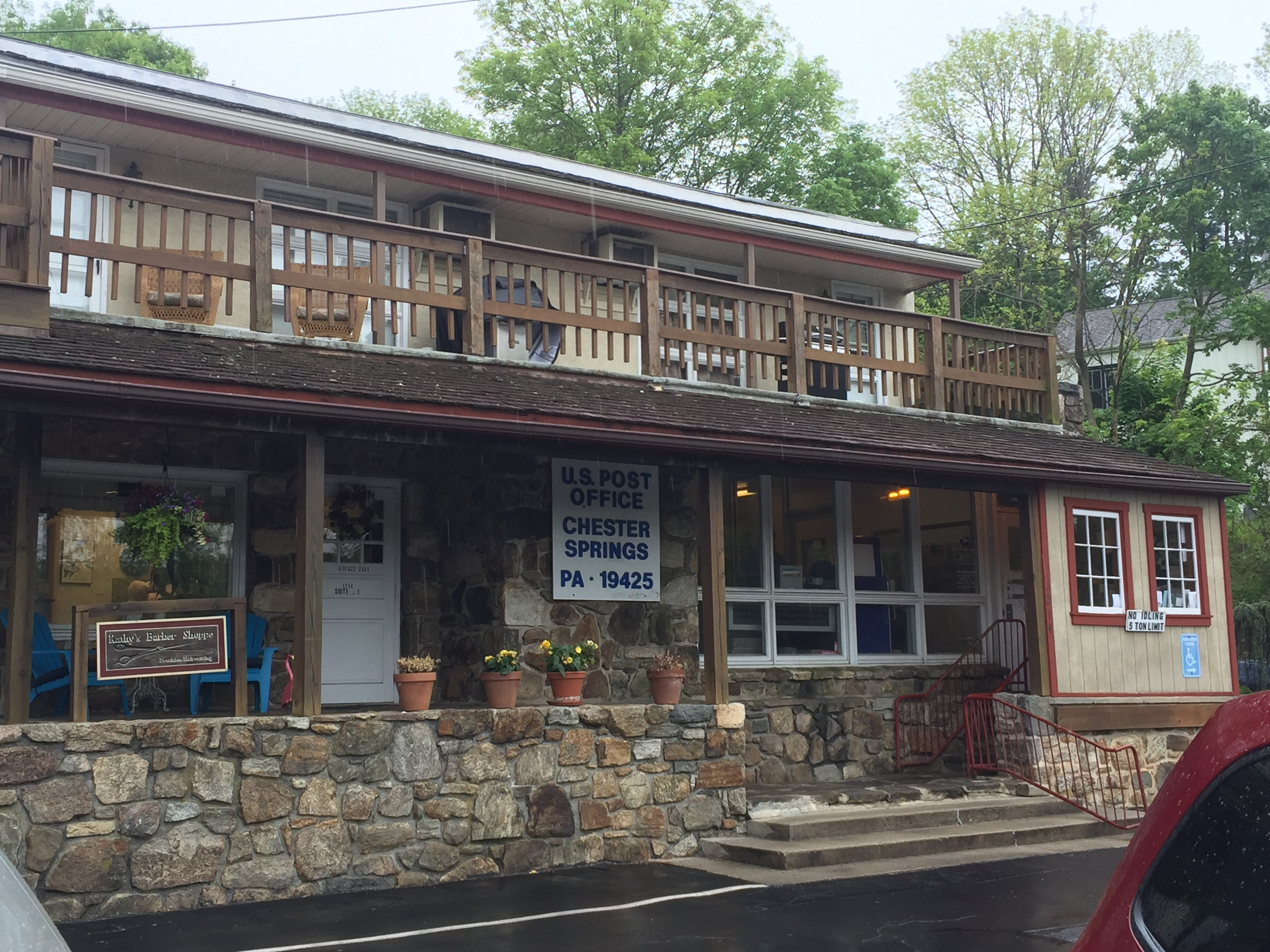
- Chester Springs' post office on PA Route 113

- Location of Chester Springs in Pennsylvania Chester Springs (the United States)
- Coordinates: 40°05′42″N 75°37′01″W
- Country: United States
- State: Pennsylvania
- County: Chester
- Township: West Pikeland
- Elevation: 256 ft (78 m)
- Time zone: UTC-5 (EST)
  - Summer (DST): UTC-4 (EDT)
- ZIP Code: 19425
- Area code: 610

Pennsylvania Historical Marker
- Designated: May 13, 1948

Chester Springs is an unincorporated community in Chester County, Pennsylvania, United States. It is centered on West Pikeland Township, and extends into Charlestown Township, Upper Uwchlan Township, Wallace Township, East Nantmeal Township, and West Vincent Township. The Chester Springs Historic District is located in Chester Springs.

== Demographics ==
Chester Springs is not a census-designated place; the postal zone is considerably larger than the village. As of the 2000 census, the population of ZIP Code Tabulation Area (ZCTA) 19425 was 7,520. According to the 2020–2024 American Community Survey 5-year estimates, ZCTA 19425 had a population of 17,219.

== Arts and culture ==
The Historic Yellow Springs Village is located in Chester Springs. The community includes historic churches, established in the 1770s by German Reformed and Lutheran members. These include two facilities on Clover Mill Road: St. Peter's United Church of Christ, whose current building was constructed in 1835, had its first worship place built by its early German Reformed congregation in 1772. St. Peter's Evangelical Lutheran Church was planted by Heinrich Melchior Muhlenberg. Chester Springs is also home to The Mill at Anselma (Lightfoot Mill), a National Historic Landmark grain mill built in 1747. The Mill at Anselma is considered the best-preserved example of a grain mill of its kind in the country, boasting its original wooden gearing system and millstones. It is fully functional today and continues to mill flour and cornmeal for sale. The historic Larkin Covered Bridge, built in 1881, is located near the village of Eagle.

== Education ==
Chester Springs principally lies within the Downingtown Area School District. Some areas of Chester Springs are in the Downingtown Area School District, Great Valley School District, Phoenixville Area School District, and Owen J. Roberts School District. The Chester Springs post office is located on Pennsylvania Route 113 near the heart of the village.

Chester Springs is also home to Montgomery School, a preschool through 8th grade independent school.

== Notable people ==
- Matt Campanale, professional hockey player
- Henry Ruhl Guss (1825–1907), Union Army brevet major general
- Jillian Jacqueline, country music singer
- Max Tullman, racing driver
