= Yellow Springs =

Yellow Springs or Yellow Spring could refer to:

== Places ==
- Yellow Springs, Ohio
- Yellow Springs, Blair County, Pennsylvania
- Yellow Springs, Chester County, Pennsylvania
- Yellow Spring, West Virginia

== In mythology ==
- Diyu, the Chinese underworld
- Yomi, the Japanese underworld
