= Yellow Springs, Pennsylvania =

There are several places named Yellow Springs in the U.S. state of Pennsylvania, including:

- Yellow Springs, Blair County, Pennsylvania
- Yellow Springs, Chester County, Pennsylvania
