= Middle Pickering Rural Historic District =

Historic district in Pennsylvania, United States

- U.S. National Register of Historic Places
- U.S. Historic district
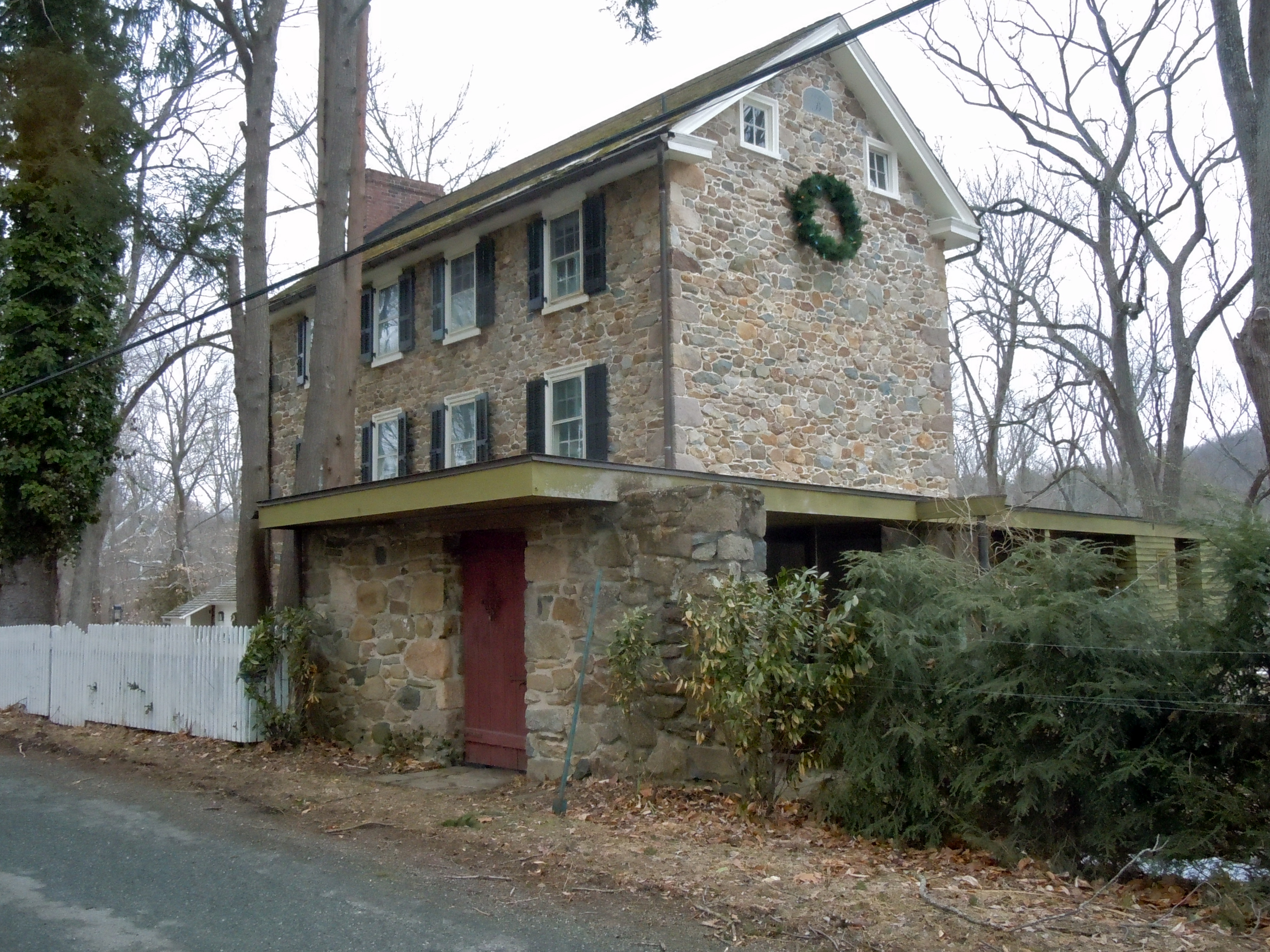
- House in the Middle Pickering Rural Historic District, February 2011

- Location within Pennsylvania Location within the United States
- Location: Pikeland, Yellow Springs, Merlin, Church, and Pickering Roads, Charlestown Township, East Pikeland Township, and West Pikeland Township, Pennsylvania
- Coordinates: 40°05′40″N 75°34′38″W
- Area: 1,055 acres (427 ha)
- Architectural style: International Style, Vernacular farmhouse
- NRHP reference No.: 91001125
- Added to NRHP: September 6, 1991

The Middle Pickering Rural Historic District also known as the Pickering & Pigeon Run Rural Historic District, is a national historic district that is located in Charlestown Township, East Pikeland Township, and West Pikeland Township, Chester County, Pennsylvania.

It was listed on the National Register of Historic Places in 1991.

== History and architectural features ==
Adjacent to the Charlestown Village Historic District, the Middle Pickering Rural Historic District encompasses seventy-six contributing buildings, five contributing sites, and fifteen contributing structures that are located in rural northern Chester County. Included in this district are farmsteads that date to the eighteenth or nineteenth centuries, two Lutheran churches and cemeteries, the sites of two small industrial complexes, and the village of Merlin. Also located in the district but listed separately is the Oskar G. Stonorov House.

== Pickering Creek Bridge ==
Built in 1894 by John Denithorne and Sons of Phoenixville, Pennsylvania. It is a metal 6 Panel Pin-Connected Pratt Full-Slope Pony Truss, measuring roughly 80' long and 14' wide. The bridge was rehabilitated in 1999, whereby the original historic truss bridge was technically replaced with a steel stringer bridge. The truss webs were attached to this replacement bridge as decorations. The wooden roadway slats were retained or replaced with period-appropriate material--a rarity for bridge renovations; however, the replacement of this bridge resulted in a loss of what may have been the unique variety of fishbelly floorbeam.

The bridge was added to the National Register of Historic Places as a contributing artifact in 1991.

== Gallery ==
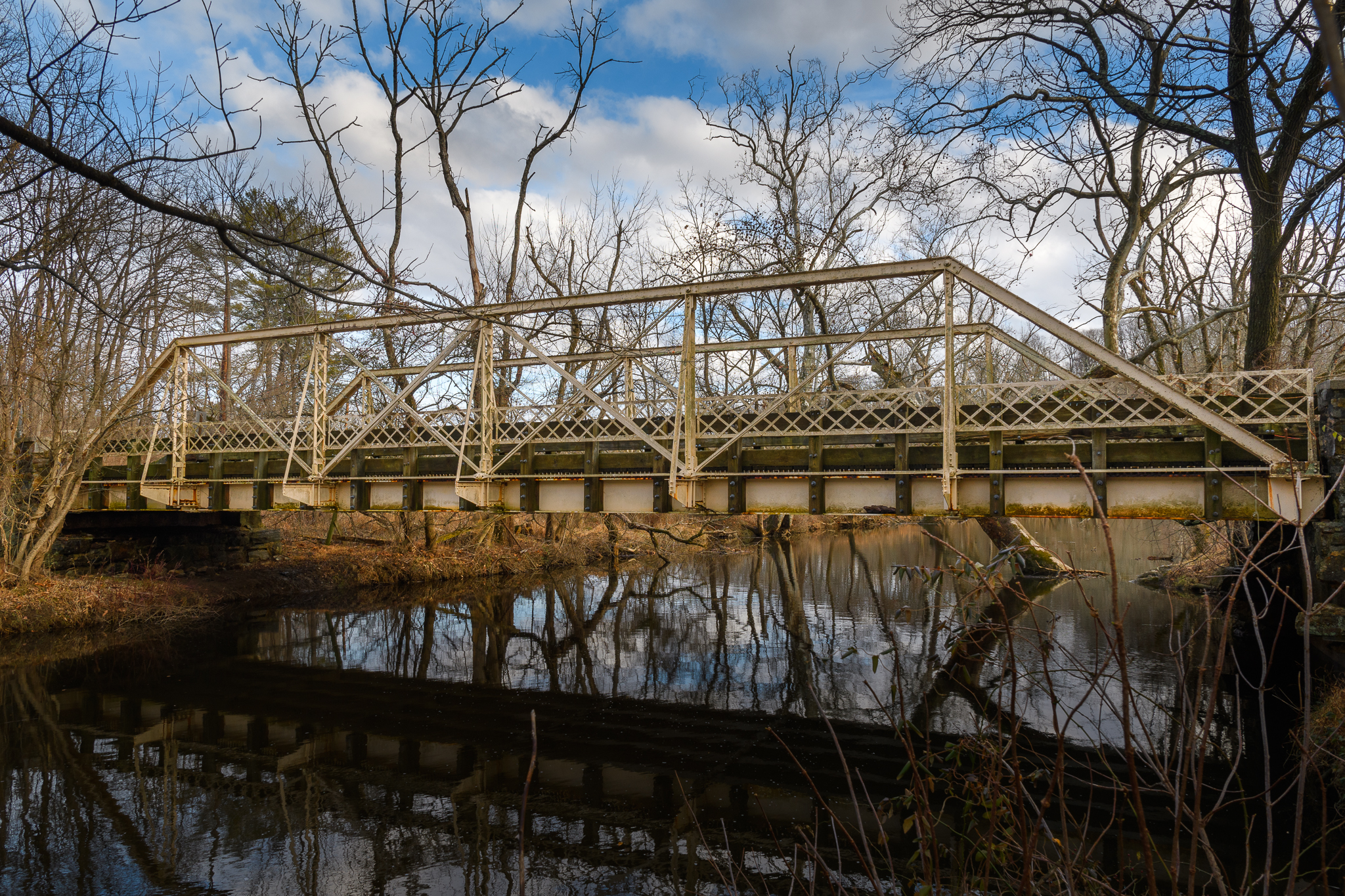
View of bridge from NW vantage. Bridge was rehabbed in 1999

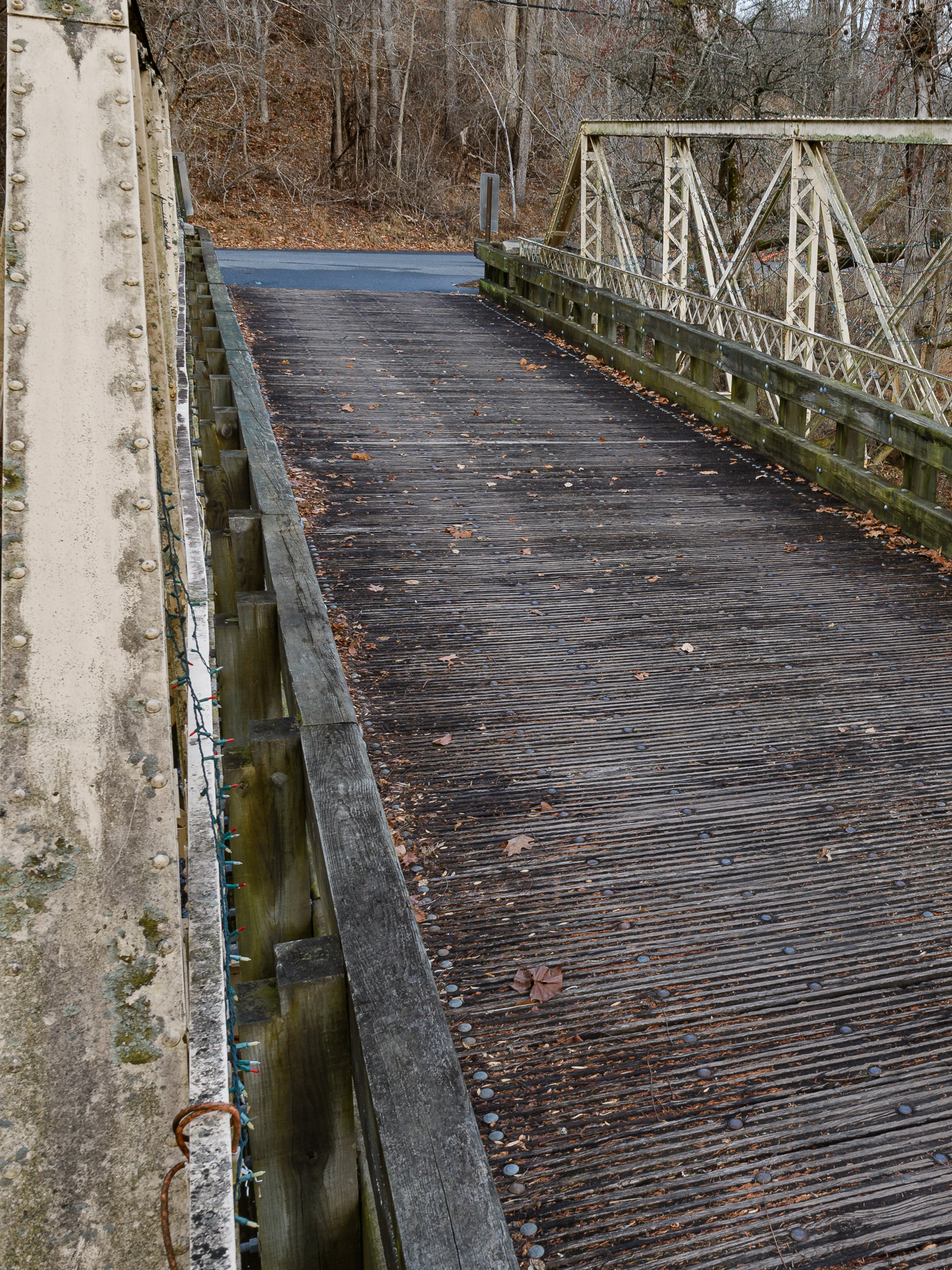
View of web trusses & wood roadway slats

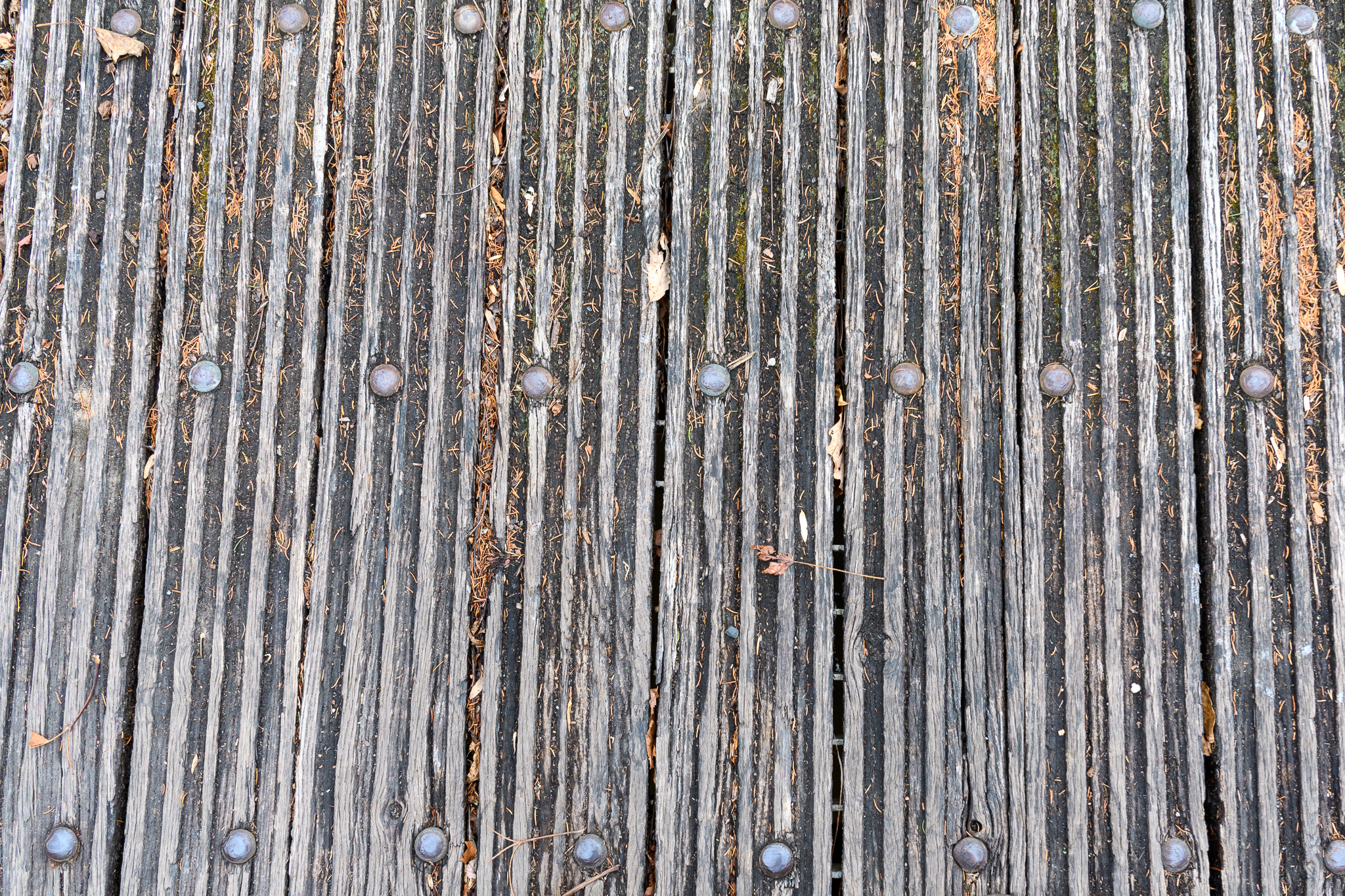
wooden roadway slats
