= Pickering Valley Railroad =

Overview
- Headquarters: Phoenixville, Pennsylvania; Philadelphia, Pennsylvania
- Locale: Pennsylvania
- Dates of operation: 1871–1906
- Successor: Reading Railroad

Technical
- Track gauge: 4 ft 8 1/2 in (1,435 mm) standard gauge
- Length: 11.3 miles (18.2 kilometres)

The Pickering Valley Railroad was a short line railroad in Chester County, Pennsylvania. It ran from Phoenixville to Byers, near Eagle, in Upper Uwchlan Township, a distance of approximately 11 miles (18 km), over which distance it gained 316 feet (96 m) in elevation. Operated as a unit of the Reading Railroad, the Pickering Valley was not a great success; passenger service was discontinued in 1934, and most of the line was abandoned in 1948. The remainder of the line was closed in the 1980s; little remains today.

== History ==
This share certificate was issued to the Phoenix Iron Co. in 1871.

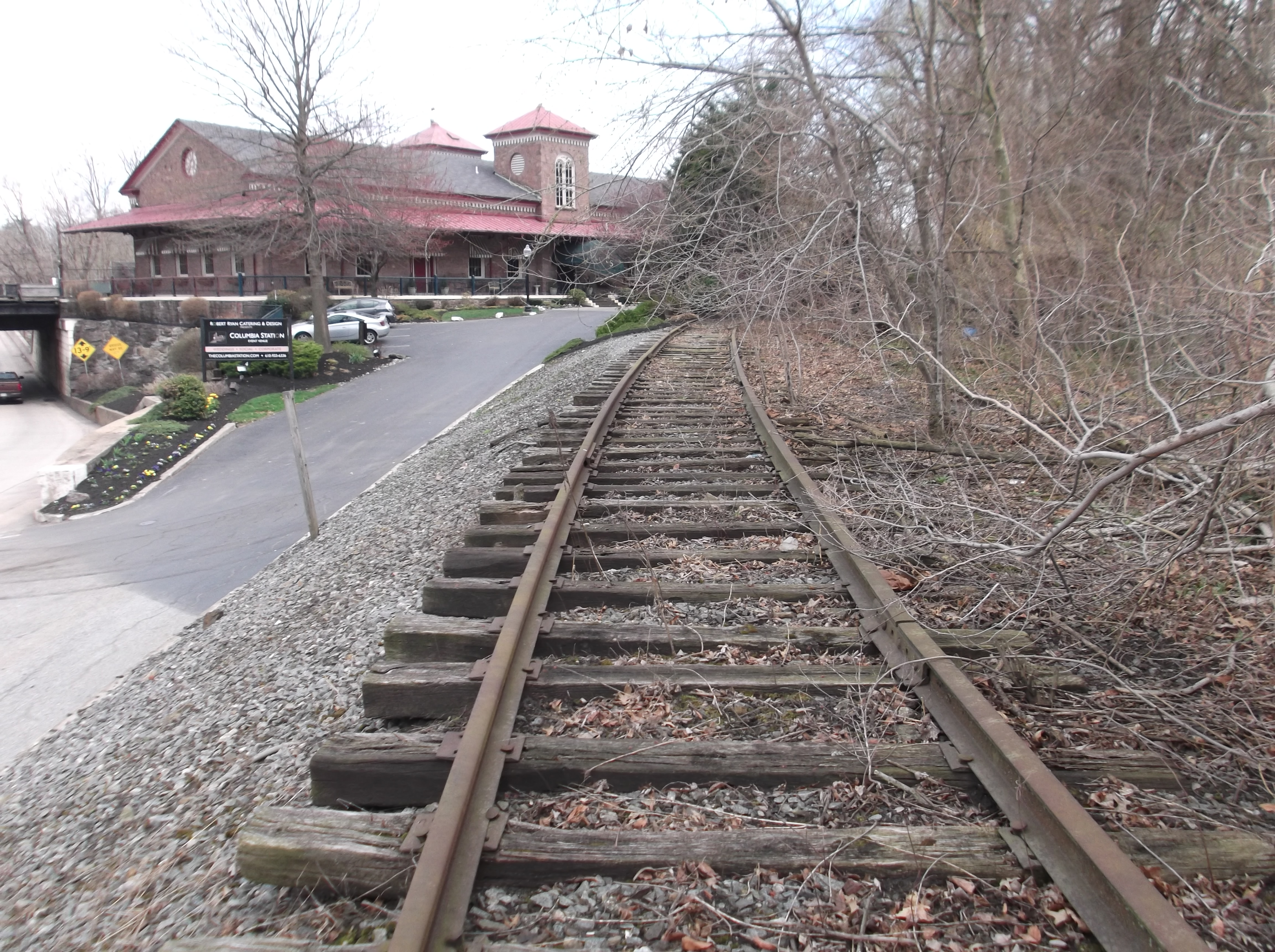
About 300 feet (100m) of abandoned track remains in Phoenixville.

The company was incorporated on June 4, 1869, under the provisions of a special act of the Pennsylvania government approved on April 3, 1869, and organized on June 22, 1869, with the Philadelphia and Reading Railroad Company subscribing to the bulk of the stock. In or about 1870, the still-unbuilt railroad was leased to the Philadelphia and Reading; (Note: In the years shortly after the American Civil War, this was a common arrangement in the United States: a railroad contemplating building an extension or branch line, but reluctant to finance construction itself, would form a new railroad company, lease the prospective railroad to the existing railroad, sell stock in the new corporation to the public, and buy the remaining stock itself (to provide the capital that the public sale did not). The money raised by the stock sale would then be used for the construction of the new line, which was frequently operated as if it was an integral part of the "parent" company.) it opened its operations in September 1871.

The railroad's principal business was as a "milk run" line, transporting agricultural products from local farms to Phoenixville, for connections with other railroad lines and especially for shipment to Philadelphia; it also carried iron ore from nearby mines to the Phoenix Iron Company in Phoenixville. It played a role in the development of the area's graphite mining industry as well. The company was not a financial success: revenues barely covered operating costs, leaving nothing to pay to the investors (an 1882 newspaper editorial complained that the company's stock was "worthless"). When the lease expired in 1906, the line was more formally merged into the Philadelphia and Reading Railroad system, becoming known as the Pickering Valley Branch of the Reading.

The Montgomery and Chester Electric Railway, opened in 1899, provided local trolley service between Phoenixville and Spring City, to the northwest. The original line met with the Pickering Valley's at Ironsides, just west of Phoenixville; the Pickering Valley refused to allow the M&C's track to cross its own, requiring passengers to ride one trolley to Ironsides, cross the Pickering Valley's tracks on foot, and take another car to their destination. Not until 1908 was an arrangement made to permit building a trestle 517 feet (158 m) long, bridging the railroad's right of way and allowing through trolley service.

Passenger service on the Pickering Valley Branch was discontinued in 1934 after it made only $13.10 in seven months, and the portion of the line from Kimberton to Byers was abandoned in 1948. The remaining track served the Phoenix steel mill (a portion was also briefly used by the Valley Forge Scenic Railroad) until abandoned by Conrail (successor to the Reading) in 1982. Little remains of the line today.

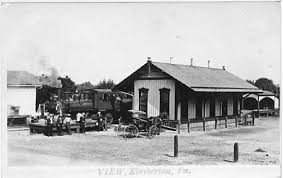
Kimberton station, ca. 1908

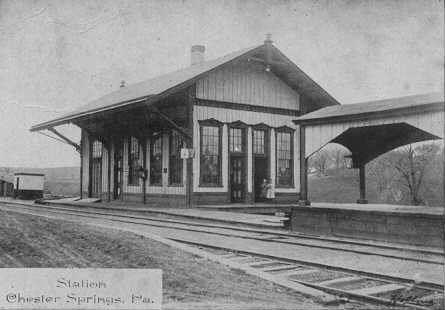
Chester Springs station, ca. 1900

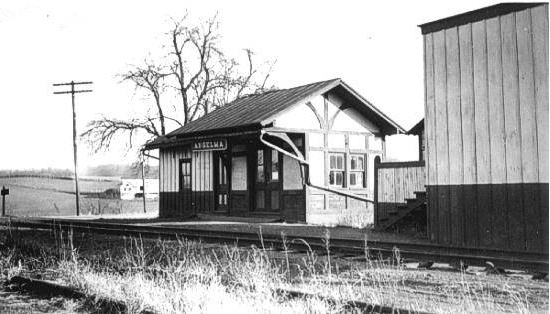
Anselma station, ca. 1935

Station Name	Distance		Notes
Station Name	mi	km	Notes
Phoenixville	0.0	0.0	Connection with Reading Co.
Main Street (Phoenixville)	0.5	0.8	
Phoenixville (freight spur)			425 Bridge Street
Ironsides	1.5	2.4	Near Schuylkill Road and Township Line Road; also called French Creek Sta.
French Creek Junction	3.2	5.1	Connection with Delaware River & Lancaster Railroad
Kimberton	3.7	6.0	2205 Kimberton Road
Hallman's	5.5	8.9	At Old Kimberton Road, near present-day Pike Springs Road; formerly called Hartman's Station
Pikeland	7.0	11.3	At Pikeland Road
Chester Springs	7.5	12.1	Served Yellow Springs
Camp	?	?	Appears only on the oldest maps (Note: "Camp Station" appears on the 1873 county atlas map of West Pikeland Township (Atlas of Chester Co., Pennsylvania, A.R. Witmer, Safe Harbor, Pa., 1873, map 48), but not the 1883 map (Breou's Official Series of Farm Maps: Chester County, W.H. Kirk & Co., Philadelphia, 1883).)
Anselma	9.0	14.5	Originally "Cambria"; the village was renamed "Anselma" in 1886.
Lionville	9.8	15.8	At Lionville Station Road
Byers	11.0	17.7	Terminus; near Byers Road and Graphite Mine Road

== Accidents ==
The Pickering Valley Railroad was the scene of a significant wreck on the night of October 4, 1877. A torrential ("phenomenal") rainstorm had washed out a portion of the track near Kimberton, and a passenger train from Phoenixville, carrying about 130 people, including many returning from a Pennypacker family reunion held on the hundredth anniversary of the Battle of Germantown, ran into the washout in the dark. The locomotive plunged thirty feet, the first passenger car fell on top of the locomotive, and the second passenger car landed atop the first. Seven passengers and crew were killed and dozens suffered varying degrees of injury. The wreck was the worst railroad accident in the history of Chester County.

A coroner's jury, investigating the accident, found that while the rainstorm was indeed phenomenal, the railroad had not allowed for sufficient drainage in the area. More dangerously, the railroad ran the train with the locomotive backwards, and the cars in improper order:

First, the engine reversed, with tank foremost and engine running backward, with the head light upon the front end of the tank as it ran; second, the gentlemen's car, on the night in question, occupied by both sexes; third, the combination of ladies’ and baggage car in one; fourth, and last, the milk car . . . The train was run in this manner in violation of the rules of the Philadelphia and Reading Railroad Company, operators of the Pickering Valley Railroad . . .

The jury concluded that if the railroad had followed its own rules, and had ordered the consist so that the locomotive was first and the milk car second, followed by the two passenger cars, one of the passenger cars would have remained on the track.

A lawsuit arising from the accident rose to the Supreme Court of Pennsylvania, which affirmed the judgement for the plaintiff in the amount of $3,500. That case became precedent, as the court formulated a rule that when a railroad accepts money and undertakes to transport a passenger, there arises an implied contract of care upon the part of the company, and if the passenger is injured by any accident arising from a collision or a defect in the track or equipment, negligence is presumed on the part of the railroad; the passenger needs only to prove the fact of the accident and the extent of the injury.

On August 4, 1895, the evening train to Phoenixville, carrying members of the Salvation Army returning from a meeting, struck a cow near Kimberton and was derailed. The locomotive and several cars went down a steep embankment. The engineer was killed; the fireman and several passengers were seriously injured.
