= Albert C. Barnes =

American art collector and educator (1872–1951)

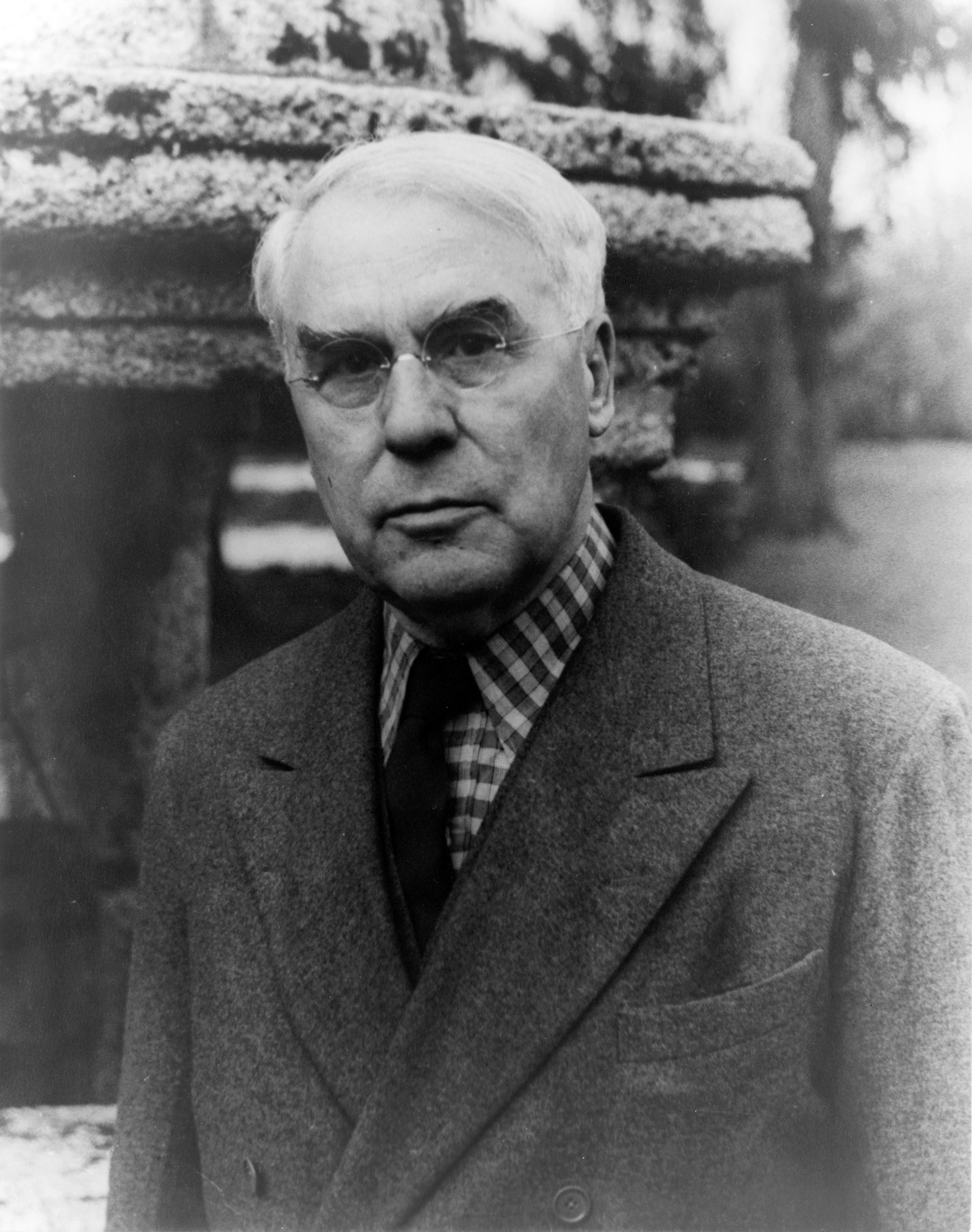
- Albert C. Barnes in 1940
- Born: Albert Coombs Barnes; January 2, 1872; Philadelphia, Pennsylvania, U.S.
- Died: July 24, 1951 (aged 79) near Malvern, Pennsylvania, U.S.
- Education: University of Pennsylvania
- Known for: Businessman, art collector

Albert Coombs Barnes (January 2, 1872 – July 24, 1951) was an American chemist, businessman, art collector, writer, educator, and the founder of the Barnes Foundation in Philadelphia, Pennsylvania.

== Early life and education ==
Albert Coombs Barnes was born in Philadelphia on January 2, 1872 to working-class parents. His father, butcher John J. Barnes, served in the American Civil War in Company D of the 82nd Pennsylvania Volunteer Infantry. He lost his right arm at the Battle of Cold Harbor. After the war John Barnes received a disability pension of $8/month, and took jobs such as inspector, night watchman, and letter carrier when he could find them. Albert Barnes' mother, Lydia A. Schaffer, was a devout Methodist who took him to African American camp meetings and revivals. The family lived first at 1466 Cook Street (now Wilt Street) in the rough working-class neighborhood of what is today Fishtown, and later in a slum area known as "the Neck" or "the Dumps".

Albert Barnes completed elementary school at William Welsh Elementary School in 1885. That year Barnes was one of two boys from his school who were accepted at Central High School, a public school highly respected for its rigorous academic program. Barnes graduated at age 17 on June 27, 1889 with an A.B. degree, part of the 92nd class. At Central, Barnes became friends with William Glackens, who later became an artist and advised Barnes on his first collecting efforts.

Barnes went on to attend medical school at the University of Pennsylvania, enrolling in September 1889 and receiving his degree as of May 6, 1892. He earned his way by tutoring, boxing, and playing semi-professional baseball. In 1892, he interned at Penn's Graduate Hospital then known as Polyclinic Hospital in Philadelphia and at the Mercy Hospital of Pittsburgh. He also is listed as having been an assistant physician at the State Hospital for the Insane in Warren, Pennsylvania in 1893. His experience as an intern convinced him that he was not suited to clinical practice. Although he obtained the degree of medical doctor, he never practiced.

Barnes decided instead to pursue an interest in chemistry as it applied to the practice of medicine. He traveled to Germany, then a center of chemical research and education, studying in Berlin around 1895. Returning to the United States, he joined the pharmaceutical company H. K. Mulford in 1898. The company sent him back to Germany to study in Heidelberg, a city that Barnes described as "a loadstone [sic] for scientific investigators of every land." According to the Archiv für Experimentelle Pathologie und Pharmakologie he was among those receiving firsts and seconds, given June 26, 1901, from the Pharmakologischen Institut zu Heidelberg.

== Career ==
In 1899, he went into business with German chemist Hermann Hille (1871–1962), and created Argyrol, a silver nitrate antiseptic which was used in the treatment of ophthalmic infections and to prevent newborn infant blindness caused by gonorrhea. The two left H.K. Mulford and Company to organize a partnership called Barnes and Hille. This new company was founded in 1902. Hille ran production and Barnes ran sales. The company prospered financially, but the relationship between the two men waned. In 1908 the company was dissolved. Barnes went on to form A.C. Barnes Company and registered the trademark for Argyrol. In July 1929 Zonite Corporation of New York bought A.C. Barnes Company. The move was well timed as the stock market crashed in October that year.

== Marriage and family ==
Barnes married Laura Leggett (1875–1966), daughter of a successful grocer in Brooklyn, New York City, but had no children.

When the Barnes Foundation was established, Laura Barnes was appointed as vice president of the board of trustees. Following the death of Captain Joseph Lapsley Wilson, she became the director of the Arboretum. In October 1940, she began the Arboretum School of the Barnes Foundation with the University of Pennsylvania botanist John Milton Fogg Jr. She taught plant materials. She regularly corresponded and exchanged plant specimens with other major institutions, such as the Arnold Arboretum of Harvard University and the Brooklyn Botanic Garden.

She succeeded her husband as president of the Foundation after his death in 1951. She died April 29, 1966, leaving her art collection to the Brooklyn Museum of Art.

Her work was recognized by the 1948 Schaffer Memorial Medal from the Pennsylvania Horticultural Society. In 1955, she became an honorary member of the American Society of Landscape Architects. She received an honorary doctorate in horticultural science from St. Joseph's University of Philadelphia.

== Art collecting ==
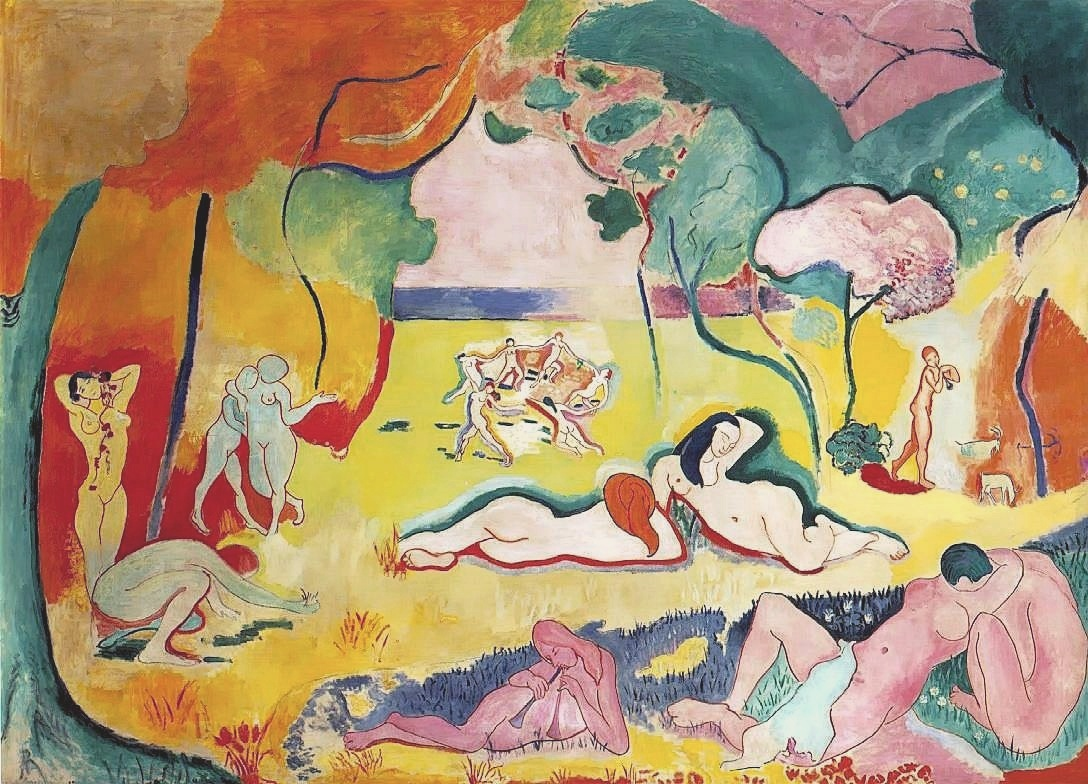
Henri Matisse, Le bonheur de vivre (1905–6), oil on canvas. Barnes Foundation, Philadelphia. It was called Fauvist, bringing Matisse both public derision and notoriety.

In 1911, Barnes reconnected with his high school classmate William Glackens and in January 1912, just after turning 40 years old, Barnes sent him to Paris with $20,000 to buy paintings for him. Glackens returned with 33 works of art.

Following the success of Glackens' buying campaign, Barnes traveled to Paris twice himself, the same year. In December, he met Gertrude and Leo Stein and purchased his first two Matisse paintings from them. Barnes purchased his collection of African Art from art dealer Paul Guillaume (1891–1934), who served briefly as the Barnes Foundation's "foreign secretary."

The collection changed throughout Barnes' lifetime as he acquired pieces, moved them from room to room, gifted pieces, and sold them. The art works in the Barnes Foundation reflect how they were hung and placed at the time of his death in 1951. There are over 4,000 objects in the collection including over 900 paintings and nearly 900 pieces of wrought iron. Some major holdings include: 181 works by Pierre-Auguste Renoir, 69 works by Paul Cézanne, 59 works by Henri Matisse, 46 works by Pablo Picasso, and 7 paintings by Vincent Van Gogh. In 1923, Barnes Purchased Le Bonheur de vivre (The Joy of Life), a painting once owned by Gertrude and Leo Stein, bought from Christian Tetzen-Lund through Paul Guillaume for 45,000 francs. In 1927, he purchased Renoir's The Artist’s Family from Claude Renoir through Galerie Barbazanges for $50,000. The collection also includes many other paintings and works by leading European and American artists, as well as African art, art from China, Greece, and Native American peoples.

== Barnes Foundation ==
Barnes had a longtime interest in education; he held two hour long employee seminars at the end of the day in his factory. At the seminars, his primarily African American workforce would discuss philosophy, psychology, and aesthetics reading James, Dewey, and Santayana. With friend and mentor John Dewey he decided to expand his educational venture. In December 1922, the Barnes Foundation received its charter from the state of Pennsylvania as an educational institution. He hired Franco-American architect Paul Philippe Cret to build a gallery building, residence (administration building), and service building. The gallery served as a teaching tool for students to study art using a method based on the scientific method. Barnes consulted with attorney Owen Roberts (1875–1955) when setting up the by-laws and the indenture. In 1925, the buildings were completed and the Barnes Foundation opened. The collection is not hung traditionally, instead they are arranged in "ensembles" which are organized following the formal principles of light, color, line, and space. The focus of Barnes's teachings were on the art itself rather than its historic context, chronology, style, or genre. Barnes did not provide documentation on the meaning of each arrangement.

=== Operations ===
Since the Barnes Foundation was an educational institution, Barnes limited access to the collection, and often required people to make appointments by letter. He often declined visitors who wrote and asked to visit. He especially did not appreciate the wealthy and entitled requesting visits and would often rudely answer them. In 1939, Barnes sent a letter, posing as a secretary, informing Walter Chrysler he could not visit because he (Barnes) "is not to be disturbed during his strenuous efforts to break the world's record for gold-fish swallowing."

Influenced by the Philadelphia Museum of Art's handling of the donated art collection of his late lawyer, John Graver Johnson, Barnes wanted to make his intentions clear in the Foundation's indenture and trust. It stated, "all paintings should remain in exactly the places they are at the time of the death of Donor [Barnes] and his said wife." From his death in 1951 the specific arrangement of the paintings and art remained the same until, at the request of the Barnes Foundation, the Montgomery County Orphans' Court overruled the indenture in 2004.

Litigation to open the Barnes Foundation to the public began seven months after Barnes' death. In March 1961 it was opened to the public on Fridays and Saturdays, then expanded to three days a week in 1967, after Mrs. Barnes' death in '66, and remained that way until the 1990s. Barnes also had strong feelings against color photographs of the collection as the quality was not up to par with the then current technology. In regards to a request for color photographs Mrs. Barnes wrote to Henri Matisse: “Despite the improvement of the photographic process, it does not faithfully reproduce the exact colors of the artist. And there is further difficulty in making color plates for a book.” The stance is often criticized. The critic Hilton Kramer wrote of Matisse's Le bonheur de vivre: "owing to its long sequestration in the collection of the Barnes Foundation, which never permitted its reproduction in color, it is the least familiar of modern masterpieces. Yet this painting was Matisse's own response to the hostility his work had met with in the Salon d'Automne of 1905."

== Relationship with art world ==
In 1923, a public showing of Barnes' collection at the Pennsylvania Academy of the Fine Arts proved that it was too avant-garde for most people's taste at the time. Some headlines from the time are, "Academy Opens Notable Exhibit: Modern Art Bewilders" and "America’s $6,000,000 Shrine For All the Craziest ‘Art’.” The critics ridiculed the show, prompting Barnes' long-lasting and well-publicized antagonism toward those he considered part of the art establishment. For example, he said to Edith Powell, of the Philadelphia Public Ledger, that she would never be a real art critic until she had relations with the ice man.

Barnes' interests included what came to be called the Harlem Renaissance, and he followed its artists and writers. In March 1925, Barnes wrote an essay "Negro Art and America," published in the Survey Graphic of Harlem, which was edited by Alain Locke. Barnes also continued to support young African American artists and musicians with scholarships to study at the Foundation. At the suggestion of Charles S. Johnson, he admitted artists Gwendolyn Bennett and Aaron Douglass as scholarship students in 1928. Douglas continued to illustrate books and paint murals before leaving to study and work in Paris. Barnes gave scholarships to singers James Boxwill and Florence Owens and art historian Paul B. Moses to study at the Foundation, and also provided funding for violinist David Auld to study at the Juilliard School, and for singer Lillian G. Hall to attend the Westminster Choir College in New Jersey. In 1943, Barnes sent California musician Ablyne Lockhart into the Deep South to become acquainted with "her roots". Lockhart sent Barnes vivid descriptions of her trip which included transcriptions of the spirituals she heard while visiting St. Helena Island in South Carolina. Barnes’s support of African Americans extended beyond the cultural disciplines. As early as 1917, Barnes helped his African American workers buy houses in Philadelphia. In the early 1930s, he provided a fellowship for Philadelphia physician DeHaven Hinkson to study gynecology in Paris. He also paid for the education of Louis and Gladys Dent, the children of Jeannette M. Dent, widow of an A.C. Barnes Company employee, at the Manual Training and Industrial School for Youth in New Jersey, an example of his abiding commitment to his employees and their families.”

== Publications ==
Barnes wrote several books about his theories of art aesthetics. He was assisted by his educational staff, whom he also encouraged to publish their own writings. From 1925-26, he and the staff published articles in the Journal of the Barnes Foundation.

- The Art in Painting (1925).
- The French Primitives and Their Forms from Their Origin to the End of the Fifteenth Century (1931), with Violette de Mazia (1899-1988). A native of Paris, at the time she was a teacher at the Foundation; in 1950, Barnes appointed her as Director of Education.
- The Art of Renoir (1935), with De Mazia.
- The Art of Henri-Matisse (1933), with De Mazia.
- The Art of Cézanne, with De Mazia.
- Art and Education (1929-1939), with John Dewey, Lawrence Buermeyer, Thomas Mullen, and De Mazia. These were collected essays by Barnes, Dewey, and his educational staff, originally published in the Journal of the Barnes Foundation (1925-1926). (Barnes hired Buermeyer (1889-1970) and Mullen (1897-), former students of Dewey, each to serve as Assistant Director of Education for a time; Dewey was Director during this period in what was essentially an honorary position.)

Giorgio de Chirico, Portrait of Albert C. Barnes, 1926

== Later years ==
In 1940, Barnes and his wife Laura purchased an 18th-century estate in West Pikeland Township, Pennsylvania, and named it "Ker-Feal" (Breton for “House of Fidèle”) after their favorite dog. Barnes requested art dealer Georges Keller adopt and bring the dog he met while vacationing in Brittany, France to Merion.

In 1946, Barnes met Horace Mann Bond, the first black president of Lincoln University, a historically black college in southern Chester County, Pennsylvania. They established a friendship that led to Barnes' inviting Lincoln students to the collection. In October 1950, he amended the by-laws of the indenture allotting seats on the Board of Trustees to be "...filled by election of persons nominated by Lincoln University..." also adding that "no trustee shall be a member of the faculty or Board of Trustees or directors of the University of Pennsylvania, Temple University, Bryn Mawr, Haverford or Swarthmore Colleges, or the Pennsylvania Academy of the Fine Arts."

=== Relationship with Bertrand Russell ===
In the 1940s, Barnes helped salvage the career and life of the distinguished British philosopher Bertrand Russell. Russell was living in the Sierra Nevada Mountains in the summer of 1940, short of money and unable to earn an income from journalism or teaching. Barnes, who had been rebuffed by the University of Pennsylvania and the Philadelphia Museum of Art, had been impressed by Russell's battles with the Establishment. He invited Russell to teach philosophy at his Foundation.

Russell invited Barnes to his cabin in Lake Tahoe for discussion. He secured a contract to teach for five years at an annual salary of $6,000, (Note: equivalent to $131,000 in 2025) and subsequently raised to $8,000, (Note: equivalent to $175,000 in 2025) so Russell could give up his other teaching duties.

The two men later fell out after Barnes was offended by the behavior of Russell's wife Patricia, who insisted on calling herself 'Lady Russell'. Barnes wrote to Russell, saying "when we engaged you to teach we did not obligate ourselves to endure forever the trouble-making propensities of your wife," and looked for excuses to dismiss him. In 1942, when Russell agreed to give weekly lectures at the Rand School of Social Science, Barnes dismissed him for breach of contract. He claimed that the additional $2,000 per year of his salary was conditional upon Russell's teaching exclusively at the Foundation. Russell sued and was awarded $20,000—the amount owed being less than $4,000 and which the court expected Russell to be able to earn from teaching in a three-year period.

== Death ==
Barnes died on July 24, 1951, in an automobile crash. Driving from Ker-Feal to Merion with his dog Fidèle, he failed to stop at a stop sign and was hit broadside by a truck at an intersection on Phoenixville Pike in Malvern. He was killed instantly. Fidèle was severely injured from the crash and was put down on the scene.

== The Barnes Foundation in recent decades ==
From 1990 to 1998, Richard Glanton served as President. During his term a selection of paintings were approved by the Montgomery County Orphans' Court to tour and raise money for renovations. From 1993 to 1995, The Great French Paintings from the Barnes Foundation: Impressionist, Post-Impressionist, and Early Modern exhibited. The paintings and other works attracted huge crowds in seven international cities.

In 1998, Kimberly Camp became the first professional director in the history of the Barnes Foundation. When Camp arrived in the fall of 1998, the Foundation had a $3.3 million deficit and was embroiled in numerous court cases. Under Camp's leadership, the deficit was eliminated, excepting a $1 million structural deficit due to FASB changes. Camp led the Foundation's restoration of the arboretum in Merion and its second campus, Ker-feal, a 132-acre farm in Chester Springs. The Ker-feal restoration included a full inventory and mold remediation, funded in part by the West Pikeland Township. Camp restaffed the Foundation with professionals in their respective fields. The education program was returned to the methods used by Barnes during his lifetime. The retail division became for the first time, a profit center. A licensing program was established allowing international use of images from the collection. Programs were established for regional K-12 schools, as was intended by Barnes as documented in his papers.

Camp's work with her conservator, registrar, archivist and advisory committee created the Collection Assessment Project, a multi-year, multi-million effort to catalog the collection, conduct conservation assessments and catalog archival records. With over 1,000,000 records, the Barnes archives is now public. It was Camp's research that provided the basis for the petition to relocate the Barnes Foundation to its center city location. Documentation provided in court proved, in Barnes' own words, that the foundation could be moved to Philadelphia. Camp remained at the Foundation through 2005 to ensure its smooth transition to new leadership.

In 2002 the Foundation petitioned the Montgomery County Orphans' Court for permission to expand its Board of Trustees and move its gallery collection to Philadelphia and in December 2004 the court approved the petition. A new building designed by architects Tod Williams and Billie Tsien on the Benjamin Franklin Parkway opened on May 19, 2012. The move to Philadelphia was featured in the documentary film The Art of the Steal (2009).
