= Chester Springs Historic District =

Historic district in Pennsylvania, United States

- U.S. National Register of Historic Places
- U.S. Historic district
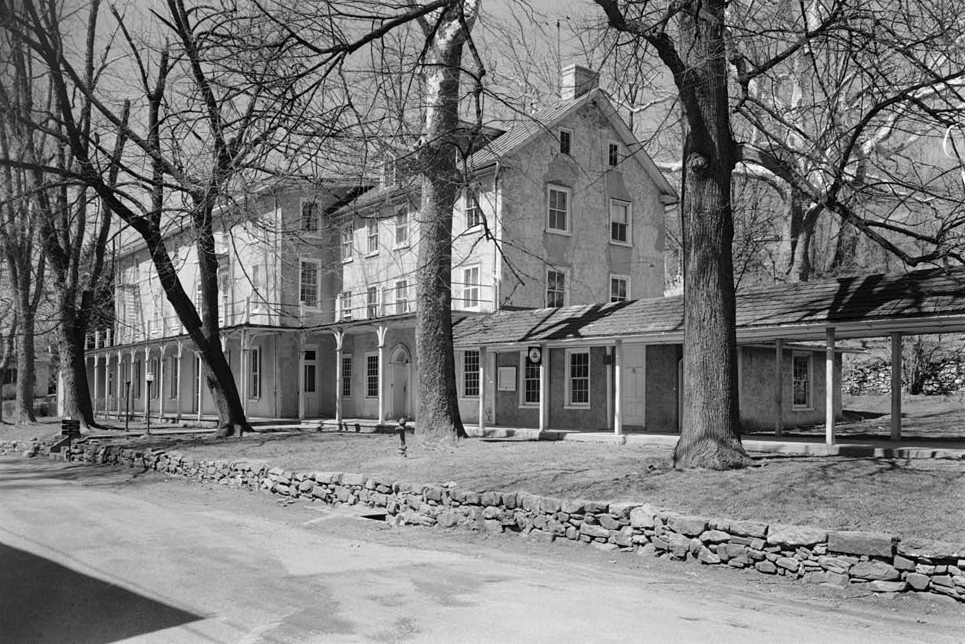
- Yellow Springs Tavern, HABS Photo, April 1959

- Location within Pennsylvania Location within the United States
- Location: North of Chester Springs on Art School Road, West Pikeland Township, Pennsylvania
- Coordinates: 40°05′45″N 75°37′24″W
- Area: 145 acres (59 ha)
- Built: 1816
- NRHP reference No.: 71000691
- Added to NRHP: May 27, 1971

Chester Springs Historic District, also known as The Old Art School, Orphan's School, Yellow Springs Spa, and Good News Buildings, is a national historic district located in West Pikeland Township, Chester County, Pennsylvania. The district includes 7 contributing buildings, 1 contributing site, and 1 contributing structure in the spa community of Chester Springs. The district includes the old hotel and inn, two large residences, a bath house at one end of the springs, and a studio. It also includes a wooden summer house that enclosed the iron springs. The property was the site of a hospital commissioned by the Continental Congress and built in 1777. The three-story, 106 feet by 36 feet wide building burned in 1902, was reconstructed, then burned again in the 1960s. The Yellow Springs resort operated in the early-mid 19th century and many of the buildings date from that period.

It was added to the National Register of Historic Places in 1971.
