= Rice–Pennebecker Farm =

- U.S. National Register of Historic Places
- U.S. Historic district
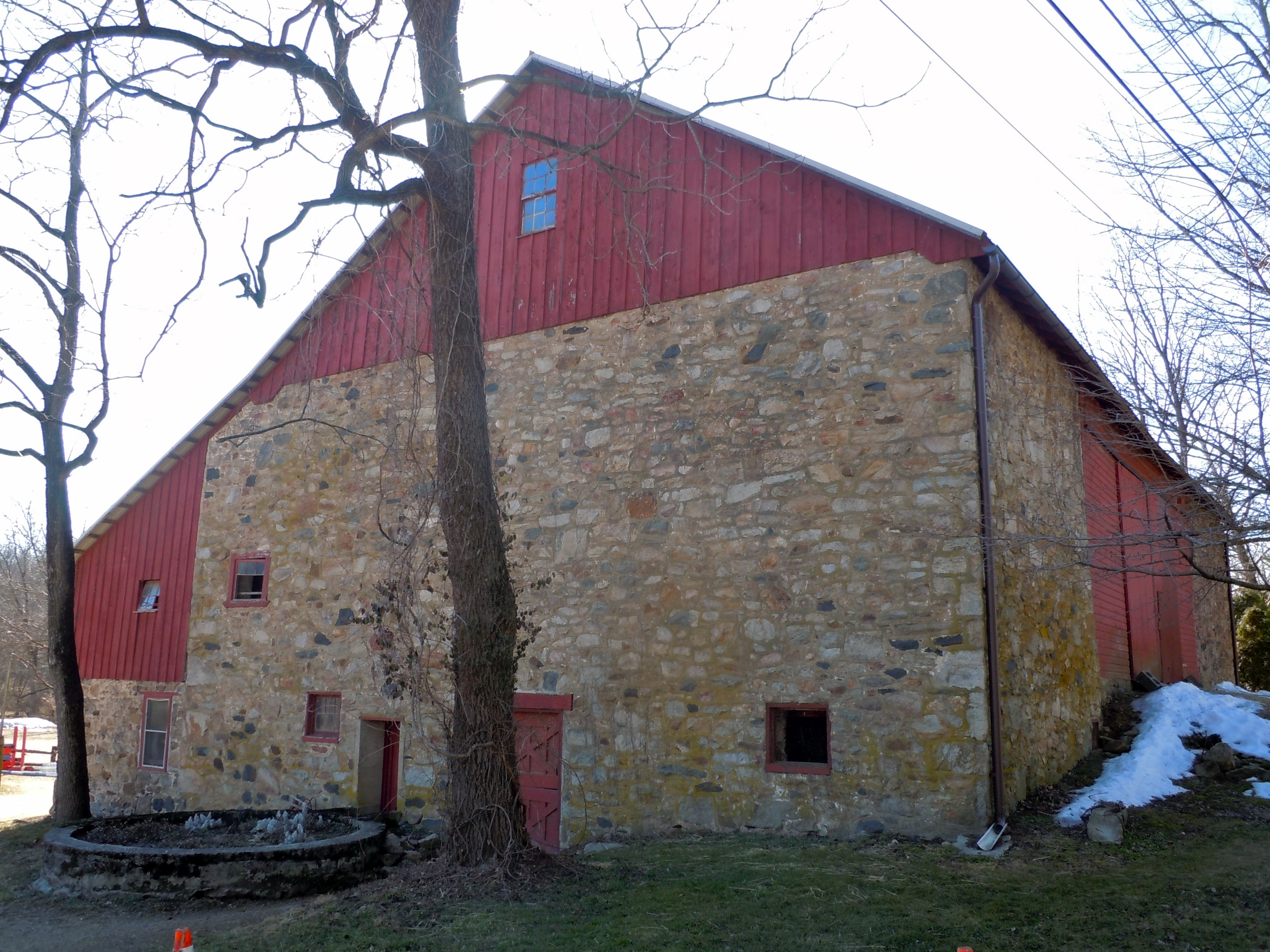
- Pennebecker barn, March 2011

- Location within Pennsylvania Location within the United States
- Location: Clover Mill Rd. near Chester Springs, West Pikeland Township, Pennsylvania
- Coordinates: 40°06′07″N 75°35′59″W
- Area: 42 acres (17 ha)
- Built: c. 1767, 1831-1832, c. 1870, 1960
- Built by: Rice, Zachariah; Et al.
- Architectural style: Georgian
- NRHP reference No.: 86001765
- Added to NRHP: August 21, 1986

The Rice–Pennebecker Farm, also known as the Fox Meadow Farm, is an historic farm and national historic district that is located in West Pikeland Township, Chester County, Pennsylvania.

It was added to the National Register of Historic Places in 1986.

== History and architectural features ==
The farm has four contributing buildings and one contributing structure, including the main house, a wagon shed, a stone barn, corn crib, and a storage building. The main house was created in four sections; the earliest dates to 1767, with additions and modifications made between 1831 and 1832, c. 1870 and 1960. The oldest section forms the rear wing. The 1831-1832 addition is the main part that is a two-story, five-bay, stone structure that was designed in the Georgian style.
