= Jacob Wisner House =

Historic house in Pennsylvania, United States

- U.S. National Register of Historic Places
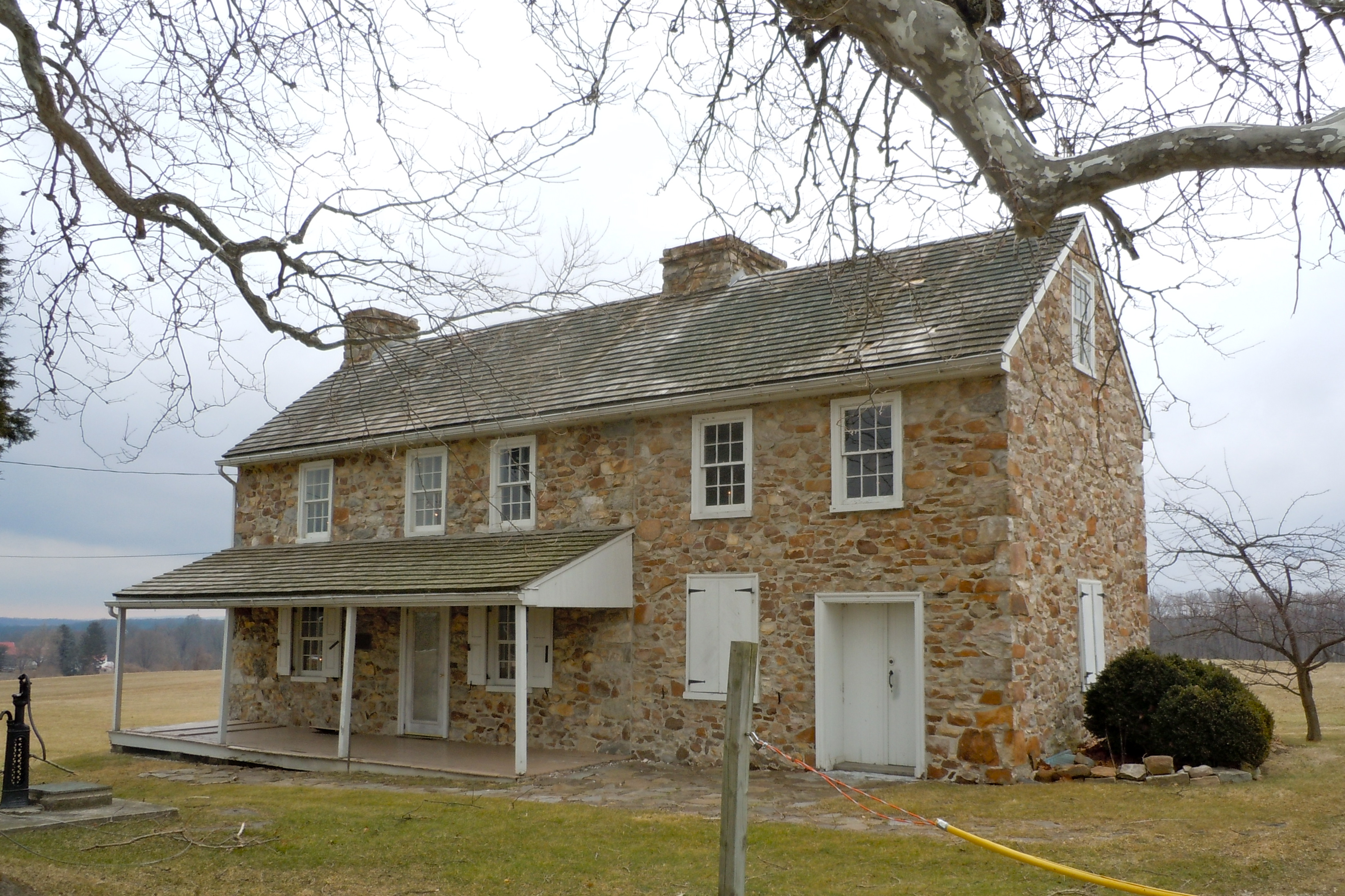
- Jacob Wisner House, February 2011

- Location within Pennsylvania Location within the United States
- Location: Northwest of Malvern on Yellow Springs Road, Charlestown Township, Pennsylvania
- Coordinates: 40°4′23″N 75°34′29″W
- Area: 2.5 acres (1.0 ha)
- Built: 1761
- NRHP reference No.: 79002201
- Added to NRHP: August 6, 1979

The Jacob Wisner House, also known as the Rapp House, is an historic home that is located in Charlestown Township, Chester County, Pennsylvania, United States.

It was added to the National Register of Historic Places in 1979.

== History and architectural features ==
It was built in two sections. The older section dates to 1761, and is a two-and-one-half-story, three-bay wide, stone structure. A two-bay wide extension was added in the 1840s. The addition was originally built to house a saddle and harnass-maker's shop and later housed the Sidley Post Office.
