= Charlestown Township, Pennsylvania =

Township in Pennsylvania, US

Charlestown Township
- Township
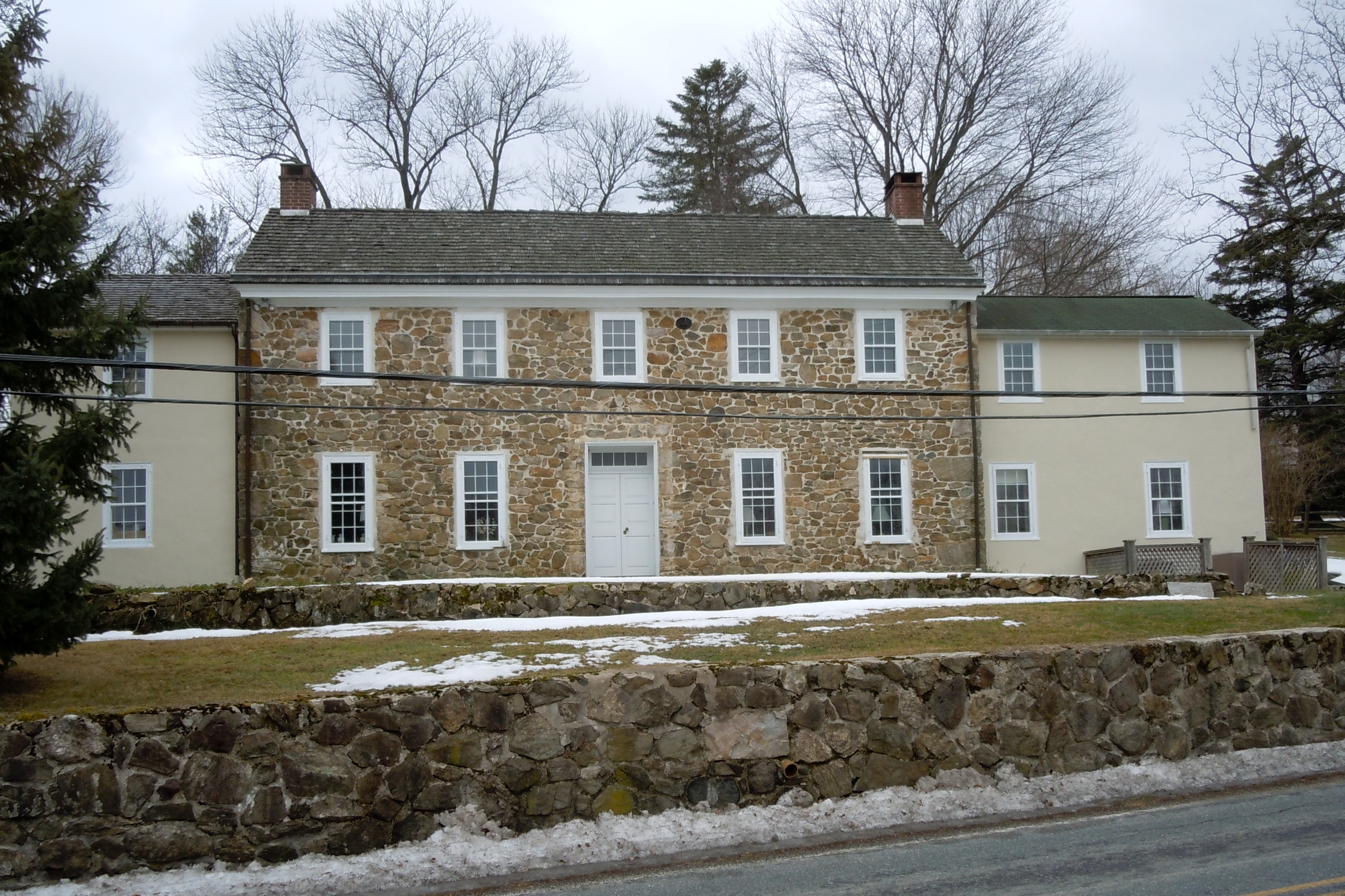
- Martin-Little House, built 1735

- Logo

- Location of Pennsylvania in the United States
- Coordinates: 40°06′01″N 75°33′03″W
- Country: United States
- State: Pennsylvania
- County: Chester

Area
  - Total: 12.53 sq mi (32.44 km^{2})
  - Land: 12.45 sq mi (32.25 km^{2})
  - Water: 0.073 sq mi (0.19 km^{2})
- Elevation: 223 ft (68 m)

Population (2020)
  - Total: 5,999 ▲
  - Estimate (2023): 6,326
  - Density: 461.5/sq mi (178.17/km^{2})
- Time zone: UTC-5 (EST)
  - Summer (DST): UTC-4 (EDT)
- Area code: 610
- FIPS code: 42-029-12744
- Website: www.charlestowntwp.org

Charlestown Township is a township in Chester County, Pennsylvania, United States. The population was 5,999 at the 2020 census.

Part of the University of Valley Forge's campus, formerly the location of the Valley Forge General Hospital, is located in Charlestown Township. The other part is located in Schuylkill Township. The campus straddles the township line.

== History ==
The Charlestown Village Historic District, Middle Pickering Rural Historic District, Martin-Little House, Oskar G. Stonorov House, John Williams Farm, and Jacob Wisner House are listed on the National Register of Historic Places.

== Geography ==
According to the U.S. Census Bureau, the township has a total area of 12.6 square miles (33 km^{2}), of which 12.5 square miles (32 km^{2}) is land and 0.04 square miles (0.10 km^{2}) (0.16%) is water.

Adjacent Townships

- Schuylkill Township (northeast)
- Tredyffrin Township (southeast)
- East Whiteland Township (south)
- West Whiteland Township (southwest)
- Uwchlan Township (west)
- West Pikeland Township (west)
- East Pikeland Township (north)

== Demographics ==
Historical population
Census	Pop.	Note	%±
1930	720		—
1940	726		0.8%
1950	854		17.6%
1960	1,931		126.1%
1970	3,528		82.7%
1980	2,770		−21.5%
1990	2,754		−0.6%
2000	4,051		47.1%
2010	5,671		40.0%
2020	5,999		5.8%
2023 (est.)	6,326		5.5%

At the 2010 census, the township was 84.4% non-Hispanic White, 2.3% Black or African American, 0.2% Native American, 9.0% Asian, and 1.8% were two or more races. 2.6% of the population were of Hispanic or Latino ancestry .

External videos
- Scenes of Charlestown, George Cartolaro

As of the census of 2000, there were 4,051 people, 1,340 households, and 1,003 families living in the township. The population density was 323.3 inhabitants per square mile (124.8/km^{2}). There were 1,397 housing units at an average density of 111.5 per square mile (43.1/km^{2}). The racial makeup of the township was 95.36% White, 1.56% African American, 0.17% Native American, 1.70% Asian, 0.02% Pacific Islander, 0.25% from other races, and 0.94% from two or more races. Hispanic or Latino of any race were 1.38% of the population.

There were 1,340 households, out of which 37.8% had children under the age of 18 living with them, 68.1% were married couples living together, 4.9% had a female householder with no husband present, and 25.1% were non-families. 20.4% of all households were made up of individuals, and 5.8% had someone living alone who was 65 years of age or older. The average household size was 2.73 and the average family size was 3.21.

In the township, the population was spread out, with 25.8% under the age of 18, 10.8% from 18 to 24, 28.3% from 25 to 44, 25.2% from 45 to 64, and 9.9% who were 65 years of age or older. The median age was 37 years. For every 100 females there were 95.0 males. For every 100 females age 18 and over, there were 92.2 males.

The median income for a household in the township was $89,813, and the median income for a family was $101,922. Males had a median income of $77,386 versus $46,026 for females. The per capita income for the township was $41,878. About 1.4% of families and 2.1% of the population were below the poverty line, including 3.2% of those under age 18 and 2.1% of those age 65 or over.

== Transportation ==
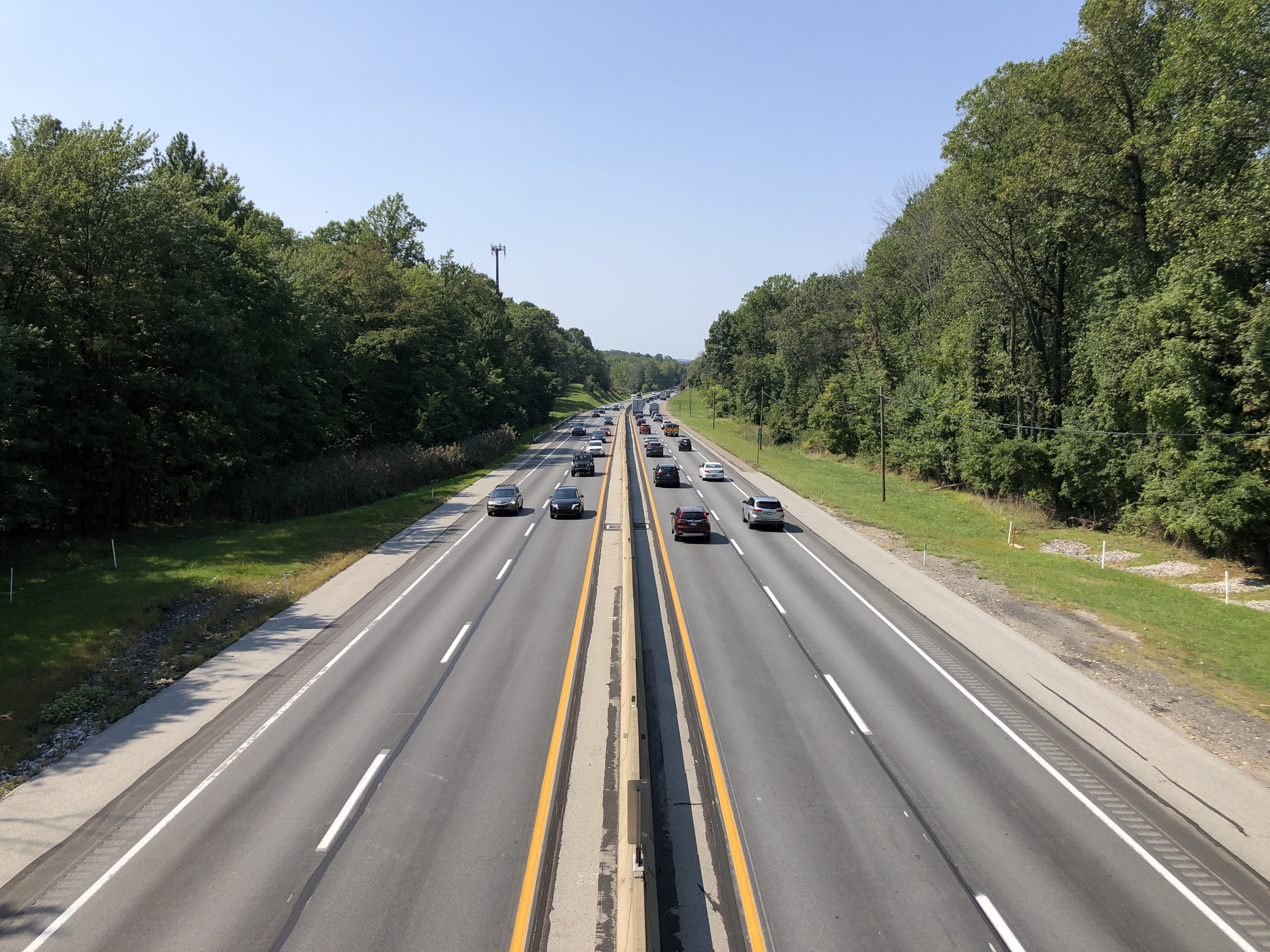
I-76/Pennsylvania Turnpike westbound in Charlestown Township

As of 2018, there were 50.02 miles (80.50 km) of public roads in Charlestown Township, of which 4.40 miles (7.08 km) were maintained by the Pennsylvania Turnpike Commission (PTC), 19.12 miles (30.77 km) were maintained by the Pennsylvania Department of Transportation (PennDOT) and 26.50 miles (42.65 km) were maintained by the township.

The Pennsylvania Turnpike, also known as I-76, is the main highway serving Charlestown Township. It follows an east-west alignment through the southern portion of the township, with an interchange with Pennsylvania Route 29 along the township's southeastern border. PA 29 follows Charlestown Road and State Road along a north-south alignment through the eastern parts of the township. Pennsylvania Route 401 follows Conestoga Road on a northwest-southeast alignment through the southwestern portion of the township.

== Education ==
The township is served by Great Valley School District.
