= Clinger-Moses Mill Complex =

Historic building in Pennsylvania, US

- U.S. National Register of Historic Places
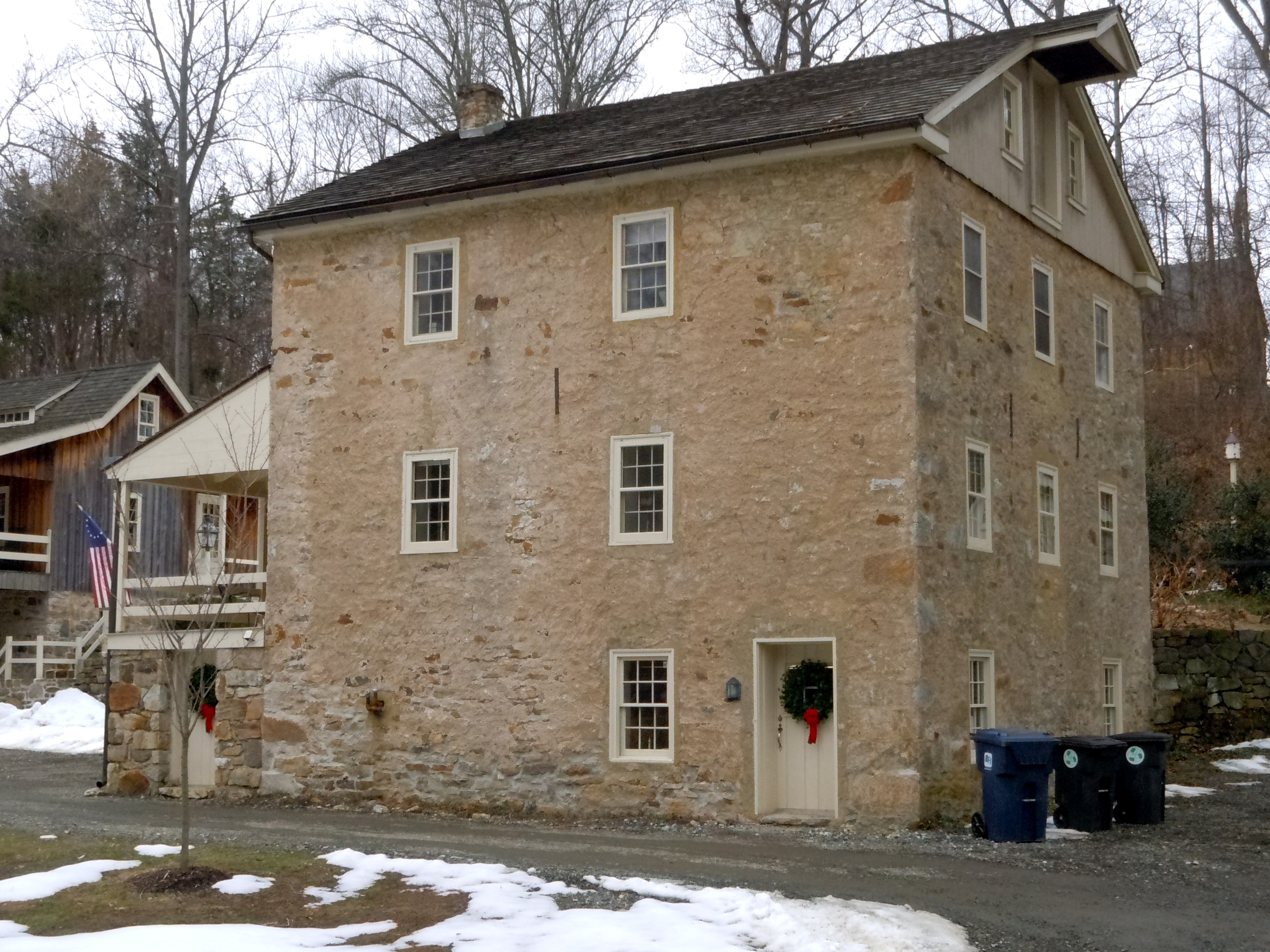
- Clinger-Moses Mill Complex, February 2011

- Location within Pennsylvania Location within the United States
- Location: South of Chester Springs on Pine Creek Lane, West Pikeland Township, Pennsylvania
- Coordinates: 40°04′58″N 75°36′49″W
- Area: 9.4 acres (3.8 ha)
- Built: 1764, 1801, 1860
- NRHP reference No.: 80003454
- Added to NRHP: July 17, 1980

Clinger-Moses Mill Complex, also known as Clement's Mill, is a historic mill complex located in West Pikeland Township, Chester County, Pennsylvania. The property includes the site of two mills, a stone dam, a mill house, stone bank barn, and outbuildings. A former three-story grist mill built in 1860 has been converted to residential use. There is a four-story, three bay by three bay, fieldstone mill building. A five-bay, frame house has been built on the foundations of a former saw mill. The main house was built in 1801, and is a 2 1/2-story, fieldstone dwelling with a gable roof and two-story rear wing.

It was added to the National Register of Historic Places in 1980.
