= Byers Station Historic District =

Historic district in Pennsylvania, United States

Byers Station
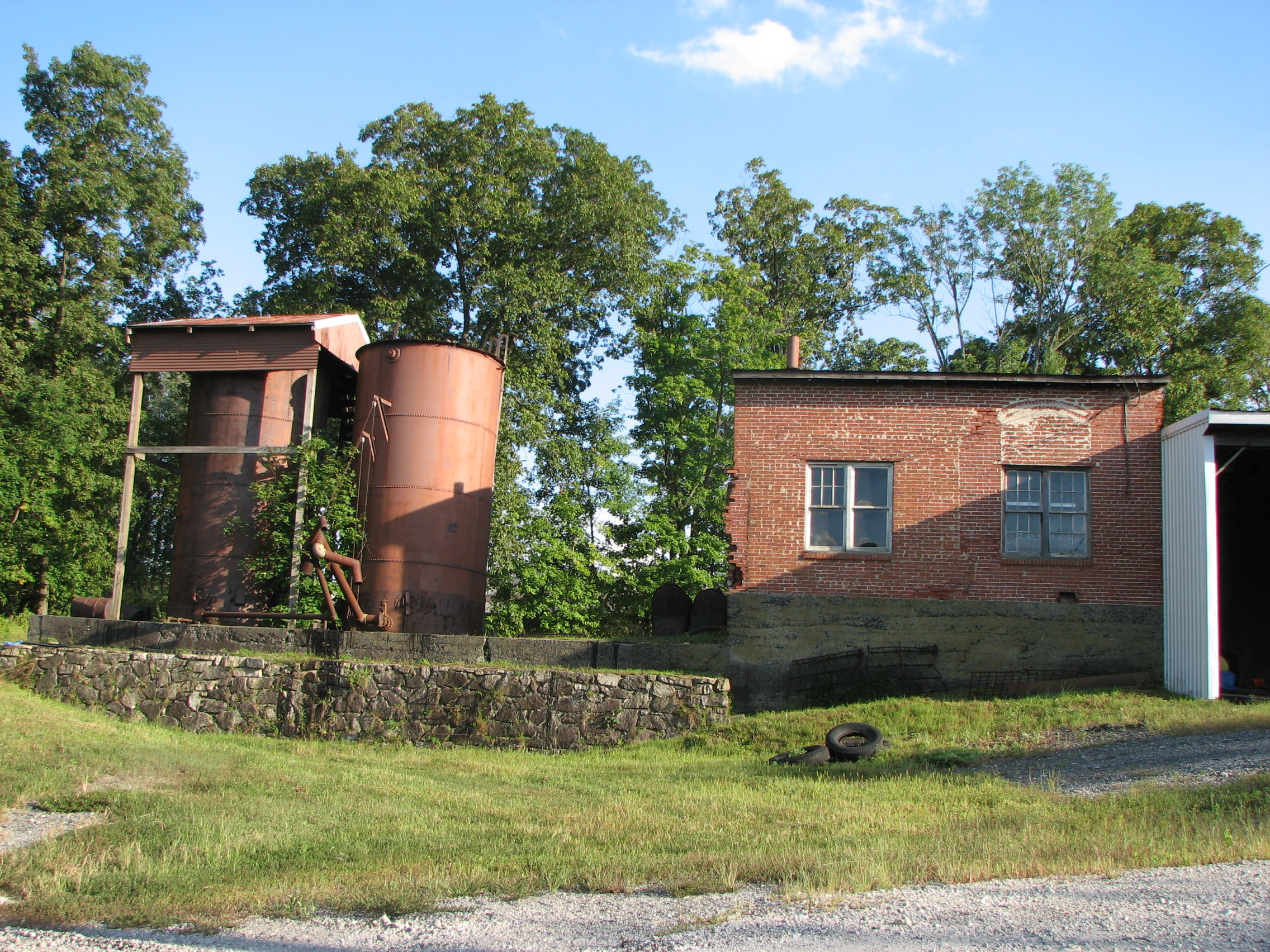
- Former U.S. Graphite Byers Plant, Byers Station Historic District, September 2010

General information
- Location: Jct. of Byers and Eagle Farm Rds., Upper Uwchlan Township, Pennsylvania
- System: Former Reading Railroad station

Construction
- Accessible: No

Former services
Preceding station	Reading Railroad	Following station
Lionville toward Phoenixville	Pickering Valley Railroad	Terminus
- Byers Station Historic District
- U.S. National Register of Historic Places
- U.S. Historic district
- Location within Pennsylvania Location within the United States
- Coordinates: 40°04′48″N 75°40′30″W
- Area: 35 acres (14 ha)
- Built: 1871
- Built by: Downing, B.H.
- Architectural style: Italianate, Greek Revival
- NRHP reference No.: 02000062
- Added to NRHP: February 20, 2002
Location

Byers Station Historic District is a national historic district located in Upper Uwchlan Township, Chester County, Pennsylvania, United States. The district includes 26 contributing buildings in the crossroads community of Byers Station. The buildings date to the 19th century and include a number of notable Italianate style buildings. Notable buildings include a variety of residences, a factory, a Masonic lodge (1894), and the former Byers Hotel (c. 1874). The community grew around the Byers railroad station, after its opening in 1871, and continued after plumbago (graphite) was discovered in the area in 1875.

It was added to the National Register of Historic Places in 2002.
