= John Williams Farm =

- U.S. National Register of Historic Places
- U.S. Historic district
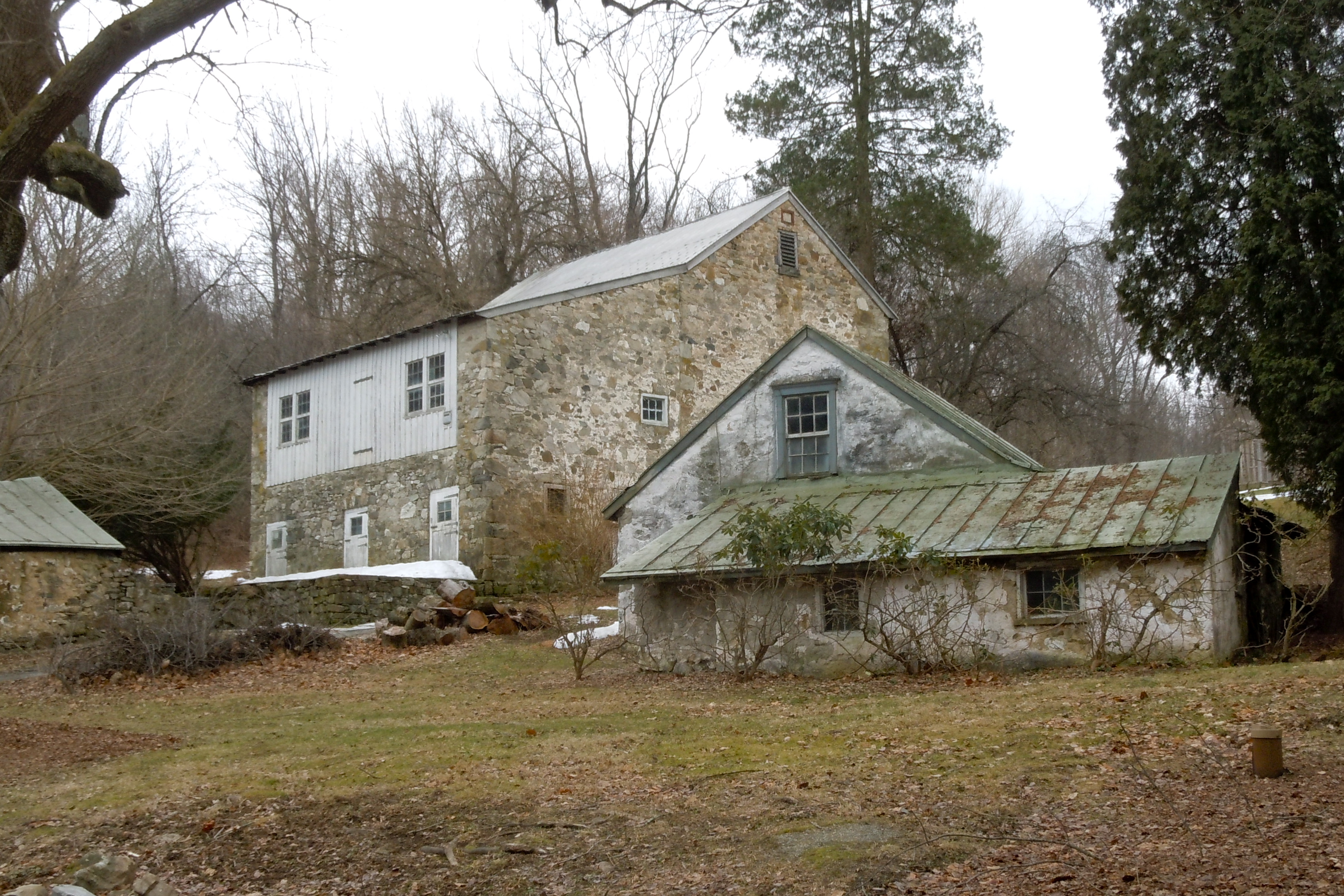
- John Williams Farm, February 2011

- Location within Pennsylvania Location within the United States
- Location: South of Phoenixville on Union Hill Road, Charlestown Township, Pennsylvania
- Coordinates: 40°5′27″N 75°32′19″W
- Area: 54.2 acres (21.9 ha)
- Built: c. 1800, 1827, 1834
- Built by: Williams, John
- NRHP reference No.: 78002377
- Added to NRHP: December 15, 1978

The John Williams Farm, also known as the Davis B. Williams Farm and Stinson Markley Residence, is an historic farm complex and national historic district that are located in Charlestown Township, Chester County, Pennsylvania.

It was added to the National Register of Historic Places in 1978.

== History and architectural features ==
This complex includes five contributing buildings and one contributing site, including the farmhouse (c. 1800, 1827), bank barn (1834), garden and springhouse, wagon house, and the remains of the "necessary" and animal pen.
