= Etna Furnace =

Etna Furnace may refer to:

- Etna, Lawrence County, Ohio, an unincorporated community sometimes called Etna Furnace
- Etna Furnace (Williamsburg, Pennsylvania), listed on the National Register of Historic Places in Williamsburg, Pennsylvania
