= Oskar G. Stonorov House =

Historic house in Pennsylvania, United States

- U.S. National Register of Historic Places
- U.S. Historic district – Contributing property
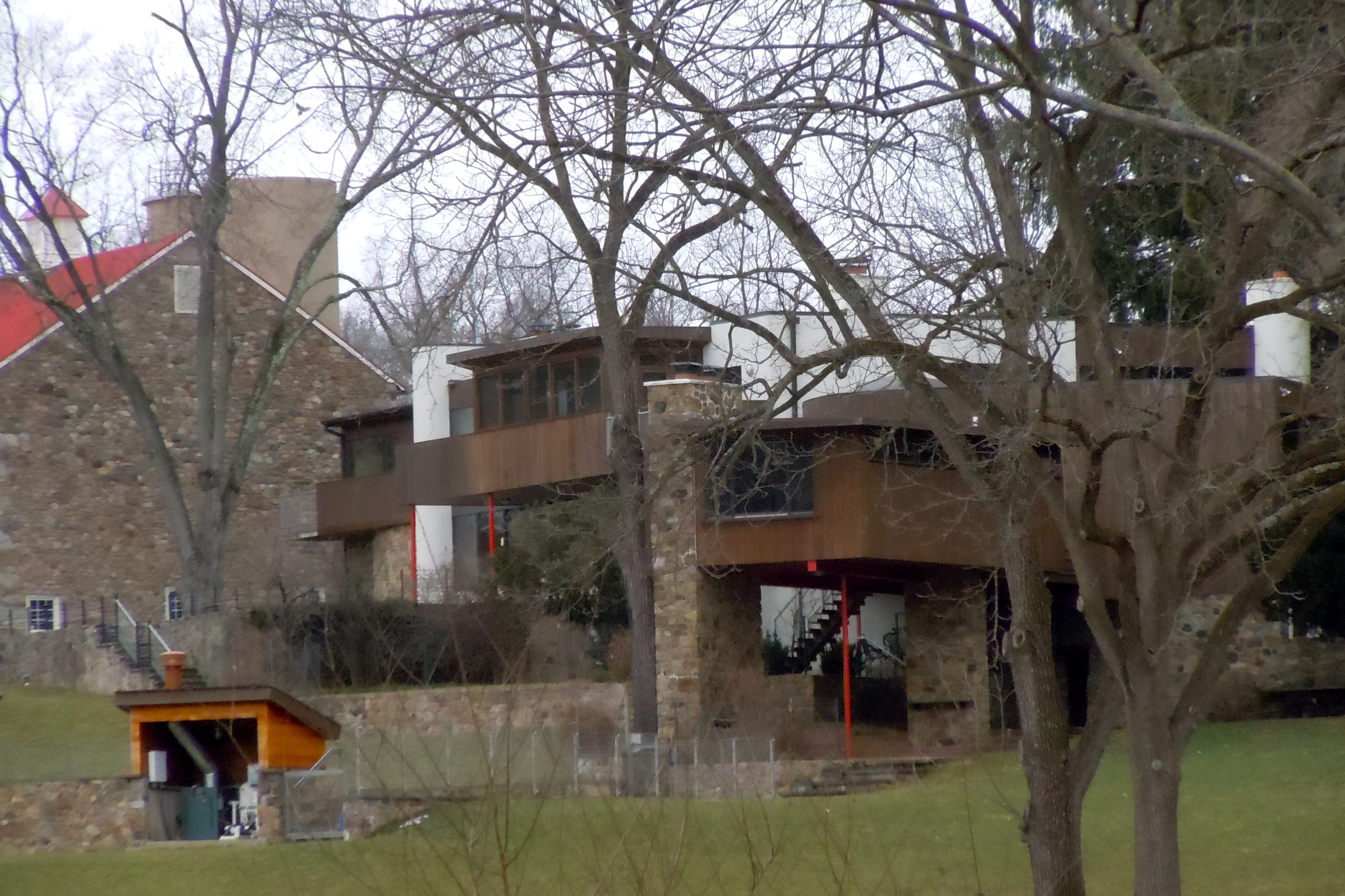
- Oskar G. Stonorov House, February 2011

- Location within Pennsylvania Location within the United States
- Location: Southwest of Phoenixville on Pickering Road, Charlestown Township, Pennsylvania
- Coordinates: 40°6′1″N 75°34′21″W
- Area: 1 acre (0.40 ha)
- Built: 1938
- Architect: Stonorov, Oskar G.
- NRHP reference No.: 75001631
- Added to NRHP: December 6, 1975

The Oskar G. Stonorov House is an historic home that is located in Charlestown Township, Chester County, Pennsylvania, United States.

Located in the Middle Pickering Rural Historic District, it was added to the National Register of Historic Places in 1975.

== History and architectural features ==
Built in 1938, from the stone walls of an existing stone and frame farmhouse, this historic structure is L-shaped, as was the farmhouse, with frame walls sheathed in cypress. Designed by its owner, architect Oskar Stonorov, it features large window openings, and a flat roof with parapet or thin edge overhang. A guest house was added to the property during the early 1950s.
