= Fagley House =

Historic house in Pennsylvania, United States

- U.S. National Register of Historic Places
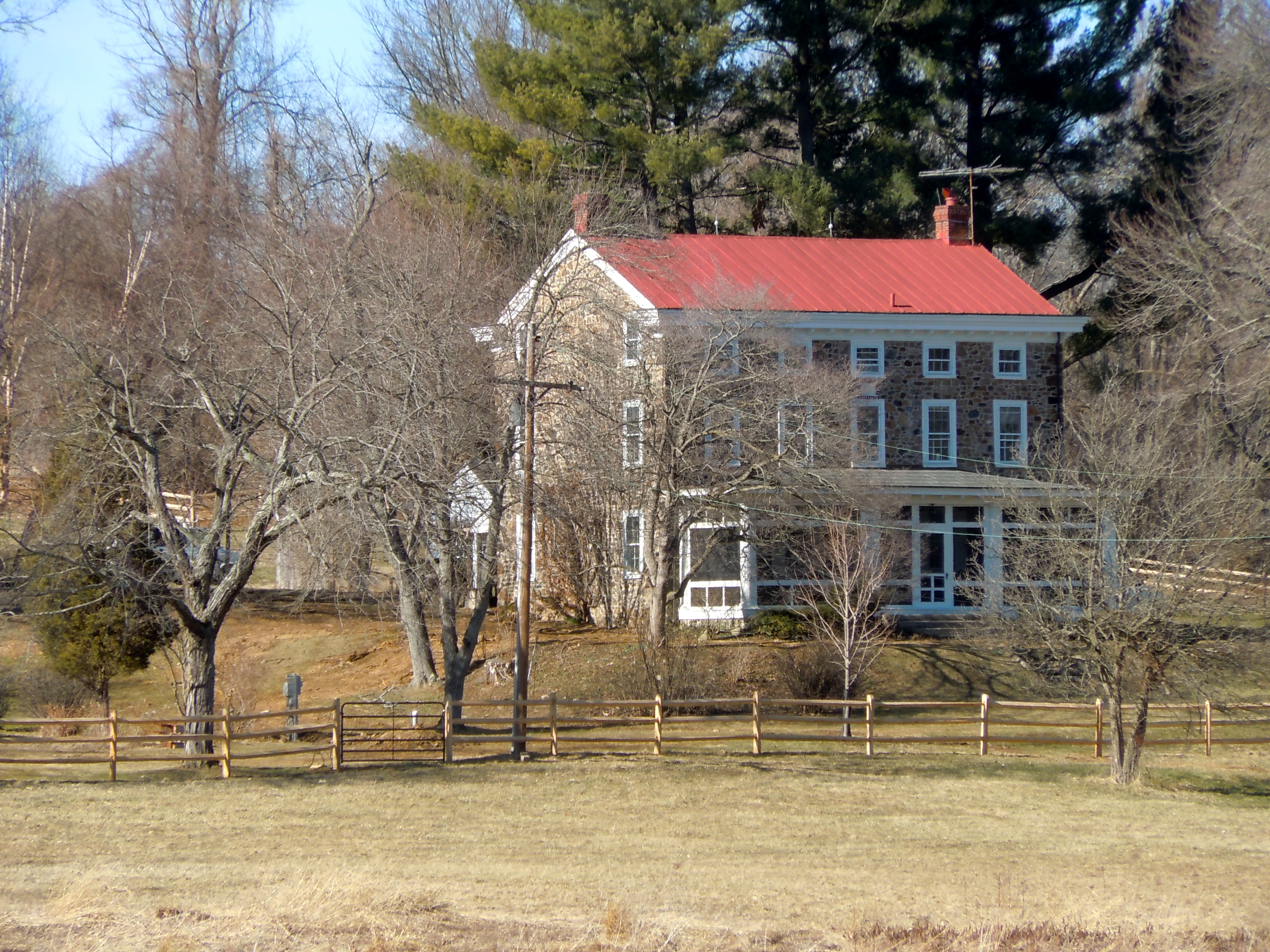
- Fagley House, March 2011

- Location within Pennsylvania Location within the United States
- Location: West of Phoenixville on Art School Road, West Pikeland Township, Pennsylvania
- Coordinates: 40°6′30″N 75°36′45″W
- Area: 0.2 acres (0.081 ha)
- Built: 1860
- NRHP reference No.: 76001628
- Added to NRHP: May 3, 1976

Fagley House is a historic home located in West Pikeland Township, Chester County, Pennsylvania. It was built in 1860, and is a three-story, five bay by two bay, random fieldstone structure. It has a gable roof and a one-story porch supported by four Doric order columns.

It was added to the National Register of Historic Places in 1976.
