= Phoenixville station =

Former train station in Phoenixville, Pennsylvania

Phoenixville
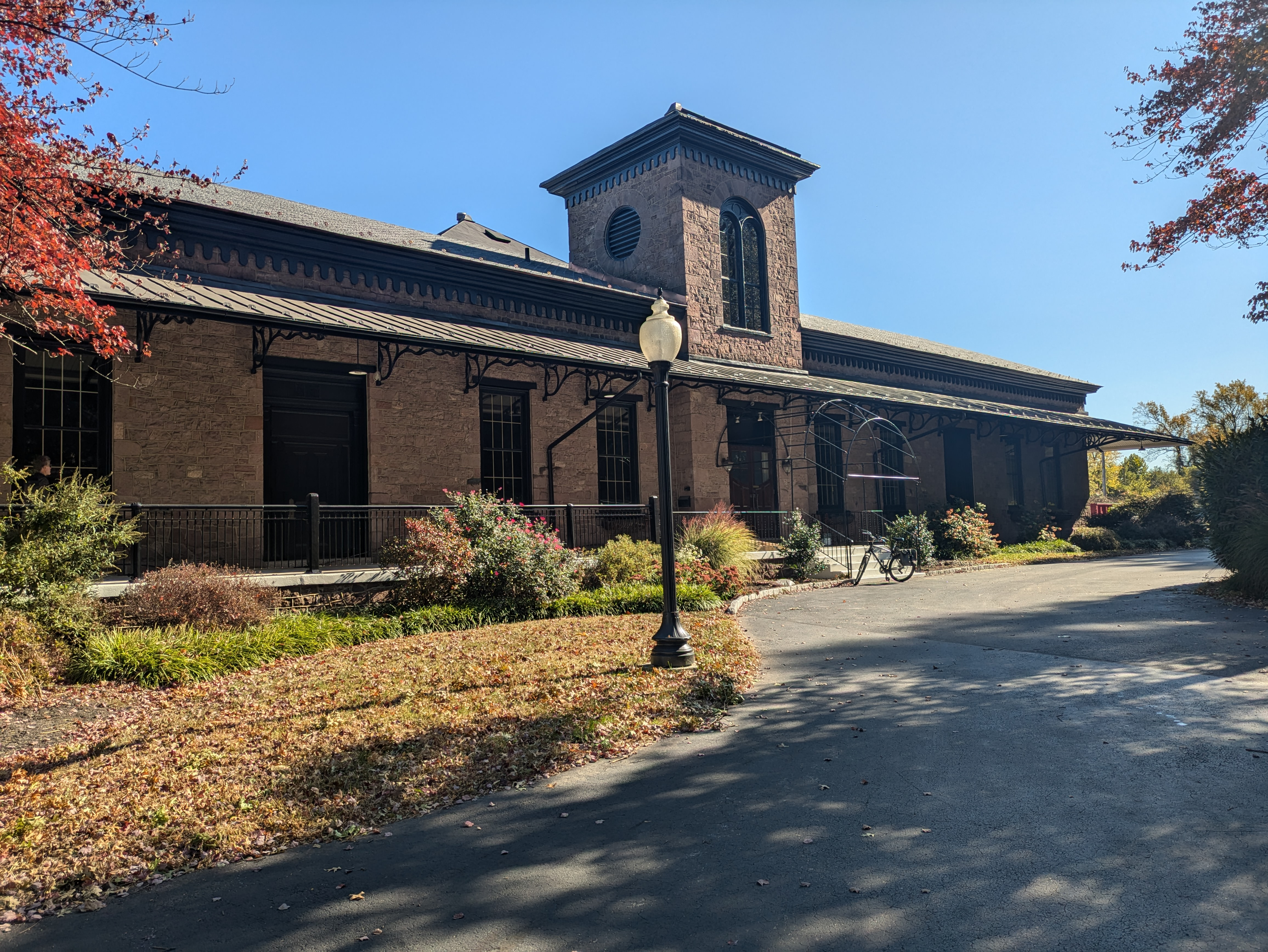
- The former station building in 2024

General information
- Location: 4 Bridge Street; Phoenixville, Pennsylvania
- Coordinates: 40.1345°N 75.5098°W
- System: Former SEPTA regional rail station
- Line: Harrisburg Line
- Platforms: 1 side platform
- Tracks: 2

Construction
- Accessible: No

History
- Opened: January 1, 1842
- Closed: July 26, 1981

Former services
Preceding station	SEPTA	Following station
Royersford Closed 1981 toward Pottsville	Pottsville Line	Valley Forge Closed 1981 toward Reading Terminal
Preceding station	Reading Railroad	Following station
Mingo toward Pottsville	Main Line	Perkiomen Junction toward Philadelphia
Terminus	Pickering Valley Railroad	Main Street, Phoenixville toward Byers
Location

Phoenixville station is a defunct commuter railroad station in the eponymous borough of Phoenixville, Chester County, Pennsylvania. Located at 4 Bridge Street in Phoenixville, station formerly served trains of SEPTA Regional Rail's Pottsville Line, a diesel line between Reading Terminal in Philadelphia and Pottsville station in Schuylkill County. The station consisted of a brick station depot and a singular side platform. The former depot currently serves as a restaurant and catering venue.

Phoenixville station was originally built by the Reading Railroad, and later served the SEPTA diesel service extending from the Norristown section of the Manayunk/Norristown Line to Pottsville. It was taken out of service in 1981, when SEPTA discontinued the diesel service. The station was also the terminus of the Pickering Valley Railroad to Eagle.
