= Ker-Feal =

Historic house in Pennsylvania, United States

- U.S. National Register of Historic Places
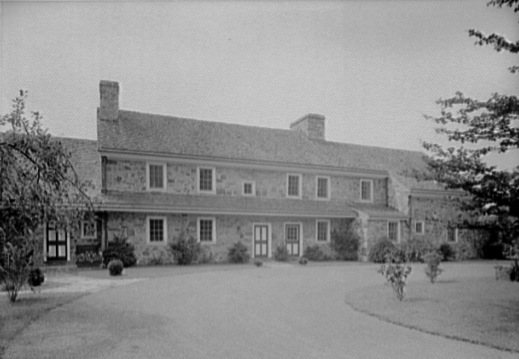

- Location within Pennsylvania Location within the United States
- Location: Chester Springs, West Pikeland Township, Pennsylvania
- Coordinates: 40°4′29.6394″N 75°36′24.8394″W
- Area: 137 acres (55 ha)
- Built: 1775
- NRHP reference No.: 03001125
- Added to NRHP: November 7, 2003

Ker-Feal, built in 1775, is an historic fieldstone dwelling that is located in West Pikeland Township, Pennsylvania. It was listed on the National Register of Historic Places on November 7, 2003.

== History and architectural features ==
The property was purchased by Albert C. Barnes and his wife Laura in 1940 and expanded with two additions. The name "Ker-Feal" means "Fidèle's House" in Breton and was named after Barnes' favorite dog, Fidèle de Port Manech. The property is now owned by the Barnes Foundation. Ker-Feal received an upgraded climate-control system in 2001 paid for with several grants. Another grant in 2006 allowed for grounds assessment.

== See also ==
- National Register of Historic Places listings in Northern Chester County, Pennsylvania
