= Martin-Little House =

Historic house in Pennsylvania, United States

- U.S. National Register of Historic Places
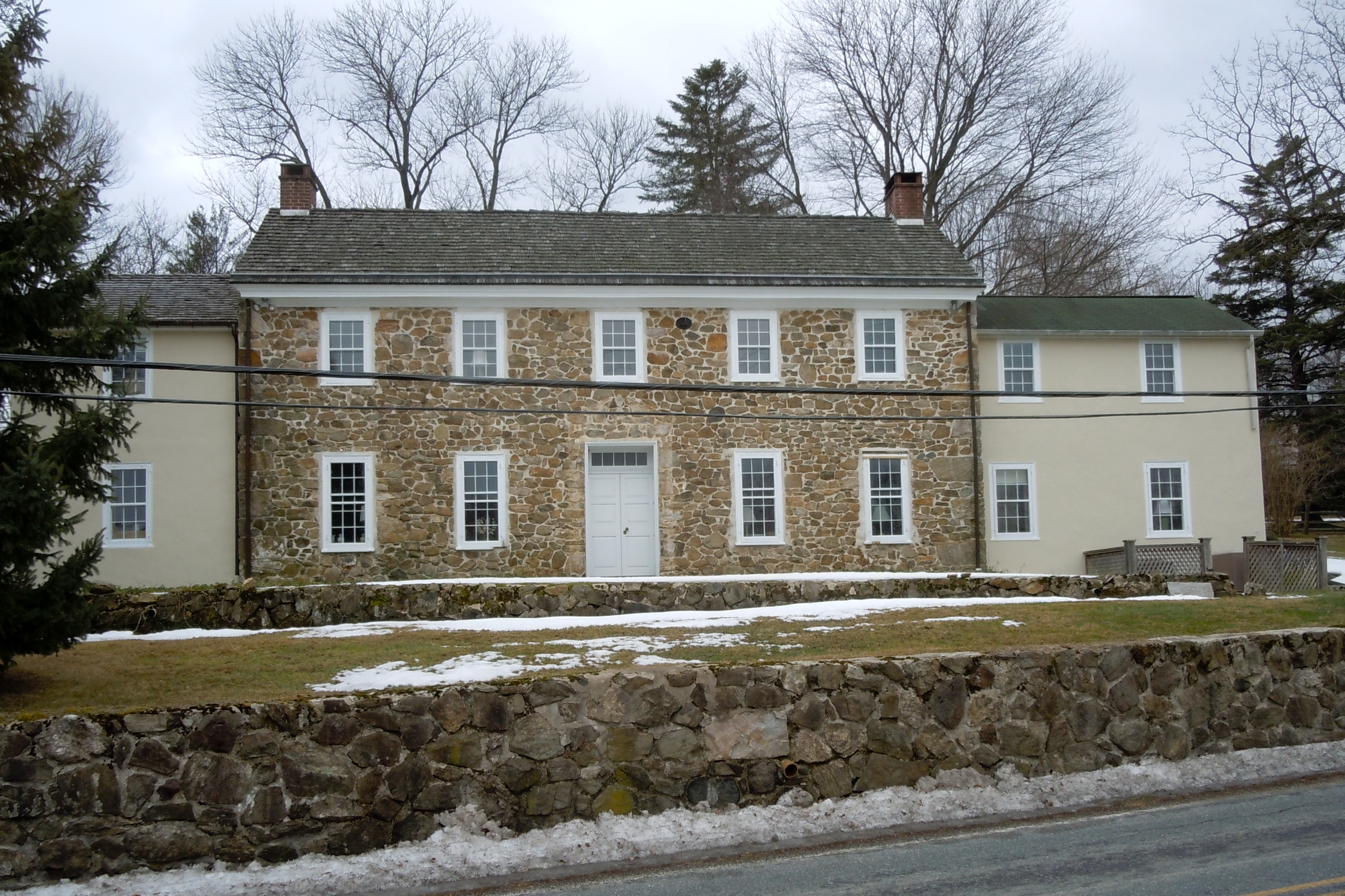
- Martin-Little House, February 2011

- Location within Pennsylvania Location within the United States
- Location: South of Phoenixville off Pennsylvania Route 113 on Church Road, Charlestown Township, Pennsylvania
- Coordinates: 40°5′3″N 75°33′51″W
- Area: 2 acres (0.81 ha)
- Built: 1735, 1810
- NRHP reference No.: 73001611
- Added to NRHP: July 2, 1973

The Martin-Little House is a historic, American home that is located in Charlestown Township, Chester County, Pennsylvania.

It was added to the National Register of Historic Places in 1973.

== History and architectural features ==
This historic structure consists of five sections that were built roughly between 1735 and 1960. The oldest section was built circa 1735, and is a 1 1/2-story, stuccoed, stone, saltbox-form dwelling. A 2 1/2-story, five-bay, stone, main section was added as a wing in 1810. Later additions are the two-story kitchen wing, which dates to the late-nineteenth century, a two-story bedroom wing from the mid-twentieth century, and a one-story, shed-roofed, frame addition from 1960. The oldest section may have served as a stagecoach stop and post office in the mid-eighteenth century.
