= Yellow Springs, Chester County, Pennsylvania =

Unincorporated community in Pennsylvania, US

Yellow Springs, Pennsylvania
- Unincorporated community
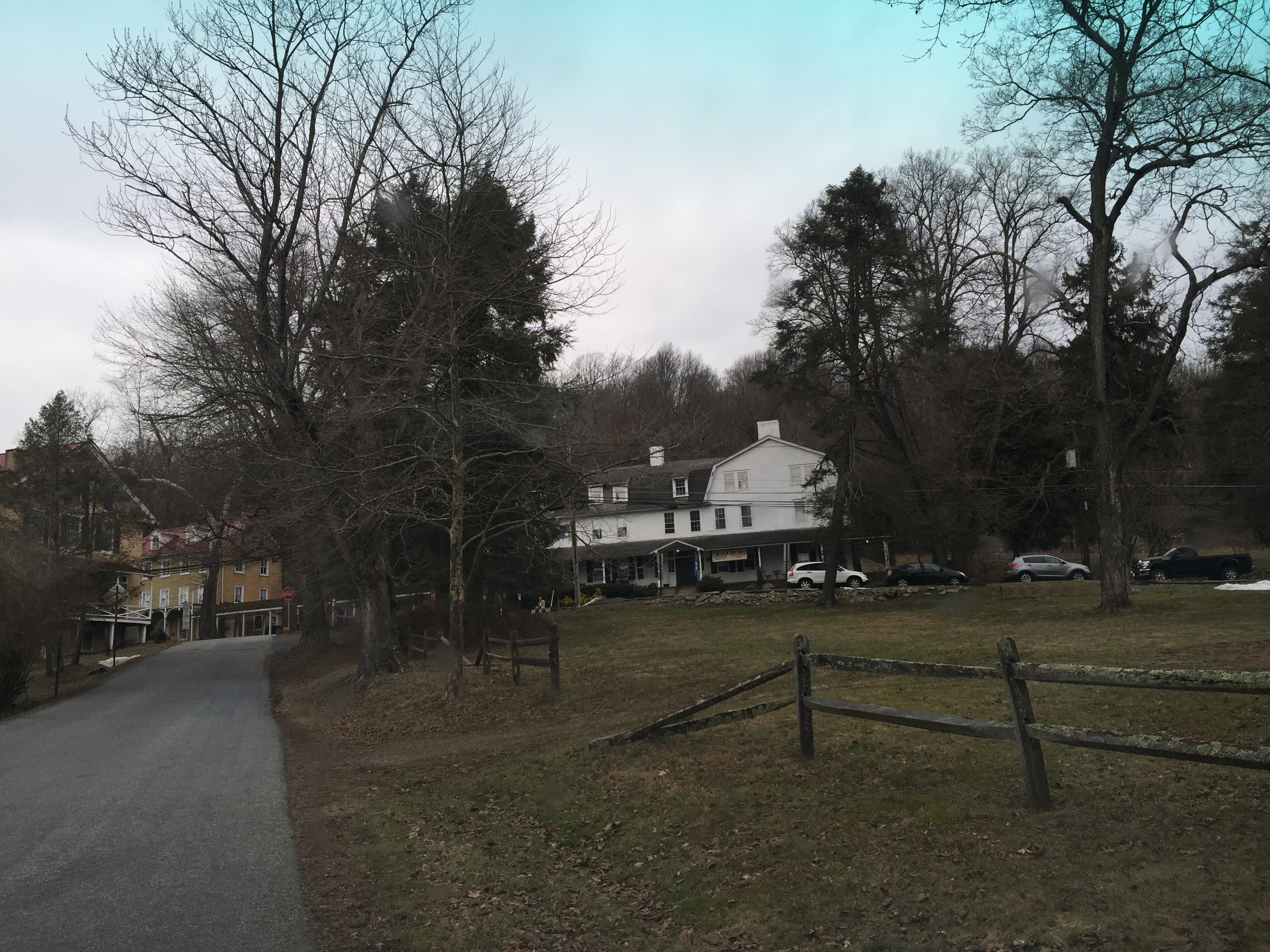
- Yellow Springs Road in Yellow Springs

- Location of Yellow Springs in Pennsylvania
- Coordinates: 40°06′00″N 75°37′23″W
- Country: United States
- State: Pennsylvania
- County: Chester
- Township: West Pikeland
- Elevation: 256 ft (78 m)

Population (2000)
  - Total: 7,520
- Time zone: UTC-5 (EST)
  - Summer (DST): UTC-4 (EDT)
- Area code: 610

Yellow Springs is a historic village in West Pikeland Township in Chester County, Pennsylvania. It is located between Phoenixville and Downingtown.

== History ==
Yellow Springs has been noted as an area with healing water for at least 300 years, and the history of the village predates settlement by European colonists in the 1720s. Local legend credits the Leni-Lenape people with naming the area "Yellow Springs" since they used the iron-rich water from one of several mineral springs on the property for medicinal uses. It is unknown how long the Lenape were using this area as a settlement, and the scale of the settlement is not currently understood. At the least, the Lenape used the land that is now the village as a camp and a location to drink, but more permanent settlement is suspected. Archaeological evidence supports the presence of Indigenous people in the area since at least 3000 BCE – 2000 BCE.

In the 1700s, European settlers started to reside in this area of Chester county. These people were mostly of German heritage. One of the earliest settlements around the modern-day village dated to around 1715. In 1721, the “Iron Springs” of Yellow Springs were first noted on a map of the Township of Pikeland by Isaac Taylor. In 1722, an anonymous gentlemen from New York reported to the Philadelphian newspaper The American Weekly Mercury on Yellow Springs, advising the newspaper of the healing mineral waters that could be found there. In 1753, notable Philadelphian David Rittenhouse visited Yellow Springs to heal and seek treatment for his ulcers.

Yellow Springs; view on Art School Road

The area continued to develop, and by the 1760s, the main village today was a plantation, tavern, and spa that was partially owned by country gentleman and physician, Dr. Samuel Kennedy, and Philadelphian silver-smith John Bayly. By the 1770s, the property was owned by Dr. Kennedy and his family exclusively. There was also a developing village around the Yellow Springs plantation, and today both the plantation's property and the village are considered the village of Yellow Springs. The Kennedy family were friendly with Persifor Frazer and "Mad" Anthony Wayne, and Dr. Kennedy was a supporter of the American Revolution. Continental forces retreated through Yellow Springs during the Battle of the Brandywine, and some of the German-immigrant farmers in the Yellow Springs village opened their land to soldiers to rest and recover. George Washington and his troops also camped at Yellow Springs during the Battle of the Clouds. General Washington used the tavern at Yellow Springs as his headquarters during his time in the village. Congress commissioned that a large General Hospital be built at Yellow Springs after George Washington saw the area and Dr. Kennedy agreed to offer the use of his land for the cause. This general hospital- known as Washington Hall at the time- inoculated soldiers against smallpox and treated most of the sick and injured from Valley Forge.

== Geography ==
The village is located at the western end of Yellow Springs Road, a spur from Pennsylvania Route 113 near Chester Springs.
