= Lightfoot Mill =

- The Mill at Anselma
- U.S. National Register of Historic Places
- U.S. National Historic Landmark
- Pennsylvania state historical marker
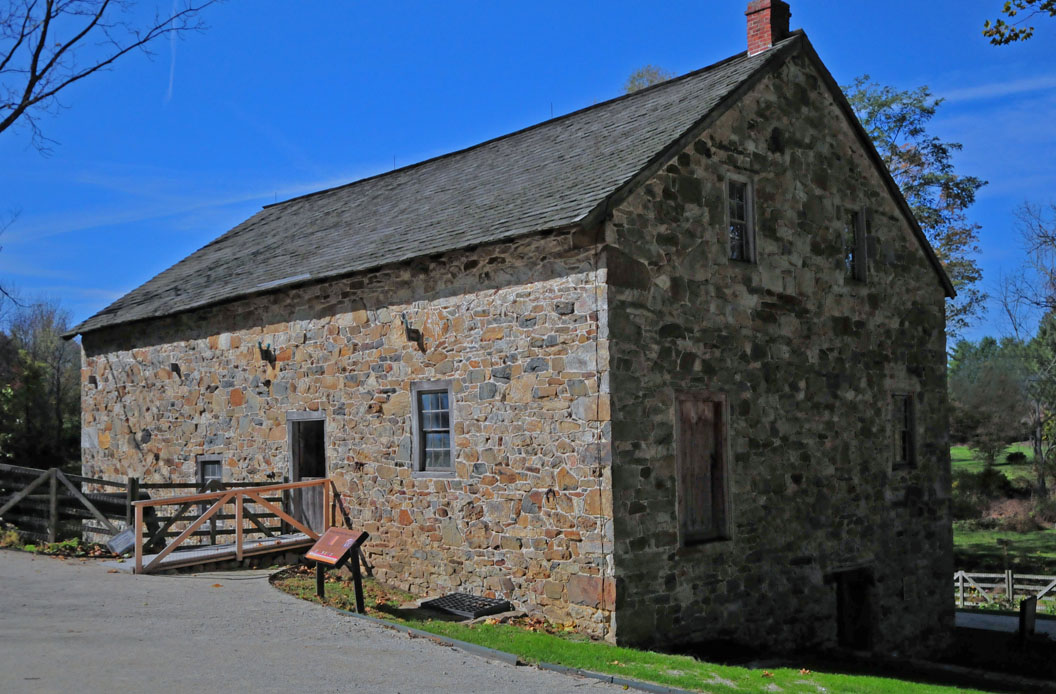

- Location within Pennsylvania Location within the United States
- Location: 1730 Conestoga Road, Chester Springs, Pennsylvania
- Coordinates: 40°4′53″N 75°38′40″W
- Built: 1747
- NRHP reference No.: 73001616

Significant dates
- Added to NRHP: April 13, 1973
- Designated NHL: April 5, 2005
- Designated PHMC: October 13, 2007

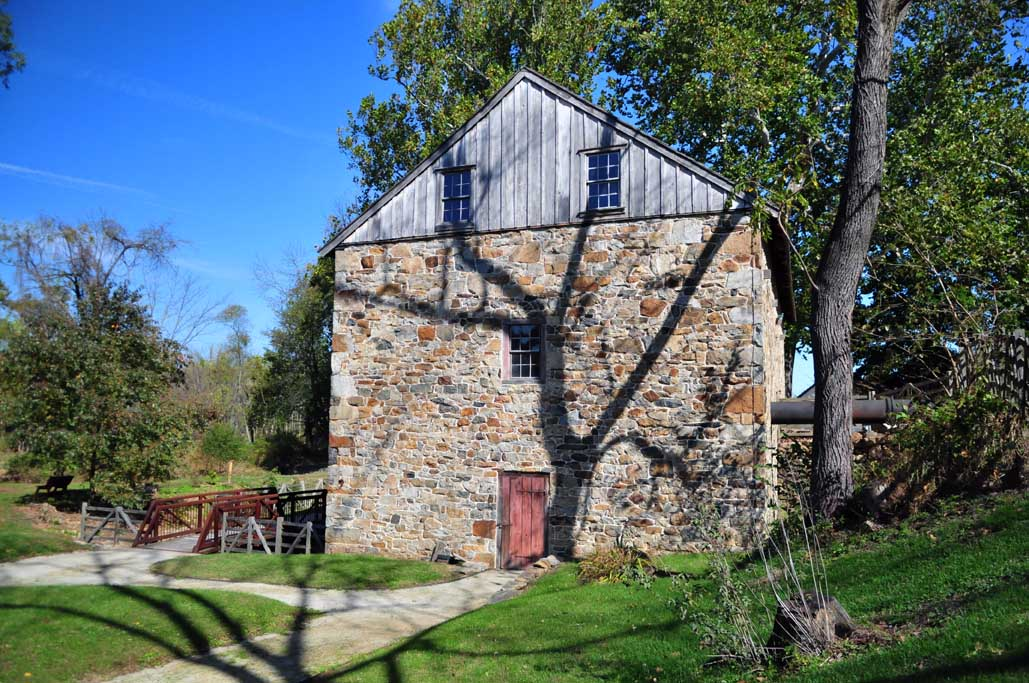
The Mill at Anselma, 2010.

The Mill at Anselma (a.k.a. Lightfoot Mill) is an archetypal small, 18th-century custom grain mill in Anselma, outside Chester Springs, Pennsylvania. It is probably the only surviving one in the United States with an intact colonial-era power transmission system. A custom grain mill typically ground cornmeal and flour only for local farmers, not for commercial distribution. It was designated a National Historic Landmark in 2005.

== History of the Mill at Anselma ==
Samuel Lightfoot built this custom grist mill in c. 1747 to mill flour for Chester Springs' early residents. During three centuries of operation, the Mill evolved to meet changing needs and became the center of the community of Anselma. The first of eight grist mills established in the Township of Pikeland, the Mill at Anselma was never the largest nor the most valuable. However, it provided a vital local flour milling service for early settlers living in Philadelphia's backcountry against the backdrop of a flourishing American grain economy in the late 18th century.

By the mid-19th century, Lightfoot's Mill supported Chester County's growing livestock and dairy economy by milling animal feed as well as flour under the ownership of John Oberholtzer. In 1872, the Pickering Valley Railroad connected Anselma's vibrant farming community with the markets of Philadelphia.

The Mill at Anselma was also home to the respected poet and social activist Sara Louisa Oberholtzer, who used her surroundings as a backdrop for her poems "At the Old Mill" and "Lost Music."

The Mill's final miller, Oliver E. Collins, and his family came to Anselma in 1919. During the Great Depression, the Collins family relied on their colonial-era grist mill to make a living. The family ran a saw mill and cider press, milled animal feed, and operated the Anselma Post Office from their home. Mr. Collins assembled a machine shop to create a repair service and sharpen lawn mower blades, and even cut hair for local residents. The mill remained active until 1982.

== Anselma's millers ==
1747–1812 Samuel Lightfoot, William Lightfoot, Thomas Lightfoot

1812–1820 Lewis Rees, James Benson

1820–1859 Rees Sheneman

1859–1886 John Oberholtzer

1886–1919 Allen H. Simmers

1919–1982 Oliver E. Collins

== Preserving Anselma for the future ==
Under the leadership of Samuel and Eleanor Morris, the French & Pickering Creeks Conservation Trust purchased the mill property from the estate of Oliver E. Collins in 1983. In 1999, the Mill at Anselma Preservation and Educational Trust was formed to complete the mill's restoration and create a historical attraction for the enjoyment and edification of schoolchildren, scholars, visitors, and the community.

Today, the Mill at Anselma connects visitors with America's rich industrial and agricultural past through tours and milling demonstrations. The Mill sells its own stoneground flour and cornmeal, and hosts a weekly farmer's market on its historic grounds. It was declared a National Historic Landmark in 2005. A Pennsylvania state historical marker was placed outside the mill building in 2007.

== Gallery ==
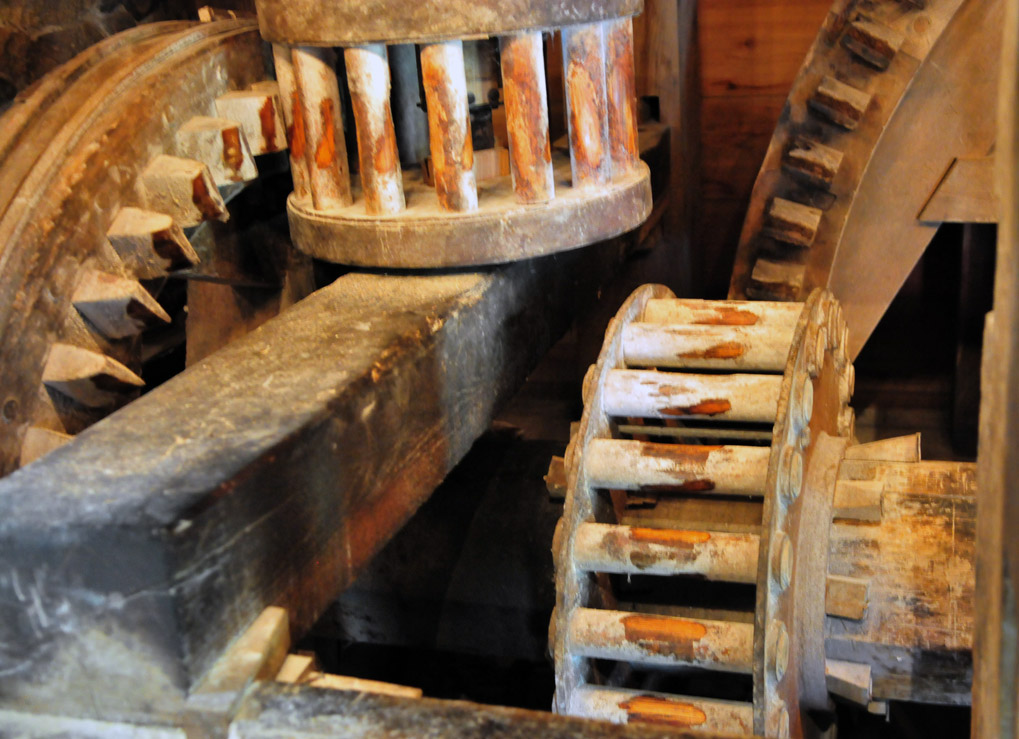
Portion of the drive train at the Mill at Anselma, 2010.

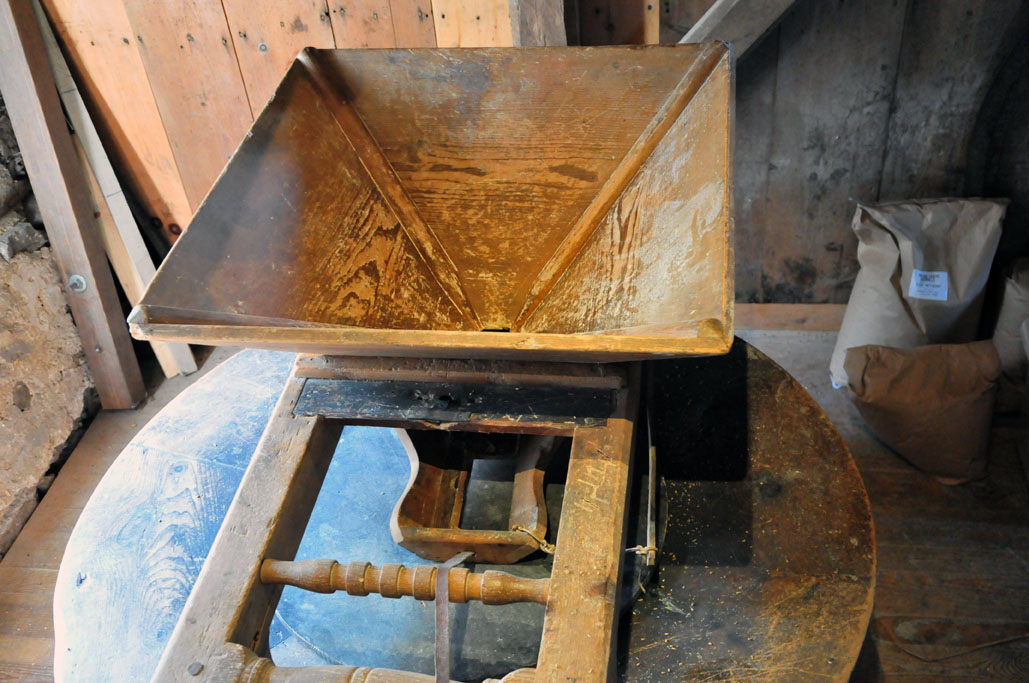
Hopper at the Mill at Anselma, 2010.

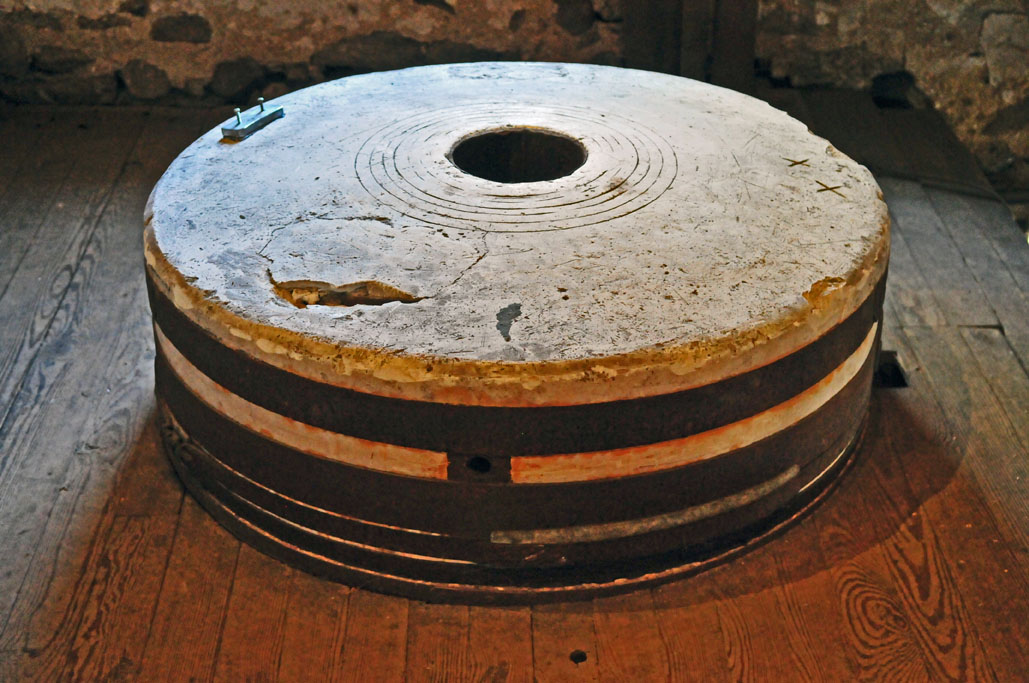
Millstone at the Mill at Anselma, 2010.

== See also ==
- William Lightfoot Price
