= West Pikeland Township, Pennsylvania =

Township in Pennsylvania, US

West Pikeland Township
- Township
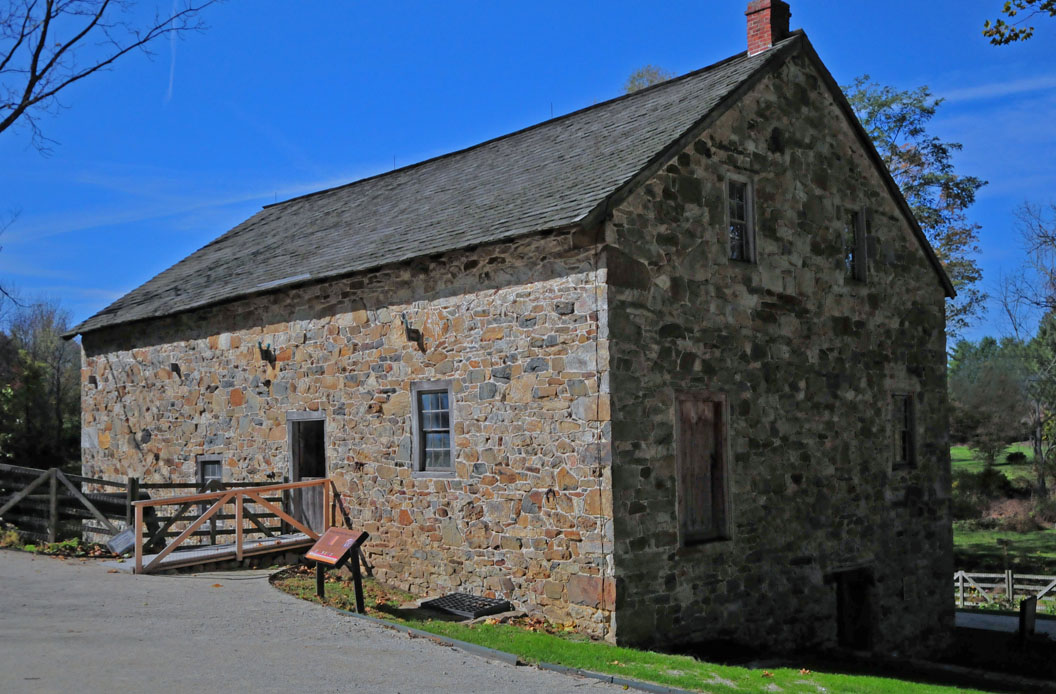
- Lightfoot Mill, National Historic Landmark

- Location in Chester County and the state of Pennsylvania.

- Location of Pennsylvania in the United States
- Coordinates: 40°05′25″N 75°37′20″W
- Country: United States
- State: Pennsylvania
- County: Chester

Area
  - Total: 9.96 sq mi (25.79 km^{2})
  - Land: 9.86 sq mi (25.55 km^{2})
  - Water: 0.093 sq mi (0.24 km^{2})
- Elevation: 374 ft (114 m)

Population (2010)
  - Total: 4,024
  - Estimate (2016): 4,083
  - Density: 413.8/sq mi (159.77/km^{2})
- Time zone: UTC-5 (EST)
  - Summer (DST): UTC-4 (EDT)
- Area code: 610
- FIPS code: 42-029-83832

West Pikeland Township is a township in Chester County, Pennsylvania, United States. The population was 4,024 at the 2010 census.

== History ==
The Chester Springs Historic District, Clinger-Moses Mill Complex, Fagley House, Ker-Feal, Lightfoot Mill, and Rice-Pennebecker Farm are listed on the National Register of Historic Places.

== Geography ==
According to the United States Census Bureau, the township has a total area of 10.0 square miles (26 km^{2}), of which 0.04 square miles (0.10 km^{2}), or 0.20%, is water.

== Demographics ==
Historical population
Census	Pop.	Note	%±
1930	592		—
1940	623		5.2%
1950	683		9.6%
1960	782		14.5%
1970	1,420		81.6%
1980	1,536		8.2%
1990	2,323		51.2%
2000	3,551		52.9%
2010	4,024		13.3%
2020	4,024		0.0%

At the 2010 census, the township was 93.2% non-Hispanic White, 0.8% Black or African American, 0.1% Native American, 2.7% Asian, and 0.7% were two or more races. 2.3% of the population were of Hispanic or Latino ancestry.

As of the census of 2000, there were 3,551 people, 1,214 households, and 1,012 families living in the township. The population density was 356.3 inhabitants per square mile (137.6/km^{2}). There were 1,240 housing units at an average density of 124.4 per square mile (48.0/km^{2}). The racial makeup of the township was 96.11% White, 1.24% African American, 0.03% Native American, 1.89% Asian, 0.37% from other races, and 0.37% from two or more races. Hispanic or Latino of any race were 1.01% of the population.

There were 1,214 households, out of which 45.1% had children under the age of 18 living with them, 77.8% were married couples living together, 3.9% had a female householder with no husband present, and 16.6% were non-families. 12.7% of all households were made up of individuals, and 2.9% had someone living alone who was 65 years of age or older. The average household size was 2.93 and the average family size was 3.22.

In the township the population was spread out, with 30.7% under the age of 18, 3.2% from 18 to 24, 29.5% from 25 to 44, 29.0% from 45 to 64, and 7.5% who were 65 years of age or older. The median age was 39 years. For every 100 females there were 97.9 males. For every 100 females age 18 and over, there were 95.7 males.

The median income for a household in the township was $105,322, and the median income for a family was $111,760. Males had a median income of $80,611 versus $41,765 for females. The per capita income for the township was $48,616. About 0.5% of families and 0.5% of the population were below the poverty line, including none of those under age 18 and 2.3% of those age 65 or over.

== Politics ==
While Chester County is becoming more liberal and Democratic as a whole, West Pikeland remains Republican. Even though Barack Obama was the first Democrat in 44 years to carry Chester County in a presidential election, West Pikeland remained Republican, with John McCain winning the township by about 54%-45%. This was significantly better than the 37% showing of John Kerry in 2004.The township government is governed by a Republican board. In 2012, Mitt Romney carried Chester County by a 0.2% margin over President Obama, and West Pikeland supported Romney by 60%-38% margin.

== Education ==
West Pikeland Township is within the Downingtown Area School District.

The township is divided between the district boundaries of Lionville Elementary School and Pickering Valley Elementary School. All of the township is assigned to Lionville Middle School and Downingtown East High School.

== Transportation ==
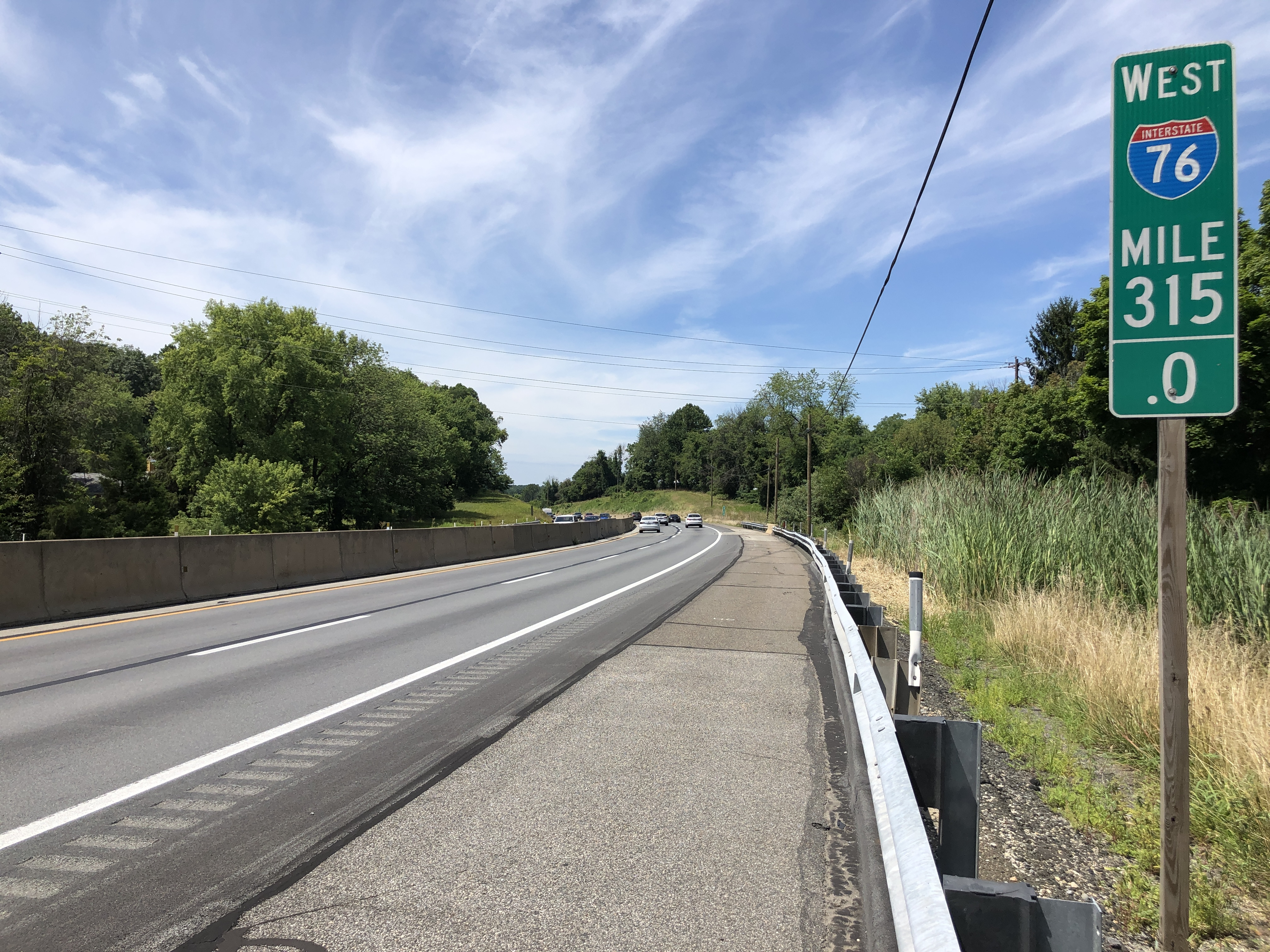
Pennsylvania Turnpike/I-76 westbound in West Pikeland Township

As of 2018, there were 41.67 miles (67.06 km) of public roads in West Pikeland Township, of which 1.10 miles (1.77 km) were maintained by the Pennsylvania Turnpike Commission (PTC), 14.13 miles (22.74 km) were maintained by the Pennsylvania Department of Transportation (PennDOT) and 26.44 miles (42.55 km) were maintained by the township.

The Pennsylvania Turnpike (I-76) is the most prominent road passing through West Pikeland Township, but the nearest interchange is in neighboring Uwchlan Township. Pennsylvania Route 113 follows Kimberton Road and Pike Springs Road along a southwest-northeast alignment through the center of the township. Pennsylvania Route 401 follows Conestoga Road along a northwest-southeast alignment across southern and western portions of the township.

== See also ==
- Kimberton Fire Company
