= Exton (surname) =

Exton is a surname, and may refer to:

- Clive Exton (1930–2007), British television and film screenwriter
- Harold Exton, mathematician
- Hugh Exton (1864–1955), South African photographer
- John Exton (lawyer) (c. 1600–c. 1665), English admiralty lawyer
- John Exton (composer) (1933–2009), British composer of classical music
- John Exton (priest) (died 1430), Canon of Windsor
- Nicholas Exton (died 1402), Lord Mayor of London from 1386 to 1388
- Rodney Exton (1927–1999), English cricketer
- Thomas Exton (1631–1688), English lawyer, Member of Parliament and Master of Trinity Hall, Cambridge

== See also ==
- Hexton
- Reston (surname)
- Sexton (surname)
- Wexton
