= Reston =

Reston may refer to:

== Places ==
- Reston, Florida, an unincorporated community in Florida, United States
- Reston, Lincolnshire, a parish in England
- Reston, Manitoba, a small community in southwestern Manitoba, Canada
- Reston Scar, a fell in Cumbria, England
- Reston, Scottish Borders, a village in the southeast of Scotland
  - Reston railway station
- Reston, Virginia, a census-designated place in Fairfax County, Virginia, United States

== Other uses ==
- Reston (surname)
- Reston foam, a 3M surgical dressing; see auricular splint
- Reston Group, a Silurian to Devonian lithostratigraphic group
- Reston Publishing, a defunct imprint of Prentice Hall
- Reston virus, a form of Ebolavirus

== See also ==
- Reston Parkway (disambiguation)
- Reston Station, a mixed-use development and railway station in Reston, Virginia
