= Exton =

Exton may refer to:

== People ==
- Exton (surname)
- Exton (given name), for example writer L. E. Modesitt Jr.

== Places ==
- Exton, Somerset, UK
- Exton, Devon, UK
  - Exton railway station, in Exton, Devon, England
- Exton, Hampshire, UK
- Exton, Rutland, UK
- Exton, Pennsylvania
  - Exton Square Mall, a shopping mall in Exton, Pennsylvania
  - Exton station (Pennsylvania), a train station in Exton, Pennsylvania
- Exton, Tasmania, Australia
