= Exton, Pennsylvania =

Unincorporated community in Pennsylvania, US

Exton
- Census-designated place
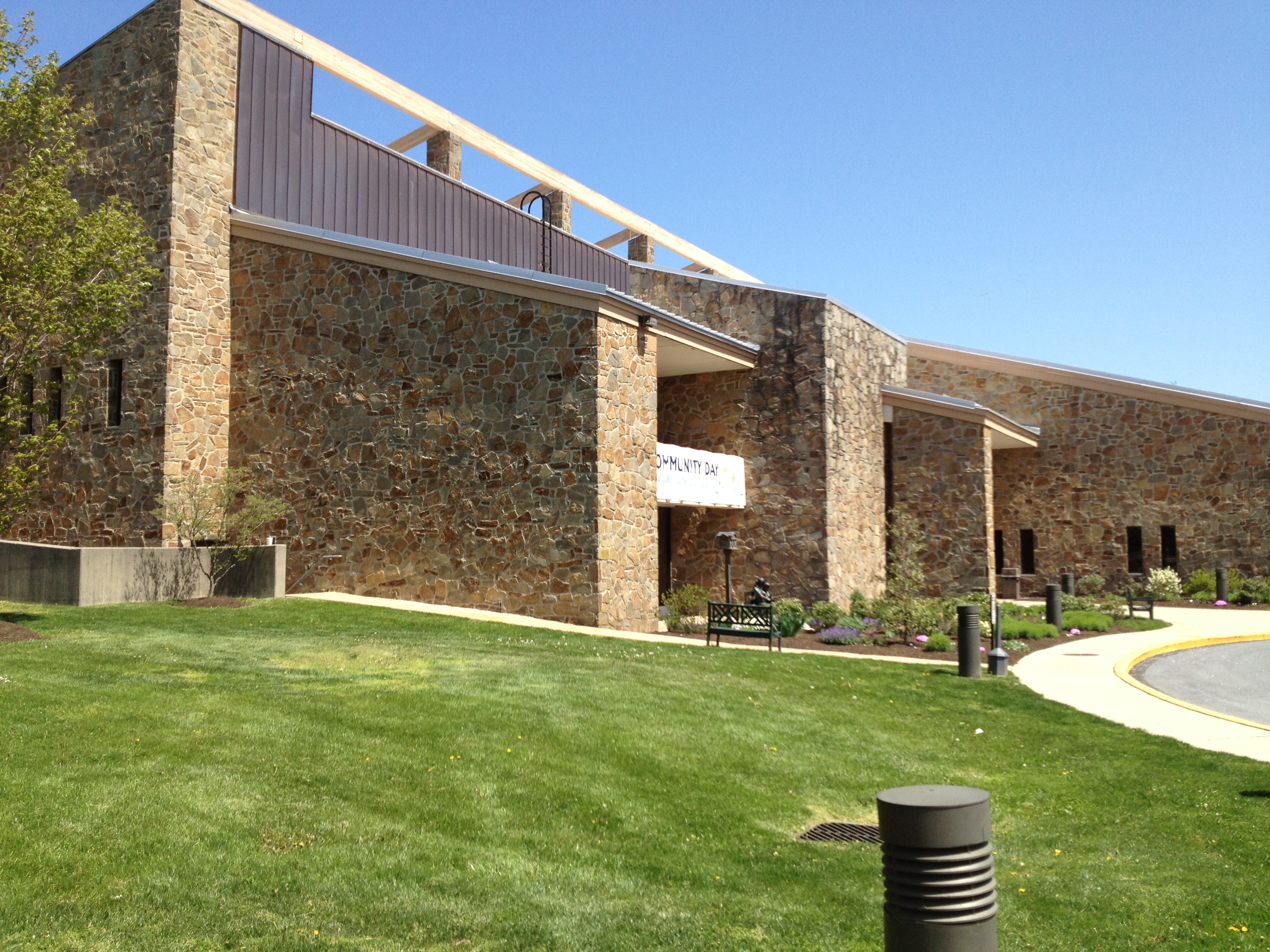
- Chester County Library at Exton

- Location in Chester County and the state of Pennsylvania.

- Location of Exton in Pennsylvania Exton (the United States)
- Coordinates: 40°01′59″N 75°37′40″W
- Country: United States
- State: Pennsylvania
- County: Chester
- Township: West Whiteland

Area
  - Total: 3.15 sq mi (8.17 km^{2})
  - Land: 3.13 sq mi (8.10 km^{2})
  - Water: 0.027 sq mi (0.07 km^{2})
- Elevation: 312 ft (95 m)

Population (2020)
  - Total: 5,622
  - Density: 1,798.0/sq mi (694.21/km^{2})
- Time zone: UTC−5 (EST)
  - Summer (DST): UTC−4 (EDT)
- ZIP Codes: 19341, 19353
- Area codes: 610 and 484
- FIPS code: 42-24440

Exton is a census-designated place (CDP) in West Whiteland Township, Chester County, Pennsylvania, United States. Located within the Philadelphia metropolitan area, its population was 5,622 at the 2020 census.

Exton is situated at the intersection of two major highways, U.S. Route 30 and Pennsylvania Route 100, and is home to several retail centers, including the Exton Square Mall.

== History ==
Exton lies at the intersection of U.S. Route 30 (Lincoln Highway) and Pennsylvania Route 100 (Pottstown Pike). Beginning in the late 18th century, the Lancaster Road became a major transportation route between Philadelphia and the west, while what is now Route 100 was a regional north–south route to Pottstown. A theory exists that Exton was named as the "X" on the map, denoting this intersection, though more likely the village was named after one of the several Extons in the United Kingdom.

In the late 1940s, Exton became home to the Newcomen Society of the United States. The campus of the learned society was built overlooking farmland on Newcomen Road, and featured offices, a printing shop, library and museum, guest houses, a chapel and a belltower with a carillon. The Newcomen Society (since dissolved) sold the property in the late 1990s, but its campus remains an Exton landmark serving as the headquarters of another business.

== Geography ==
According to the U.S. Census Bureau, the CDP has a total area of 3.2 square miles (8.3 km^{2}), all land.

=== Climate ===
According to the Köppen Climate Classification system, Exton has a hot-summer humid continental climate, abbreviated "Dfa" on climate maps.

== Demographics ==
Historical population
Census	Pop.	Note	%±
2000	4,267		—
2010	4,842		13.5%
2020	5,622		16.1%

As of the 2020 U.S. census, the racial makeup of the CDP was 62.5% White non-Hispanic, 3.8% Black of African American, 31.5% Asian, 0.9% two or more races, and 1.3% were Hispanic or Latino.

As of the census of 2000, there were 4,267 people, 2,053 households, and 1,096 families residing in the CDP. The population density was 1,341.6 inhabitants per square mile (518.0/km^{2}). There were 2,128 housing units at an average density of 669.1 per square mile (258.3/km^{2}). The racial makeup of the CDP was 88.07% White, 4.05% African American, 0.14% Native American, 6.05% Asian, 0.02% Pacific Islander, 0.54% from other races, and 1.12% from two or more races. Hispanic or Latino of any race were 1.87% of the population.

There were 2,053 households, out of which 20.9% had children under the age of 18 living with them, 45.4% were married couples living together, 5.8% had a female householder with no husband present, and 46.6% were non-families. Of all households 37.5% were made up of individuals, and 7.9% had someone living alone who was 65 years of age or older. The average household size was 2.05 and the average family size was 2.75.

In the CDP, the age distribution was: 17.9% under the age of 18, 5.9% from 18 to 24, 43.3% from 25 to 44, 20.6% from 45 to 64, and 12.3% who were 65 years of age or older. The median age was 35 years. For every 100 females, there were 92.6 males. For every 100 females age 18 and over, there were 90.8 males.

The median income for a household in the CDP was $68,240, and the median income for a family was $81,499. Males had a median income of $65,789 versus $42,778 for females. The per capita income for the CDP was $38,589. About 1.5% of families and 2.9% of the population were below the poverty line, including 1.1% of those under age 18 and 10.1% of those age 65 or over.

== Economy ==
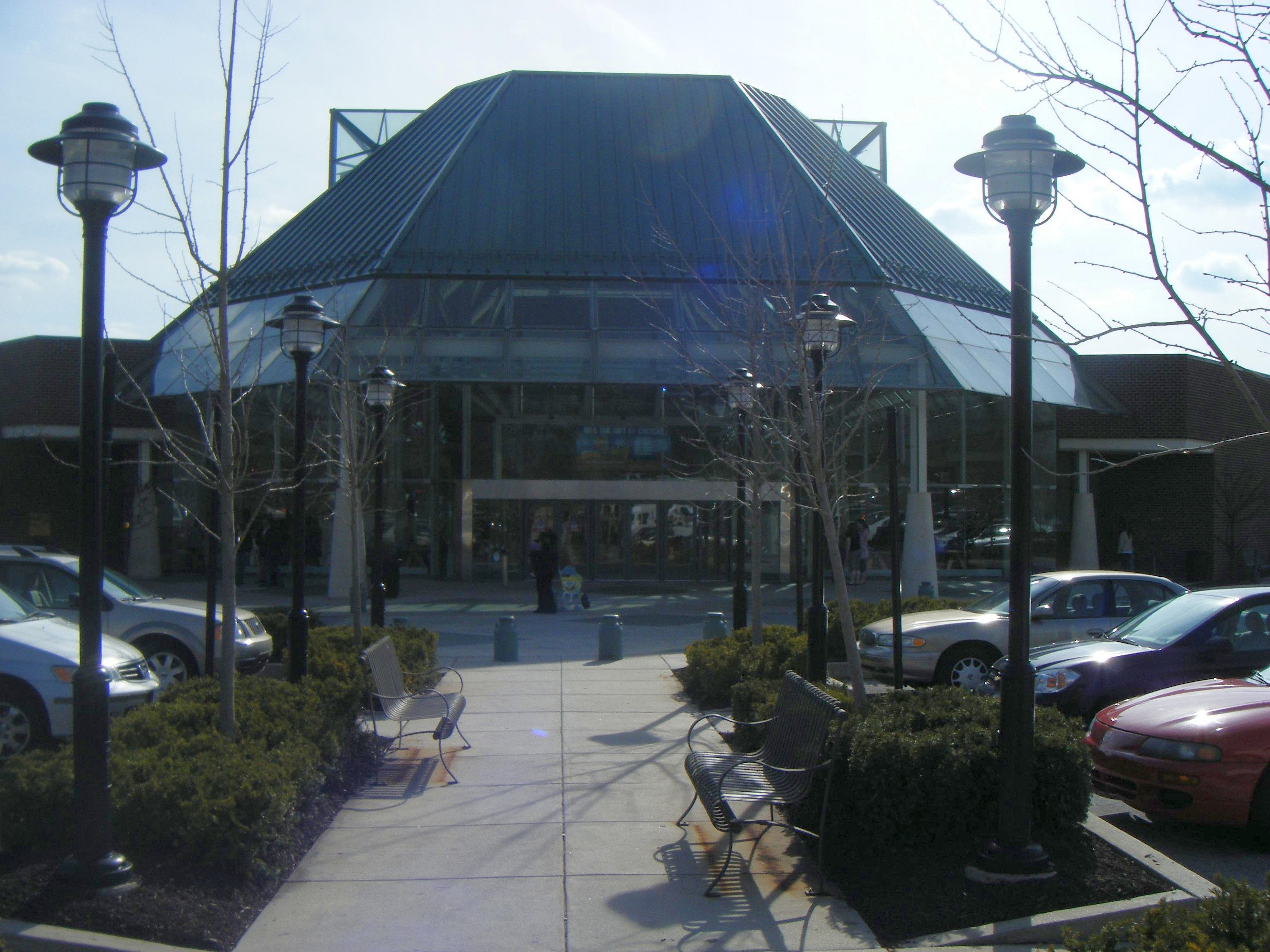
Exton Square Mall

As of 2014, Exton had an unemployment rate of 3.80% with a job growth rate of 1.44%. The future job growth was predicted to be 39.10% over the next ten years. The opening of the Exton Square Mall led to rapid growth in West Whiteland Township, with the population increasing from 7,900 in 1973 to over 16,000 by 2000. Since the opening, many shopping centers and office parks have been built in the township. Following the opening of the mall, the West Whiteland Township Police Department was created to patrol the township as the demand from the mall would be too much for the Pennsylvania State Police to handle. When the Exton Square Mall first opened, several stores in downtown West Chester closed. In 2011, the Exton Square Mall saw sales per square foot of $332.

West Pharmaceutical Services, a designer and manufacturer of injectable pharmaceutical packaging and delivery systems is based in Exton.

== Arts and culture ==
The main location of the Chester County Library System is accessible from the mall. The building was dedicated to honor Congressman Paul B. Dague in 1971. In 1982, the library in Exton received a National Association of Counties Award for its Library Literacy Program, the first in Pennsylvania to handle 30,000 illiterate and 15,000 non-English speaking residents.

== Education ==
=== Primary and secondary schools ===
All residents of the Exton census-designated place, entirely in West Whiteland Township, reside in the West Chester Area School District.

Half of Exton is zoned to Exton Elementary, located in Exton, while the other half is zoned to Mary C. Howse Elementary School. Half of the CDP is zoned to Fugett Middle School and West Chester East High School, while the other half is zoned to Peirce Middle School and West Chester Henderson High School.

Downingtown Area School District serves some areas with Exton postal addresses, and Downingtown High School East Campus and Lionville Middle School have Exton addresses.

Other schools in the Exton area are the Catholic parish school Saints Philip and James of the Roman Catholic Archdiocese of Philadelphia, and the Church Farm School, which are near but not in the CDP.

=== Colleges and universities ===
Both Widener University and the Delaware County Community College operate in Exton in the Whiteland Business Park.

=== Public libraries ===
Chester County Library and District Center, the flagship library of the Chester County Library System, is in Exton.

== Infrastructure ==
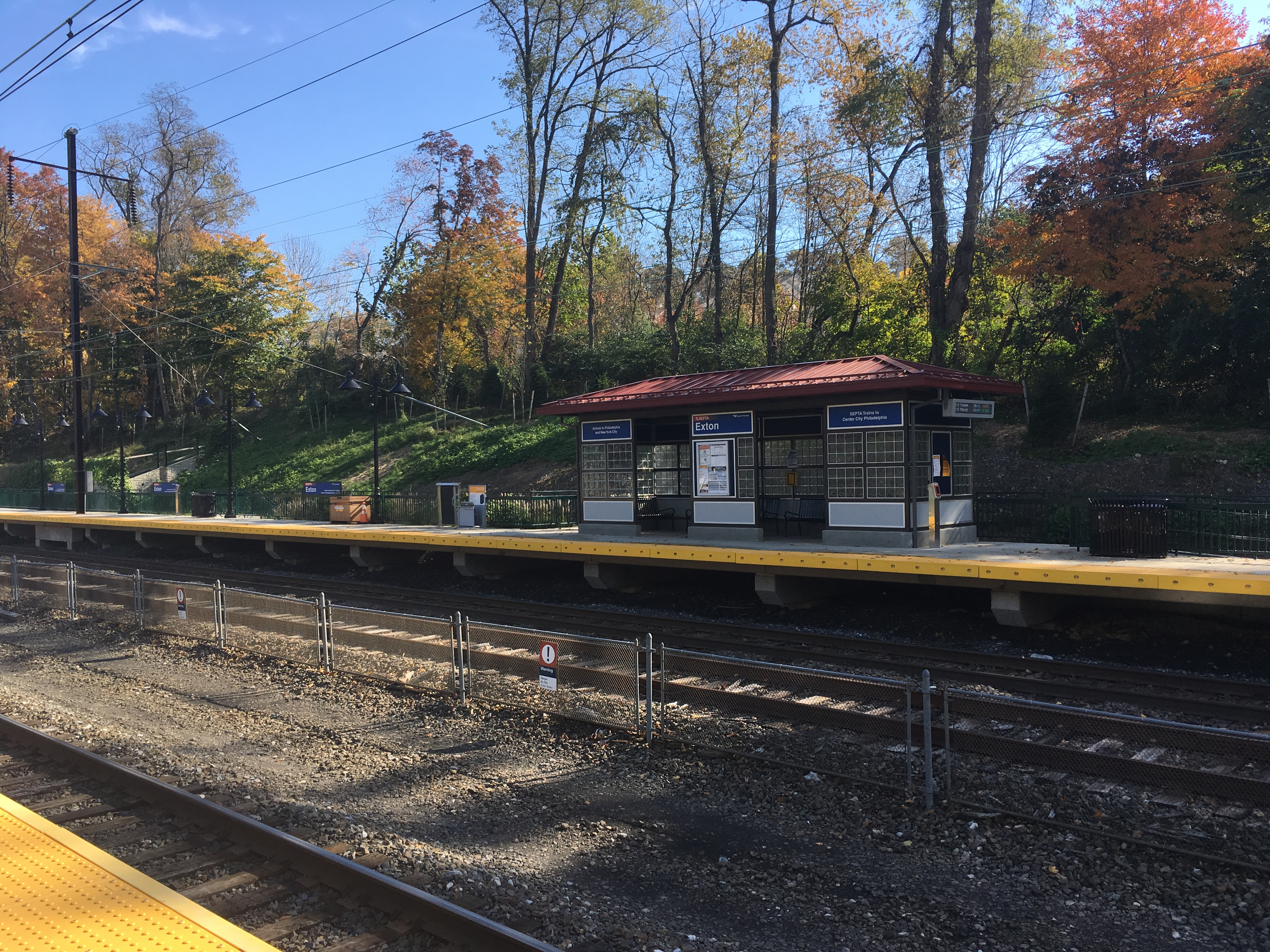
Exton station, which serves SEPTA and Amtrak trains

=== Transportation ===
Exton is generally served by a network of highways, including U.S. Route 202, U.S. Route 30, and PA 100, which connect with Philadelphia, Lancaster, and Wilmington.

=== Transit ===
Exton is served by the SEPTA Regional Rail at the Whitford and Exton train stations and the Exton Transportation Center located inside the Exton Square Mall complex.

The Exton Transportation Center is a SEPTA bus terminal located on the eastern side of the Exton Square Mall. The station serves as a hub for transfers between SEPTA Routes 135 and 204 with service to West Chester, Coatesville, Paoli and Eagleview.

Rail service at Exton station is provided by Amtrak's Keystone Service and Pennsylvanian lines, as well as SEPTA's Paoli/Thorndale Line. The station is located close to the former Whiteland station served by the former Pennsylvania Railroad.

== Notable people ==
- Kyle Lauletta, New Jersey Generals quarterback
- Matt Ryan, NFL quarterback
- Kerr Smith, actor

== In popular culture ==
- Philadelphia-based rock band The Hooters filmed the music video for their 1985 hit single "And We Danced" at a former drive-in theater in Exton.

== Gallery ==
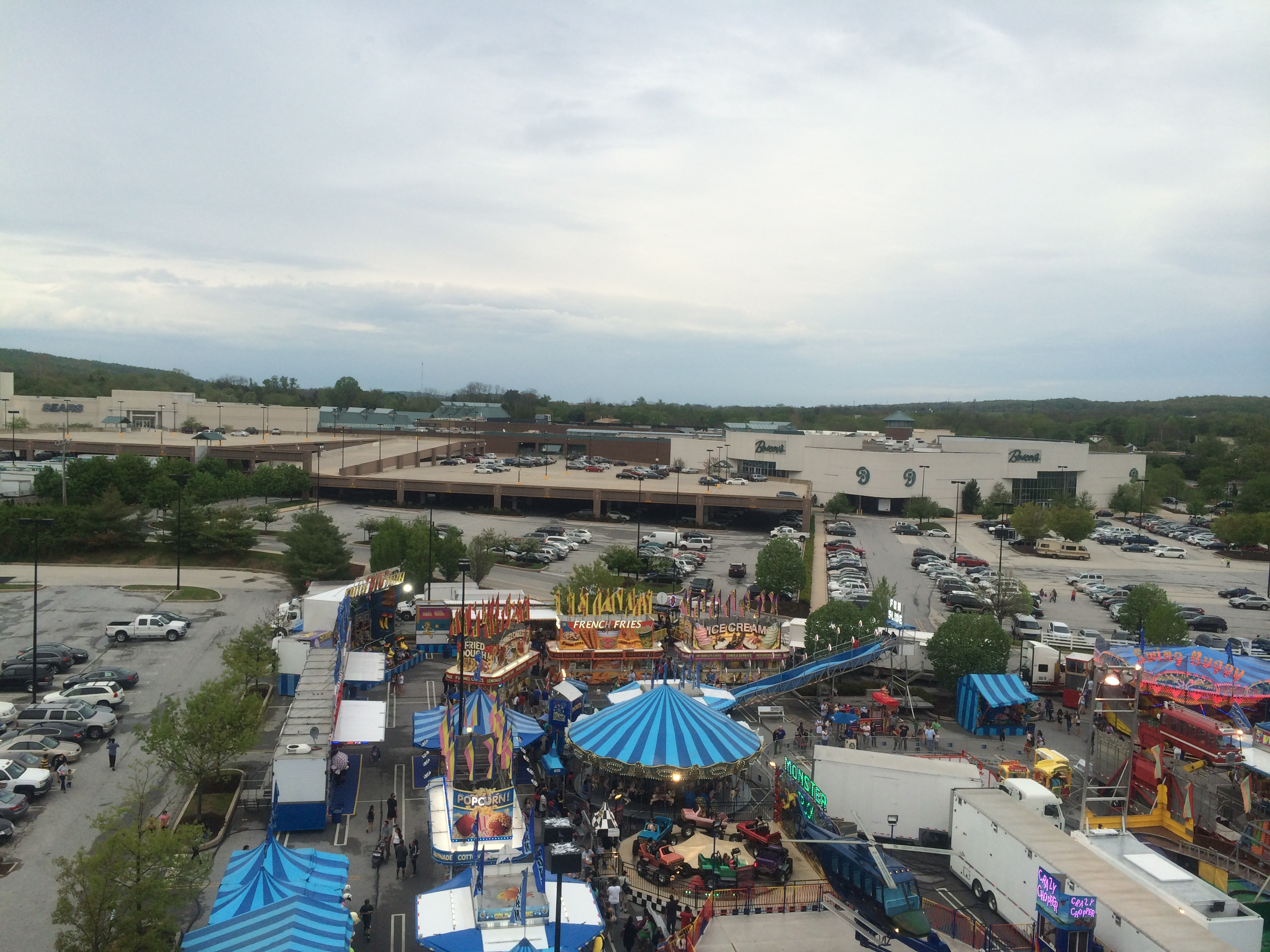
A carnival at the Exton Square Mall

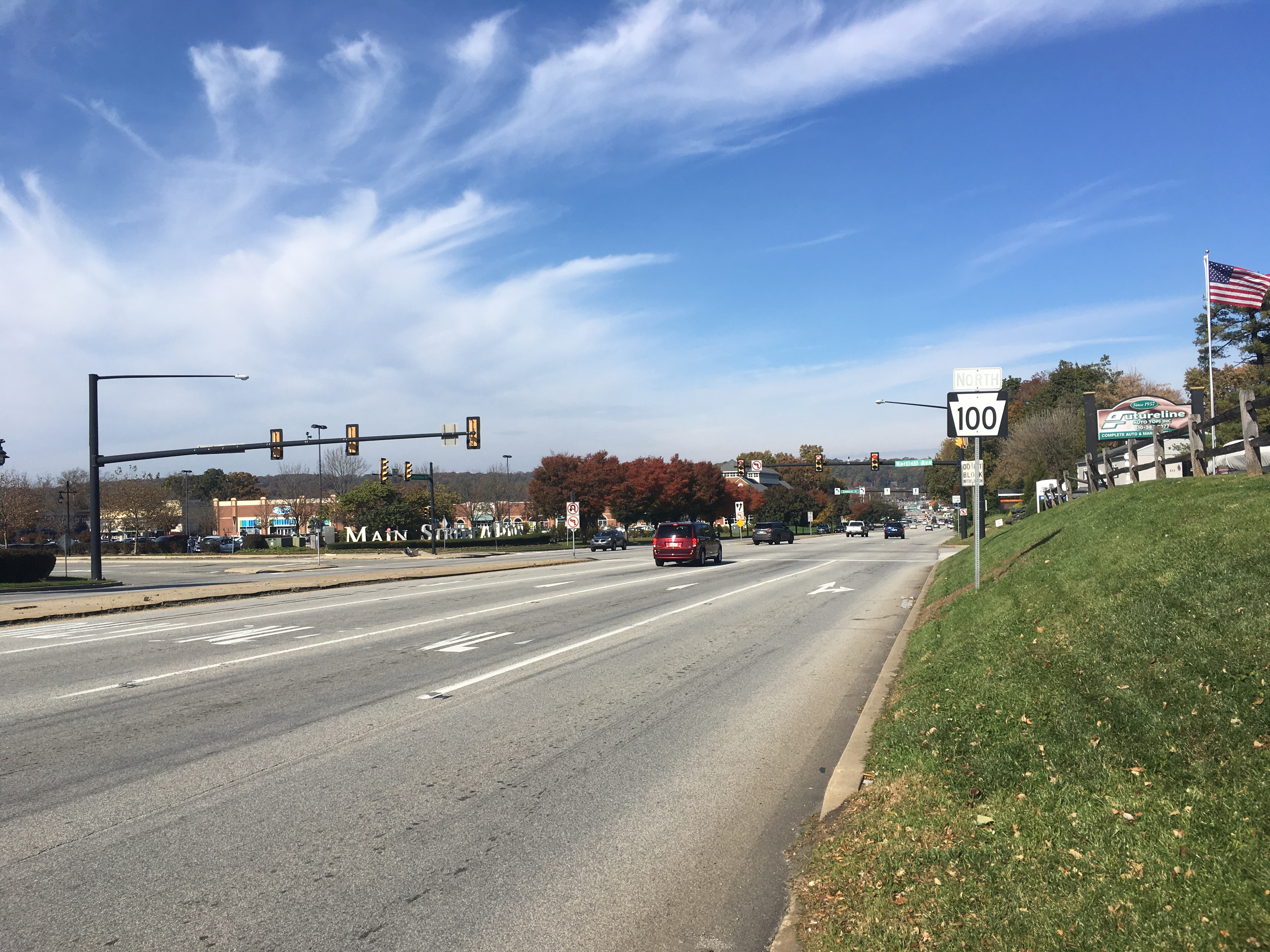
Northbound PA 100 past the interchange with U.S. Route 30

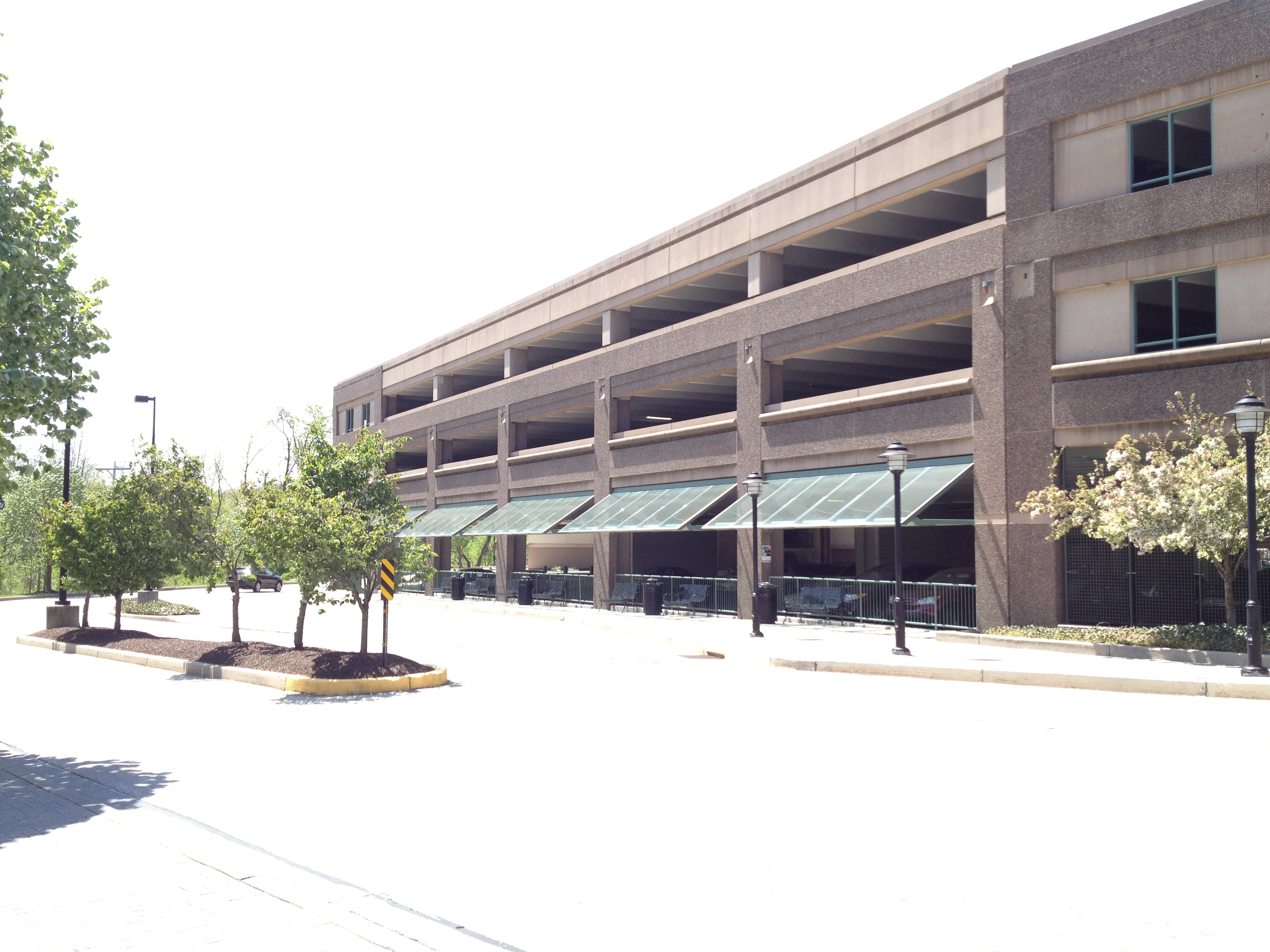
Exton Transportation Center located beneath the garage near the library
