= Exton Square Mall =

Defunct mall in Chester County, Pennsylvania, U.S.

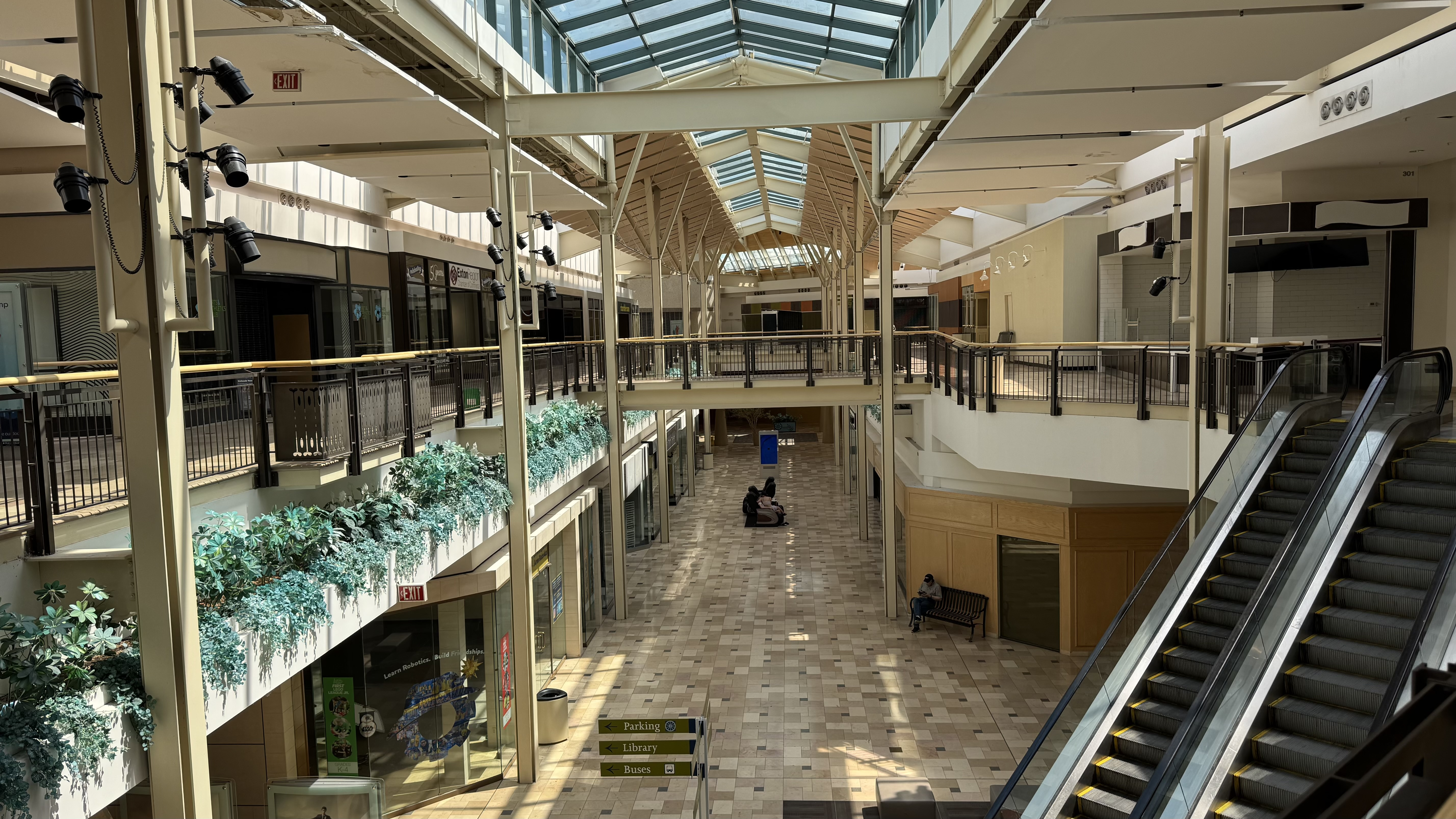
- East corridor (June 2026)
- Location: Exton, Pennsylvania, United States
- Coordinates: 40.0314°N 75.6236°W
- Address: 260 Exton Square Parkway
- Opened: March 15, 1973; 53 years ago
- Renovated: December 1997 – May 3, 2000
- Closed: June 30, 2026; 4 months ago
- Developer: The Rouse Company
- Manager: Abrams Realty & Development
- Owner: Abrams Realty & Development
- Architect: Katzman Associates; Aaron Garfinkel & Associates
- Num. of stores: approx. 150 (at peak)
- Num. of anchor tenants: 4 (at peak; 2 remaining)
- Floor area: 1,086,859 square feet (100,000 m^{2})
- Floors: 2 (1 in northern half only)
- Parking: Parking lot and parking garage
- Public transit: SEPTA bus: 135, 204 at the Exton Transportation Center
- Website: Official website at the Wayback Machine (April 2025 archive)

The Exton Square Mall is a defunct mall located in the community of Exton in West Whiteland Township, Pennsylvania, roughly 25 miles northwest of Philadelphia. The mall was originally developed by the Rouse Company and opened in March 1973. The mall's name was due to the building's square shape, with Strawbridge's (later Macy's), the original anchor, located in the center.

The mall underwent a major renovation and expansion from 1997 to 2000, adding three anchors and a food court to the four corners of the mall, along with a second level to the southern half of the building. However, beginning in the 2010s, vacancies within the mall began to rise due to general declining mall traffic and ongoing competition with the larger King of Prussia Mall located 14 miles (23 km) away. By 2023, the facility was cited among lists of dead malls in Pennsylvania. The mall permanently closed on June 30, 2026, with the exception of remaining anchors and medical offices on site.

Abrams Realty & Development, the current owner of the mall property as of March 2025, has proposed redevelopment of the site, though these plans have been stalled in October 2025. In November 2026, Chester County overruled the township's rejection of the redevelopment plans, meaning the mall is legally expected to be demolished.

== Overview ==
The former Exton Square Mall is located in Exton, a census-designated place in West Whiteland Township, Pennsylvania, at the northeast corner of the intersection between east–west U.S. Route 30 Business and north–south Pennsylvania Route 100. The intersection is known as the "crossroads of Chester County" due to the heavy daily usage of both routes. The mall was also located near the U.S. Route 30 bypass of Exton, the U.S. Route 202 expressway, and the Downingtown Interchange of the Pennsylvania Turnpike. SEPTA bus routes 135 and 204 stop at the mall at the Exton Transportation Center, providing access to West Chester, Coatesville, Eagleview, and Paoli.

The mall was also located near Exton station, which is served by the Paoli/Thorndale Line of SEPTA Regional Rail and Amtrak's Keystone Service and Pennsylvanian. The Exton Square Mall has a market area that covers most of Chester County along with the western portion of Delaware County, the western portion of Montgomery County near Pottstown, the extreme southern portion of Berks County, and the extreme eastern portion of Lancaster County. The mall perimeter also contains several facilities, including the Chester County Library and a post office.

== History ==
=== 1973: Grand opening ===
The Exton Square Mall was developed by Exton Square, Inc., a subsidiary of the Rouse Company and opened its doors on March 15, 1973, designed by Katzman Associates and Aaron Garfinkel & Associates. The mall had one anchor store, Strawbridge & Clothier, surrounded by a ring of smaller stores. It was also home to Pennsylvania's first Chick-fil-A restaurant, which opened along with the mall. In developing the Exton Square Mall, The Rouse Company was responsible for restoring the Zook House, a historic 18th century farmhouse that existed at the site of the mall, into its management office.

=== 1990–2014: Additional anchors ===
By the 1990s, the mall, which had no major renovations, was starting to show its age. Additionally, developers had been looking to build competing malls in neighboring Uwchlan and East Caln townships. As a response, in 1992, The Rouse Company proposed adding two anchor stores. In 1995, plans were modified to not only add three new anchor stores, but also double the size of the mall as a whole. The Rouse Company purchased 12 acres (4.9 ha) near the mall to be used for the expansion. Boscov's and JCPenney signed leases to open locations at the Exton Square Mall in 1996, with Sears following in 1997. In September 1997, West Whiteland Township supervisors approved the expansion of the Exton Square Mall.

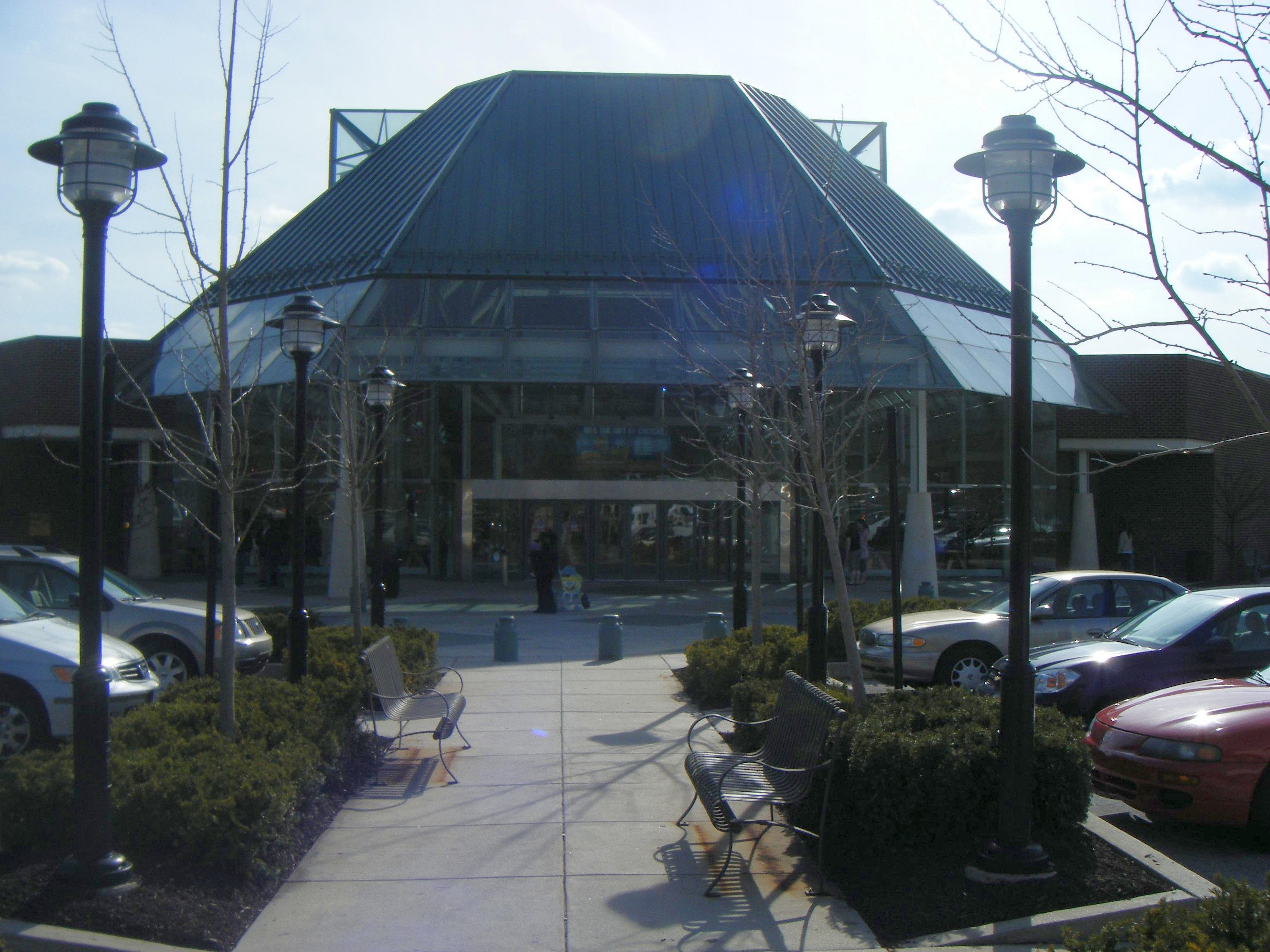
The entrance to the food court in March 2008. The food court was constructed in the late 1990s as part of the major renovation and expansion project.

Groundbreaking for the expansion took place in December 1997. In 1998, the Zook House, which had served as the mall management office, was relocated to make way for the new Boscov's store. The expansion added three new anchor stores, a new food court, two parking garages, and a completed second level. The expanded mall was designed to reflect the agricultural heritage of Chester County. In addition to expanding the mall, The Rouse Company improved US 30 Bus, and PA 100 near the mall at a cost of $3 million. Boscov's, Sears, and the new food court opened in September 1999. Construction concluded on May 3, 2000 with the opening of JCPenney and 48 new stores; a grand reopening was held to commemorate this. The expansion of the mall cost $125 million, and the number of stores in the mall increased from 95 to 150, and retail space expanded from 435,000 square feet (40,413 m^{2}) to 980,000 square feet (91,045 m^{2}). The expansion turned the Exton Square Mall into the first regional mall in Chester County. In 2003, The Rouse Co. sold the Exton Square Mall, along with the Cherry Hill Mall, Echelon Mall, Moorestown Mall, Plymouth Meeting Mall, and The Gallery at Market East to the Pennsylvania Real Estate Investment Trust (PREIT) for $548 million.

In July 2005, Federated Department Stores announced that they would purchase May Department Stores, the owners of Strawbridge's, and planned to convert several Strawbridge's locations to Macy's, including the store at Exton Square Mall. This rebranding was completed in 2006. In January 2014, Main Line Health opened a 32,000-square-foot (2,973 m^{2}) healthcare facility on the first floor.

=== 2014–2026: Decline and closure ===
On January 15, 2014, it was announced that the JCPenney store would be closing as part of a plan to close 33 locations nationwide. With the closure of JCPenney, PREIT announced plans to reposition the Exton Square Mall. As part of the redevelopment, PREIT would take over the Kmart outparcel in 2016 and replace it with Whole Foods Market, which opened in 2018. In addition, the Japanese-based Round1 Bowling & Arcade opened on the first floor of the former JCPenney on December 9, 2016.

In late March 2017, the Sears Auto Center closed, and the Sears anchor store closed in September 2019. The space would later be temporarily used as a COVID-19 vaccination clinic, announced on April 29, 2021. On January 9, 2025, it was announced that Macy's would be closing in March of that year as part of a plan to close 66 stores nationwide. This left Boscov's as the last traditional department store anchor at the mall, while Round1 continues to occupy the first level of the former JCPenney.

Through the beginning of the 2020s, high-profile tenants such as CharlotteRusse, Zumiez, and H&M departed from the mall, while others including LensCrafters, Banana Republic, and Saladworks moved to Main Street at Exton, a nearby open-air shopping mall. After the closure of Chick-fil-A and India Corner in 2026, the food court became entirely vacant.

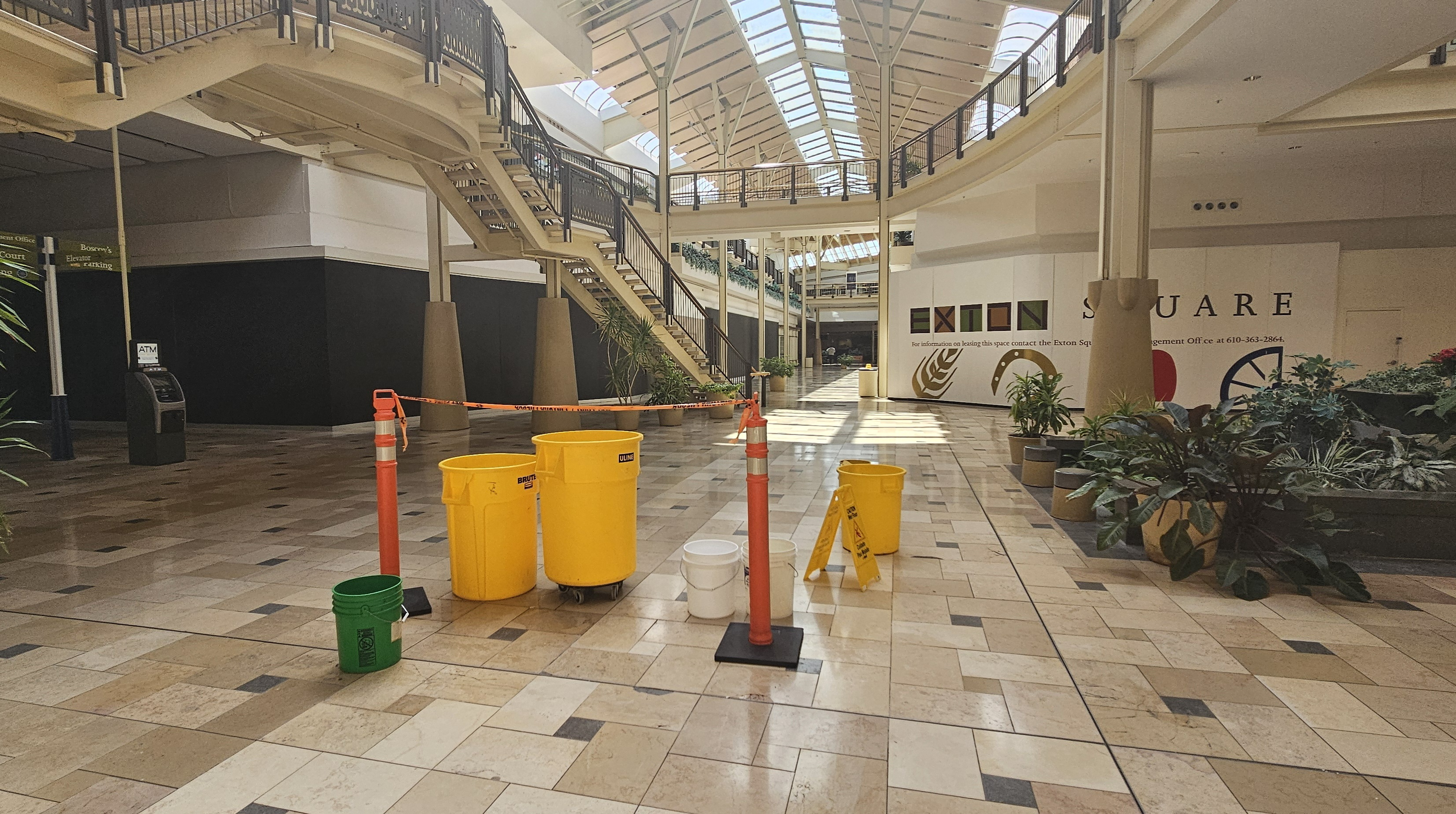
In its final years, buckets were placed throughout the mall amid roof leaks

By August 2024, the mall building had been experiencing several roof leaks and a broken HVAC system. On June 25, 2026, Abrams Realty announced that the mall would permanently close on June 30, though access to Boscov's, Round1, and the Main Line Health offices will remain. In an article by The Philadelphia Inquirer, Abrams revealed that "operating the interior of the property has become untenable" as a result of "deteriorating conditions and rising utility costs". Many of the spaces that were still occupied at the time of the mall's closing were used by non-traditional tenants such as medical offices, a chess club, an art studio and gallery, and a chamber of commerce office.

=== Redevelopment ===
On March 15, 2022, PREIT announced that it would sell the Exton Square Mall to raise money to pay down their debt. A sale to the Brandywine Realty Trust was in place, but subsequently fell through for unknown reasons. PREIT eventually sold the property in March 2025 to Abrams Realty & Development for $34.25 million. After the closure of Macy's in 2025, Abrams had planned to demolish the mall at the end of that year and redevelop the property into the Exton Town Centre, featuring more than 600 apartments and townhomes along with shops, restaurants, fitness, entertainment, office space and health care. The plan was noted for its similarities to the nearby King of Prussia Town Center. Only the Boscov's building and parking garages would remain, with the Round1 (former JCPenney) building remaining but being converted entirely into a Main Line Health medical space.

The West Whiteland Township board initially pushed for approval of the proposal in August 2025; however, it was then rejected in late October 2025, citing density, fears that the sewer system cannot handle the large number of buildings, and traffic concerns. In response, Abrams sued the township, arguing that the rejection was a "speed bump" and asserting that the redevelopment plan meets zoning requirements.

On November 13, 2026, Judge Sarah Black of Chester County overruled the township's initial rejection of Abrams Realty's master plans, clearing a major legal hurdle for the project.

== Economic impact ==
The opening of the Exton Square Mall helped spur rapid growth in West Whiteland Township, with the population increasing from 7,900 in 1973 to over 16,000 by 2000. Since the opening, many shopping centers, office parks, residential developments, and apartments have been built throughout the township. Following the opening of the mall, the West Whiteland Township Police Department was created to patrol the township as the demand from the mall would be too much for the Pennsylvania State Police to handle. When the Exton Square Mall first opened, several stores in downtown West Chester closed. In 2011, the Exton Square Mall saw sales per square foot of $332.

== In popular culture ==
On September 10, 2015, director Kevin Smith announced that the Exton Square Mall would be used in the filming of MallBrats, the sequel to his 1995 film Mallrats. MallBrats was originally intended to be filmed at the Granite Run Mall, but the plan fell through due to that mall's impending redevelopment. In February 2017, plans for filming MallBrats were cancelled.

== Gallery ==
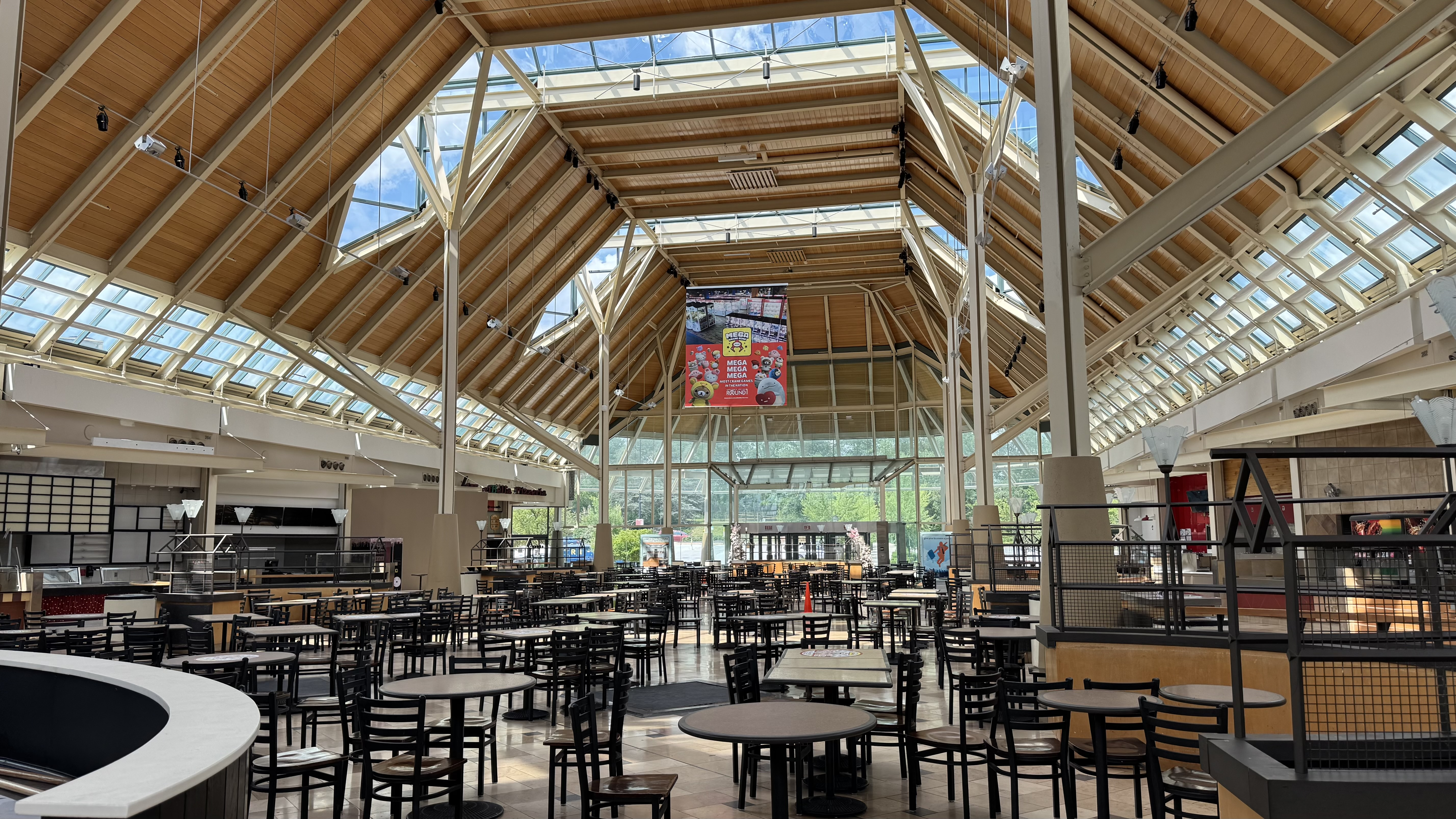
Food court (June 2026)

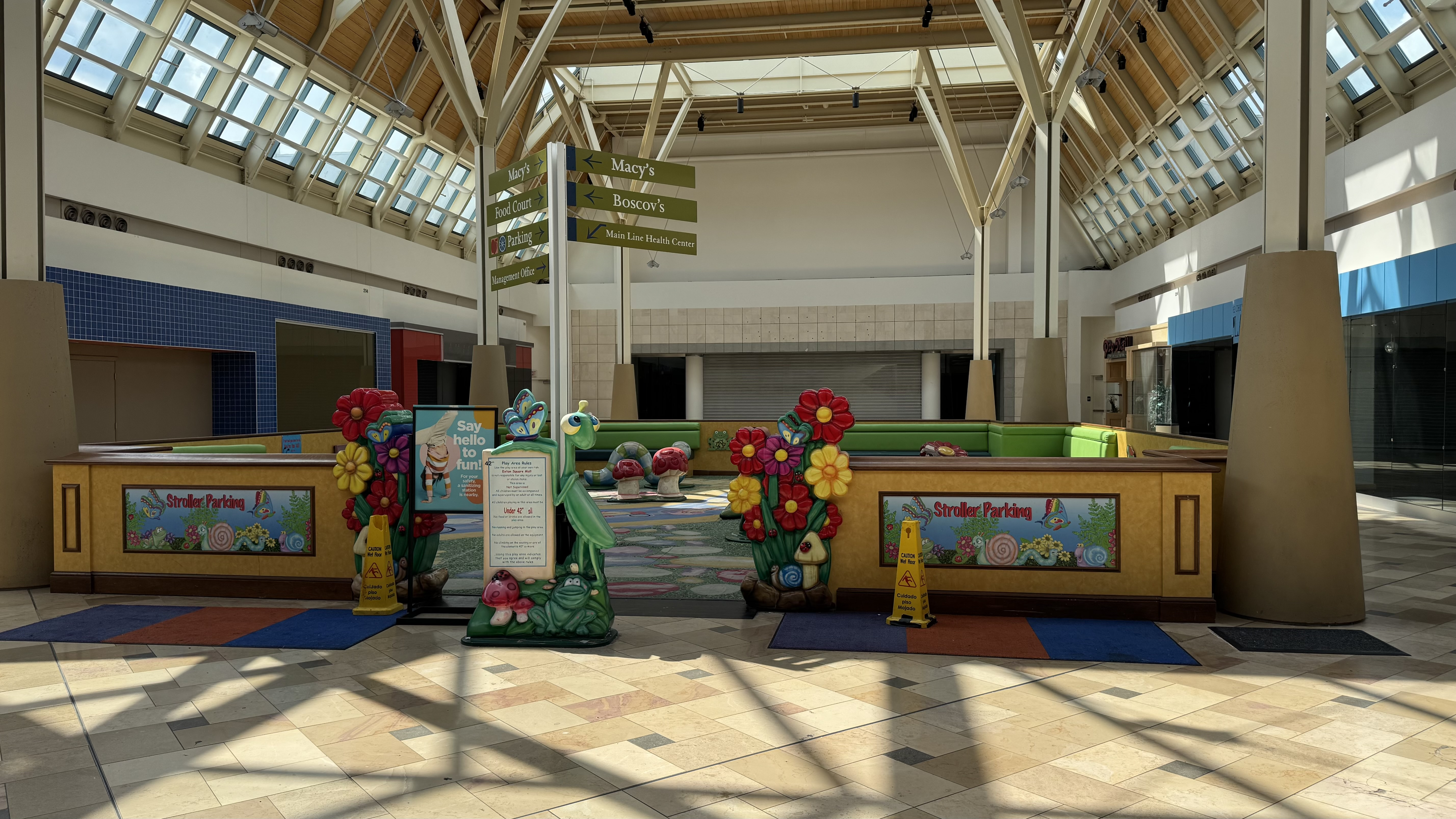
Children's play area in front of the former Sears (June 2026)

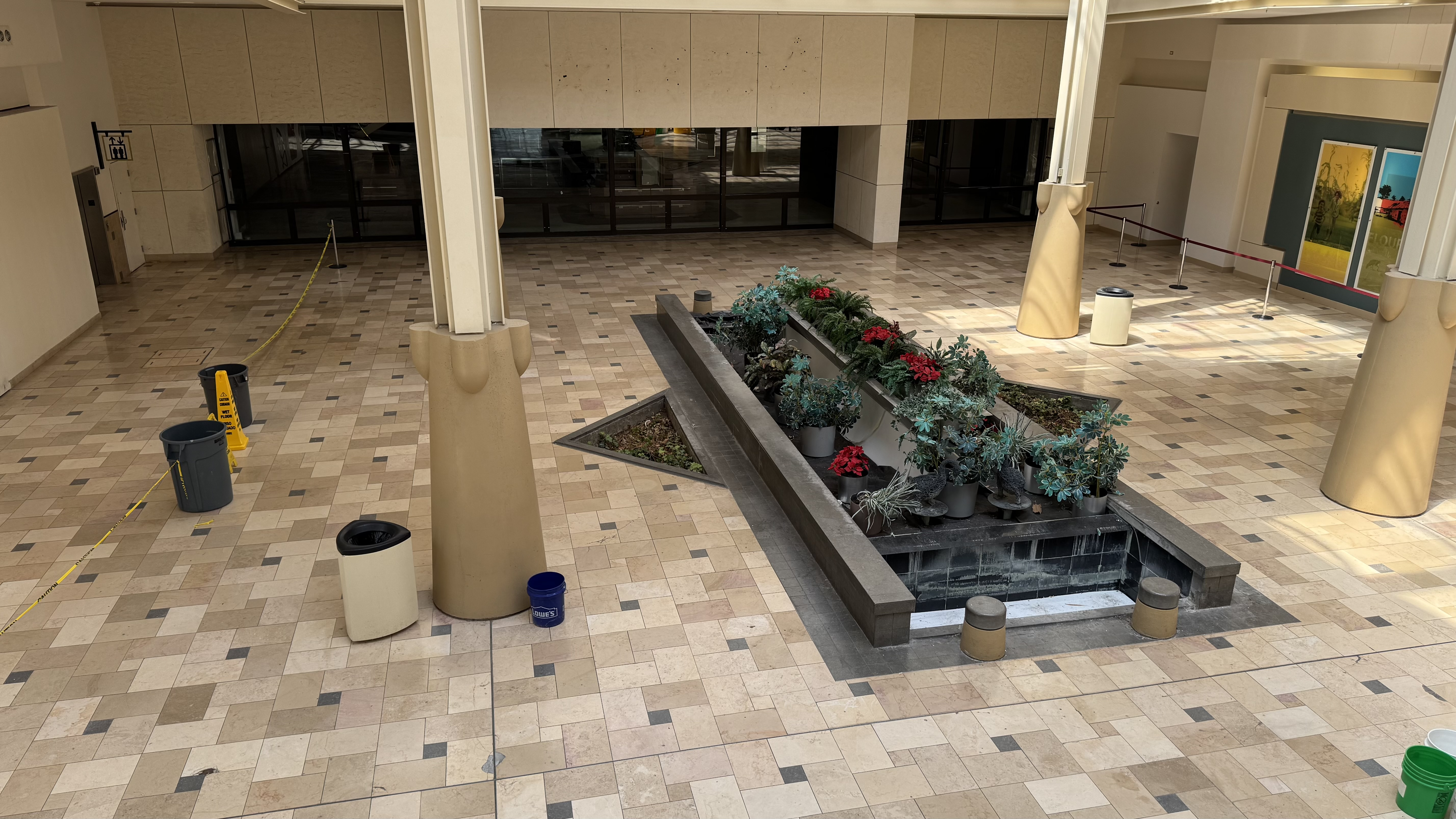
Water fountain in front of the former Macy's (June 2026)

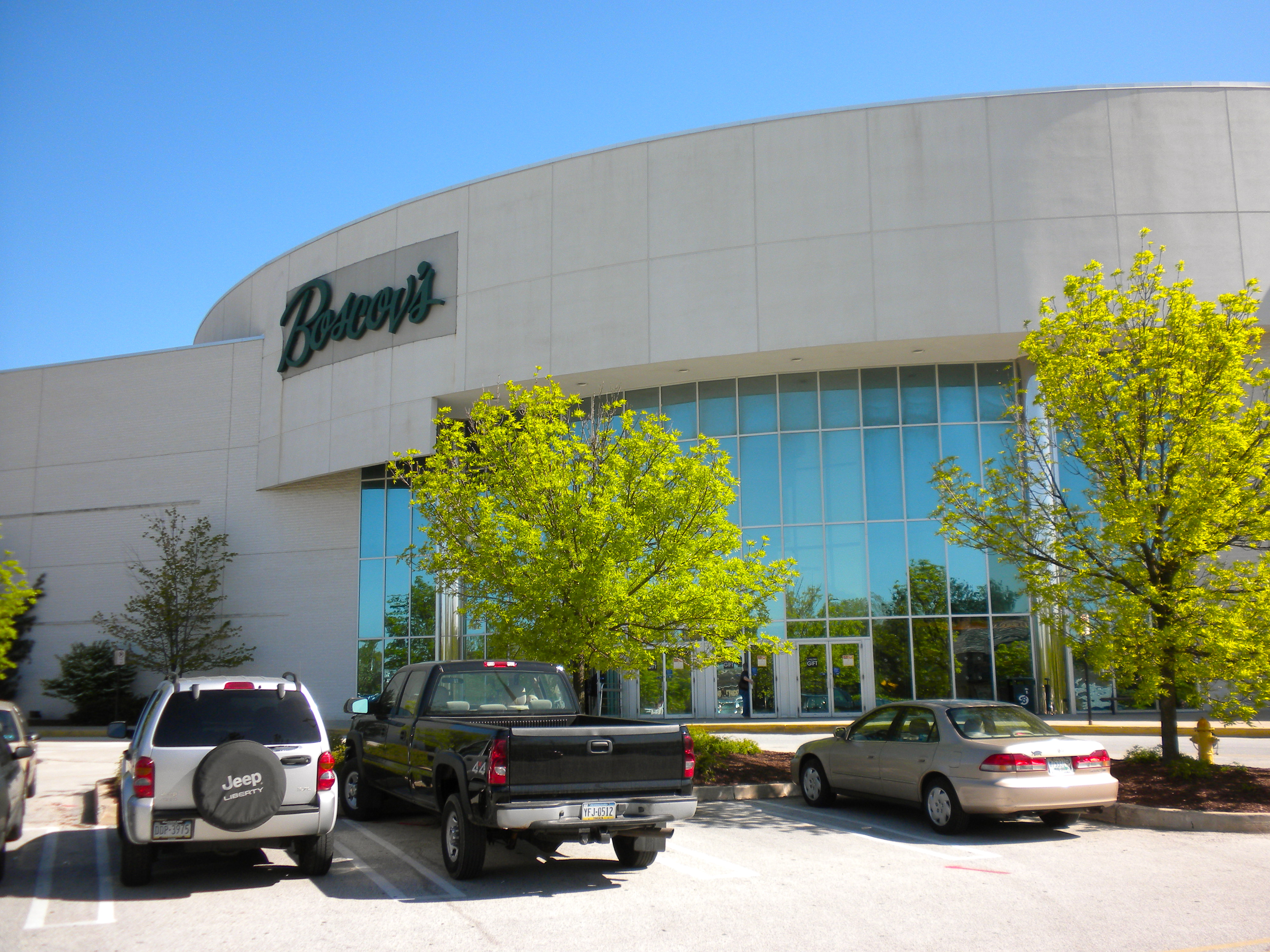
Main entrance to Boscov's (April 2010)

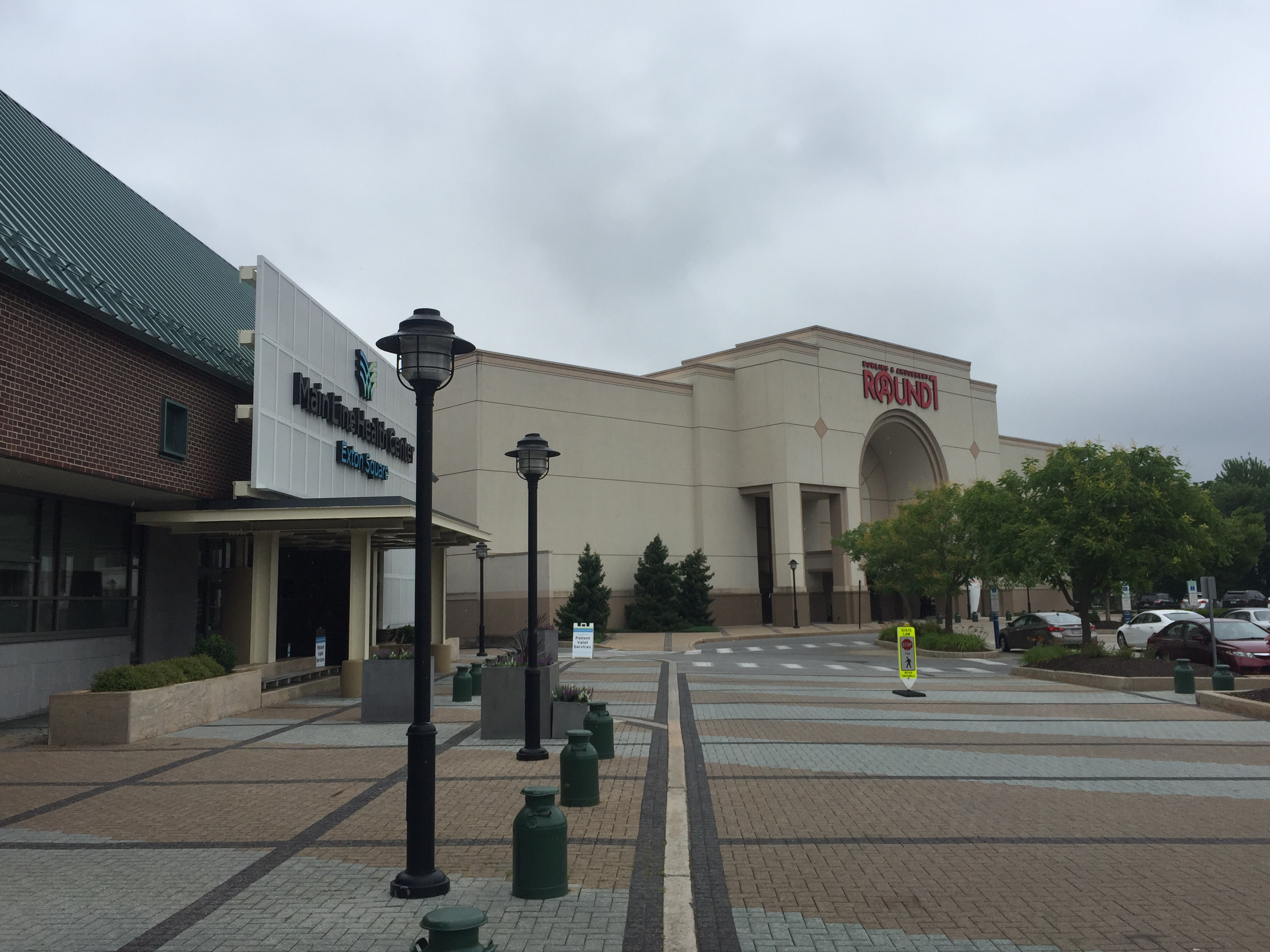
Round1 Bowling & Arcade and Main Line Health occupy the area around the former JCPenney

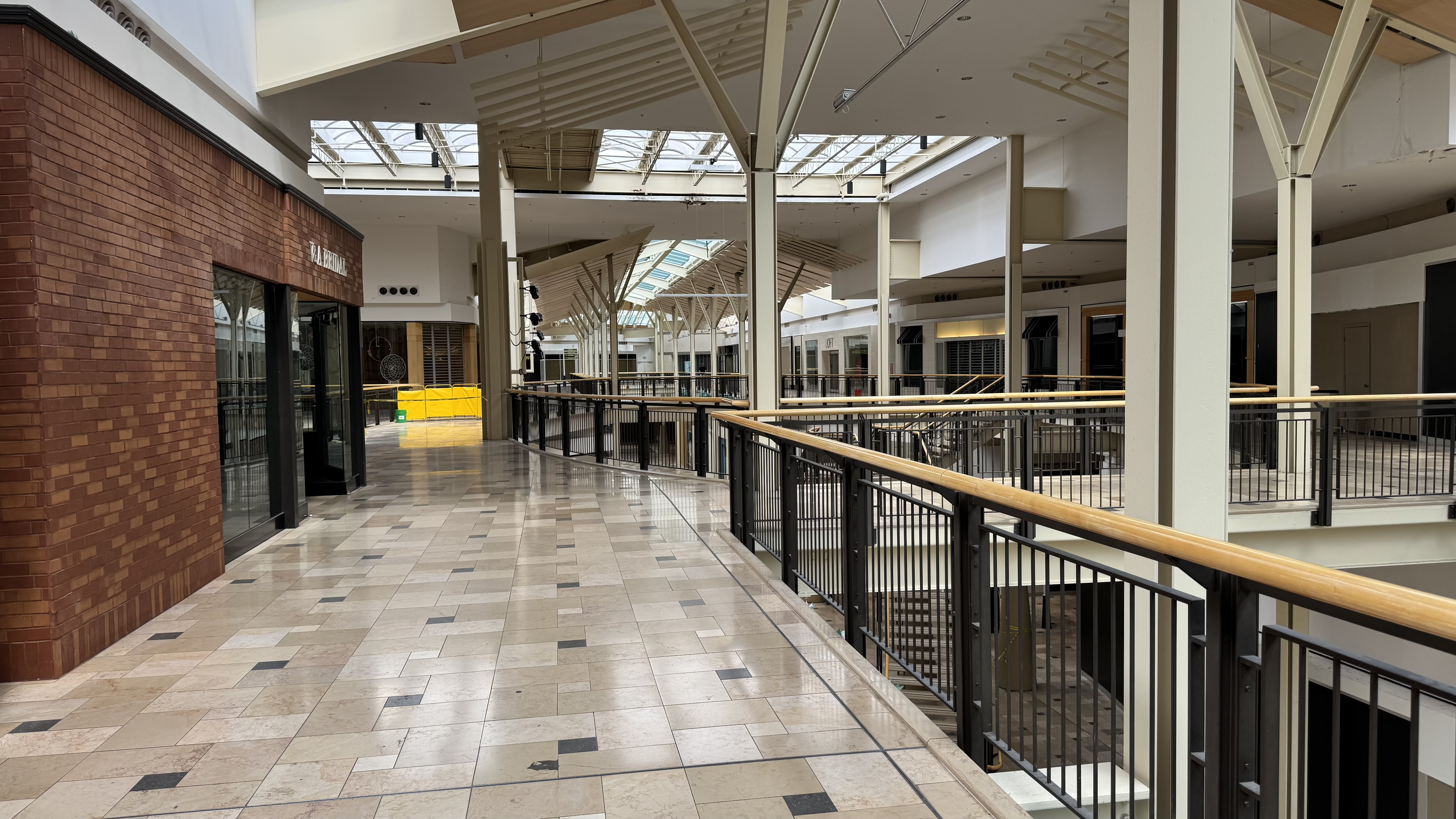
South corridor (June 2026)

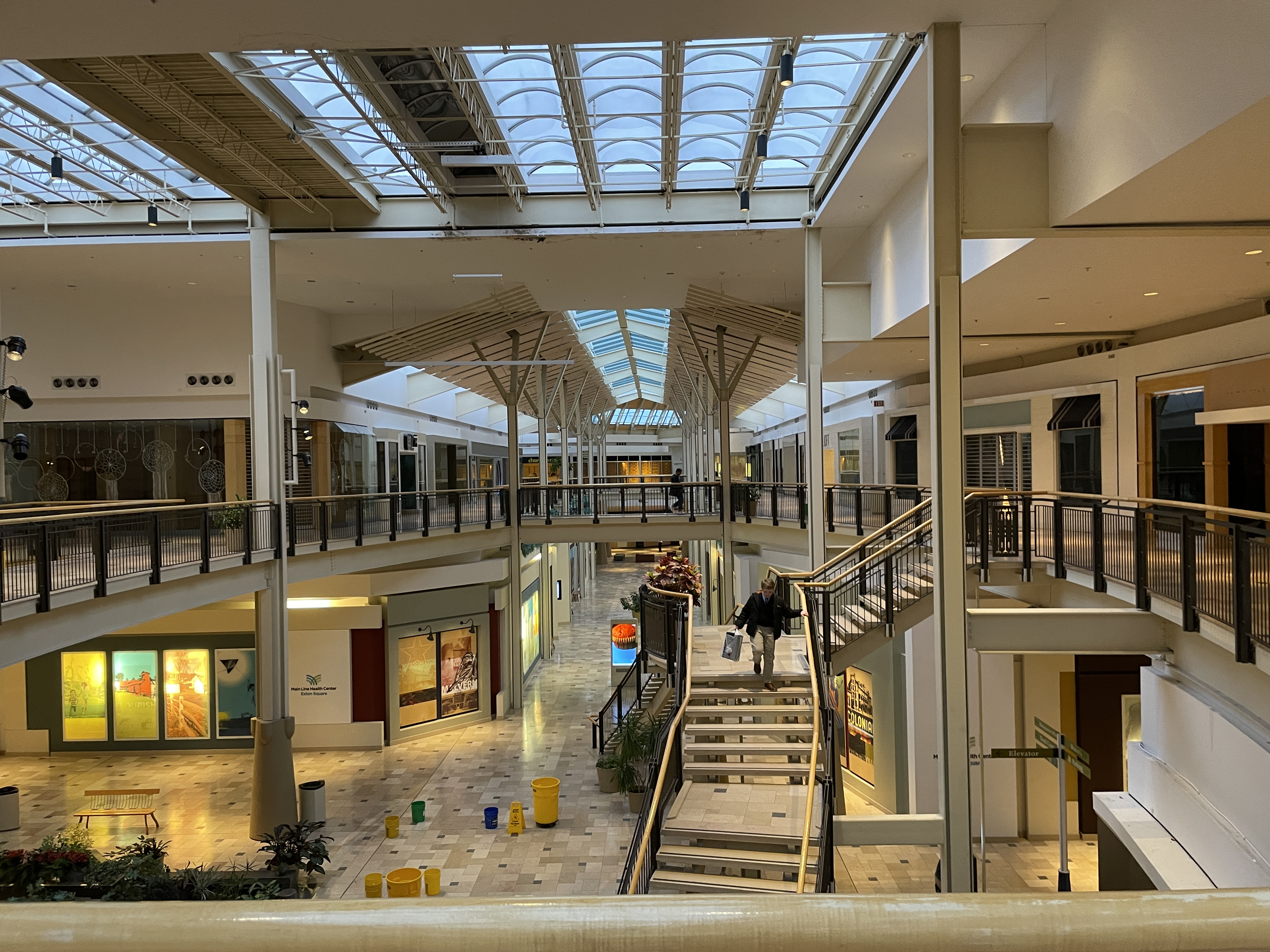
Second floor as viewed from the south end of Macy's (March 2024)
