= Chester County Library System =

Library system in Chester County, Pennsylvania, US

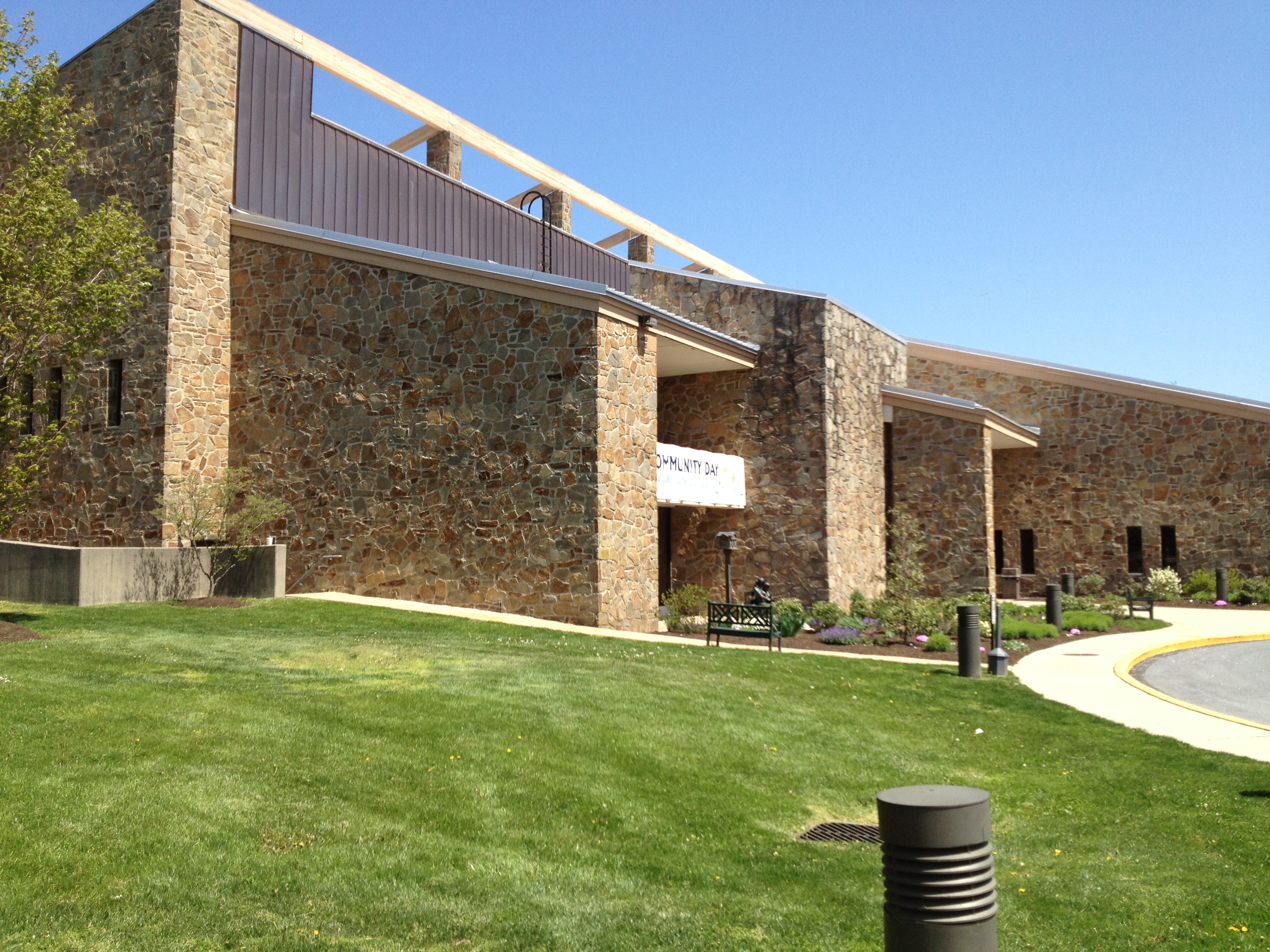
- 40.032081°N 75.620793°W
- Location: Chester County, Pennsylvania
- Established: 1965; 61 years ago
- Branches: 17

Other information
- Website: http://www.ccls.org/

The Chester County Library System (CCLS) is a library system serving Chester County in the U.S. state of Pennsylvania. Organized in 1965, the CCLS is a federated system composed of a District Center Library in Exton and seventeen member libraries. The system provides materials and information for life, work and pleasure.

== History ==
The library system has its history starting in West Chester, Pennsylvania where it was once housed in a new county building on West Market Street and New Street, replacing the old Chester County Prison situated in the same location only three years earlier in 1959.

The county building was dedicated to honor Congressman Paul Dague in 1971. In 1980, the Chester County Library moved its flagship library to its current location in Exton (next to the Exton Square Mall). In 1982, the library in Exton received a National Association of Counties Award for its Library Literacy Program, the first in the U.S. state of Pennsylvania handling 30,000 illiterate and 15,000 non-English speaking residents.

== Libraries ==
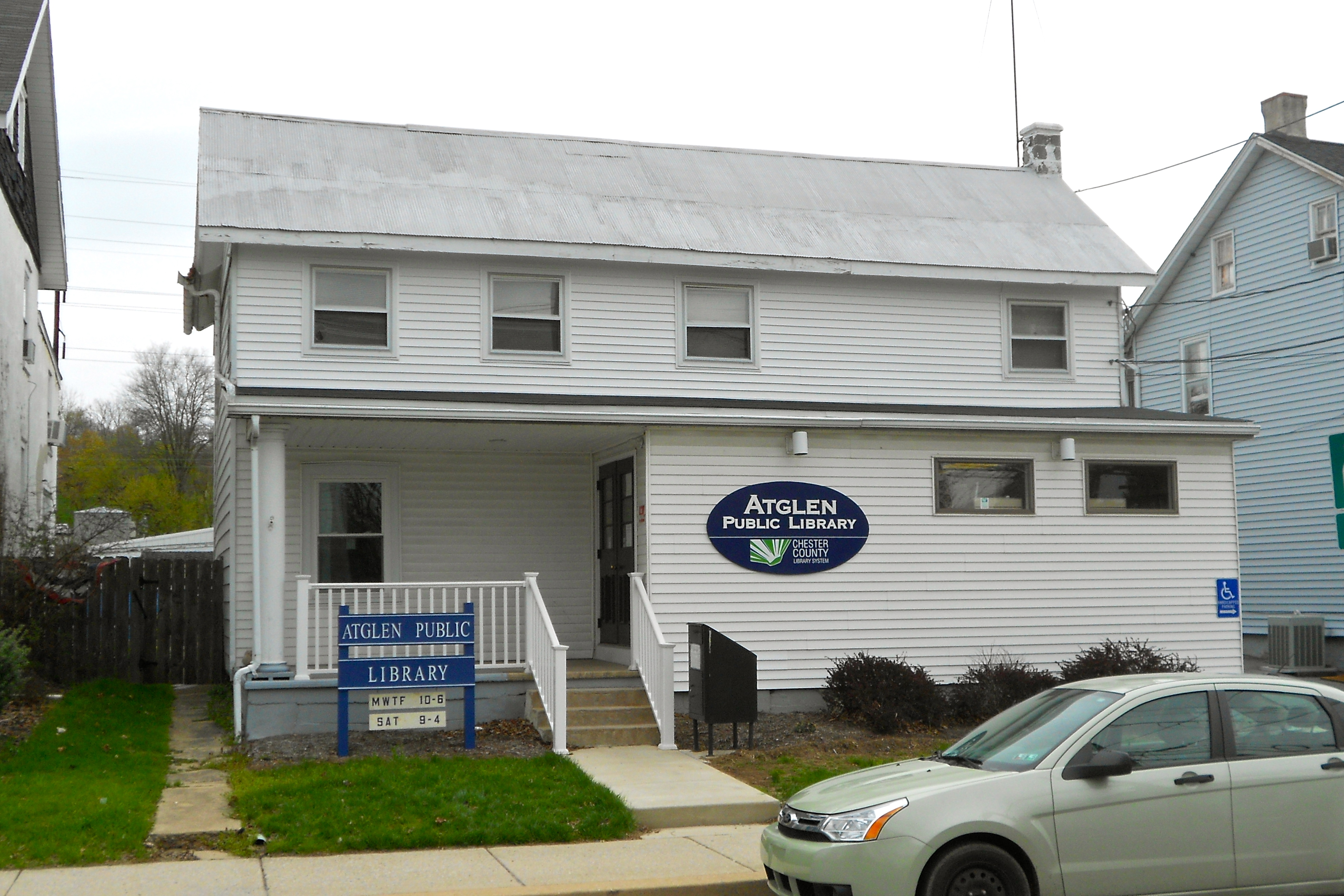
Atglen Public Library

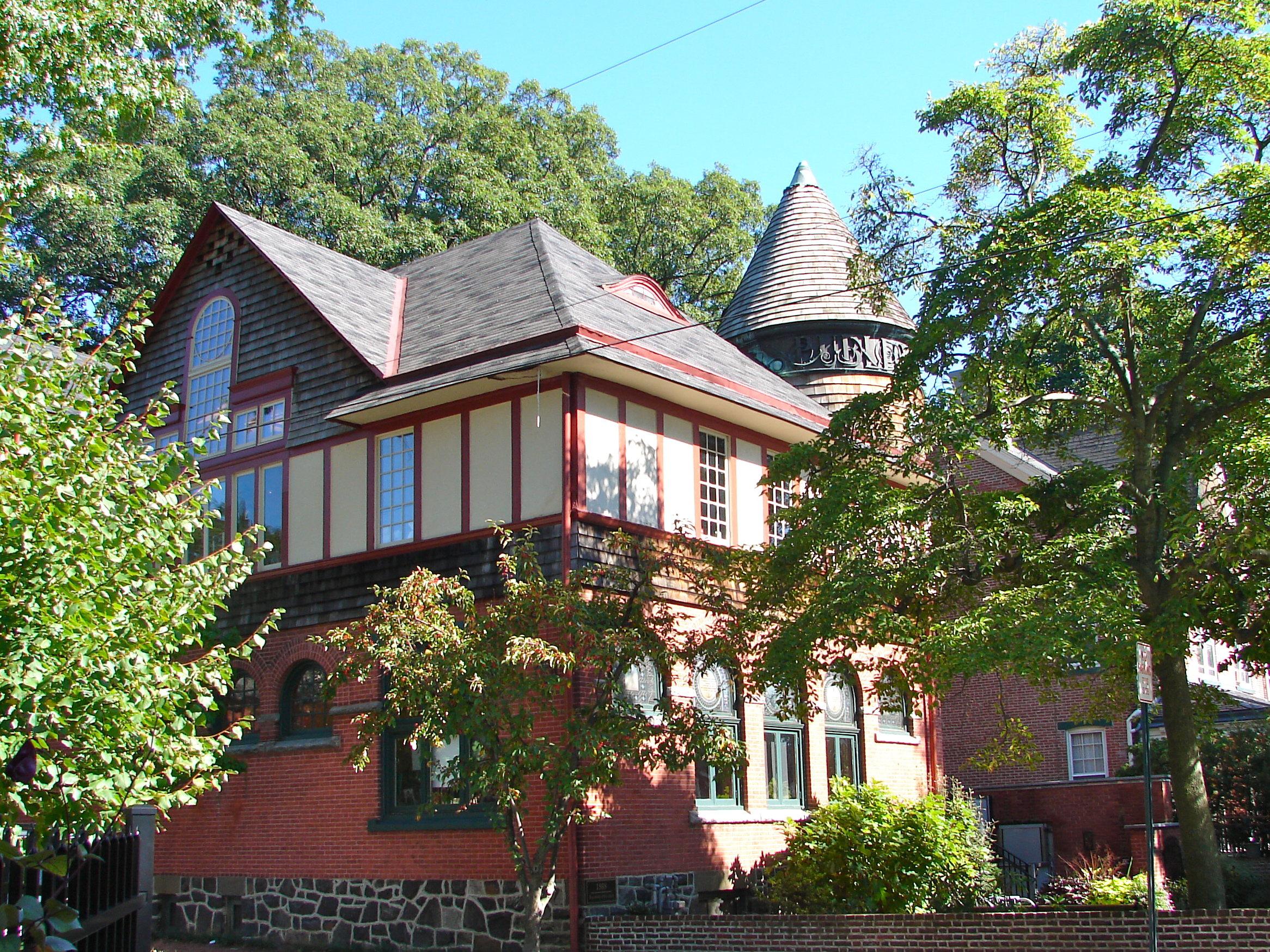
West Chester Public Library

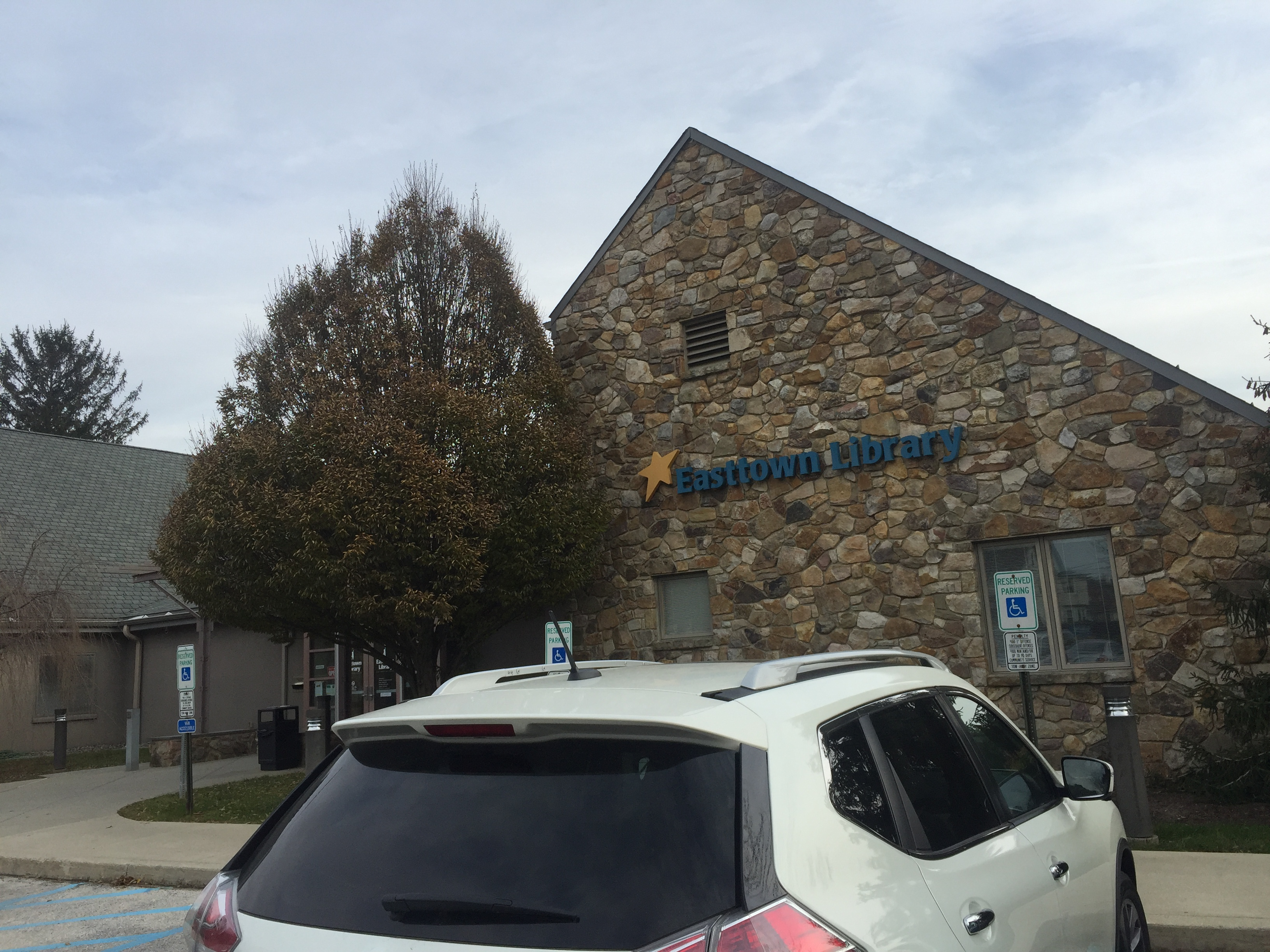
Easttown Library

- Atglen Public Library
- Avon Grove Library (West Grove)
- Chester Springs Library
- Chester County Library and District Center (Exton)
  - Henrietta Hankin Branch Library (West Vincent Township)
- Coatesville Area Public Library
- Downingtown Library
- Easttown Library
- Honey Brook Community Library
- Kennett Library
- Malvern Public Library
- Oxford Public Library
- Paoli Library
- Parkesburg Free Library
- Phoenixville Public Library
- Spring City Free Library
- Tredyffrin Public Library
- West Chester Public Library
