= Wexton =

Wexton is a surname. Notable people with the surname include:

- Jennifer Wexton (born 1968), American lawyer and politician
- Scott Wexton, American musician

== See also ==
- Weston (surname)
