= Rodney Exton =

English cricketer (1927–1999)

Personal information
- Full name: Rodney Noel Exton
- Born: 28 December 1927; Bournemouth, Hampshire, England
- Died: 22 December 1999 (aged 71); Westminster, London, England
- Batting: Right-handed
- Bowling: Right-arm off break

Domestic team information
- Years: Team
- 1946: Hampshire

Career statistics
Competition	First-class
Matches	4
Runs scored	39
Batting average	9.75
100s/50s	–/–
Top score	24*
Balls bowled	108
Wickets	0
Bowling average	–
5 wickets in innings	–
10 wickets in match	–
Best bowling	–
Catches/stumpings	1/–
- Source: Cricinfo, 1 January 2010

Rodney Noel Exton (28 December 1927 – 22 December 1999) was an English first-class cricketer and educator.

Exton was born at Bournemouth in December 1927. He was educated at Clifton College, where he captained the college cricket team and was considered a talented cricketer who. Exton made his debut in first-class cricket for Hampshire against Leicestershire at Bournemouth in the 1946 County Championship. He would make three further first-class appearances in 1946, before contracting polio later in that season, which ended his cricket career. In his four matches, he scored 39 runs with a highest score of 24 not out, in addition to bowling a total of 18 wicketless overs. Following the premature end of his cricket career, Exton proceeded to study at Lincoln College, Oxford between 1948 and 1951. After graduating from Oxford, he became a schoolteacher. He taught at Eton College and Mill Hill, before becoming headmaster at Reed's School. Exton died at Westminster in December 1999.
