= Reston Parkway =

Reston Parkway may refer to two things related to the town of Reston, Virginia, US:

- Virginia State Route 602 (Fairfax County), a highway
- Reston Town Center station, originally Reston Parkway, a Washington Metro station
