= Paoli, Pennsylvania =

Unincorporated community in Pennsylvania, US

Paoli
- Census-designated place
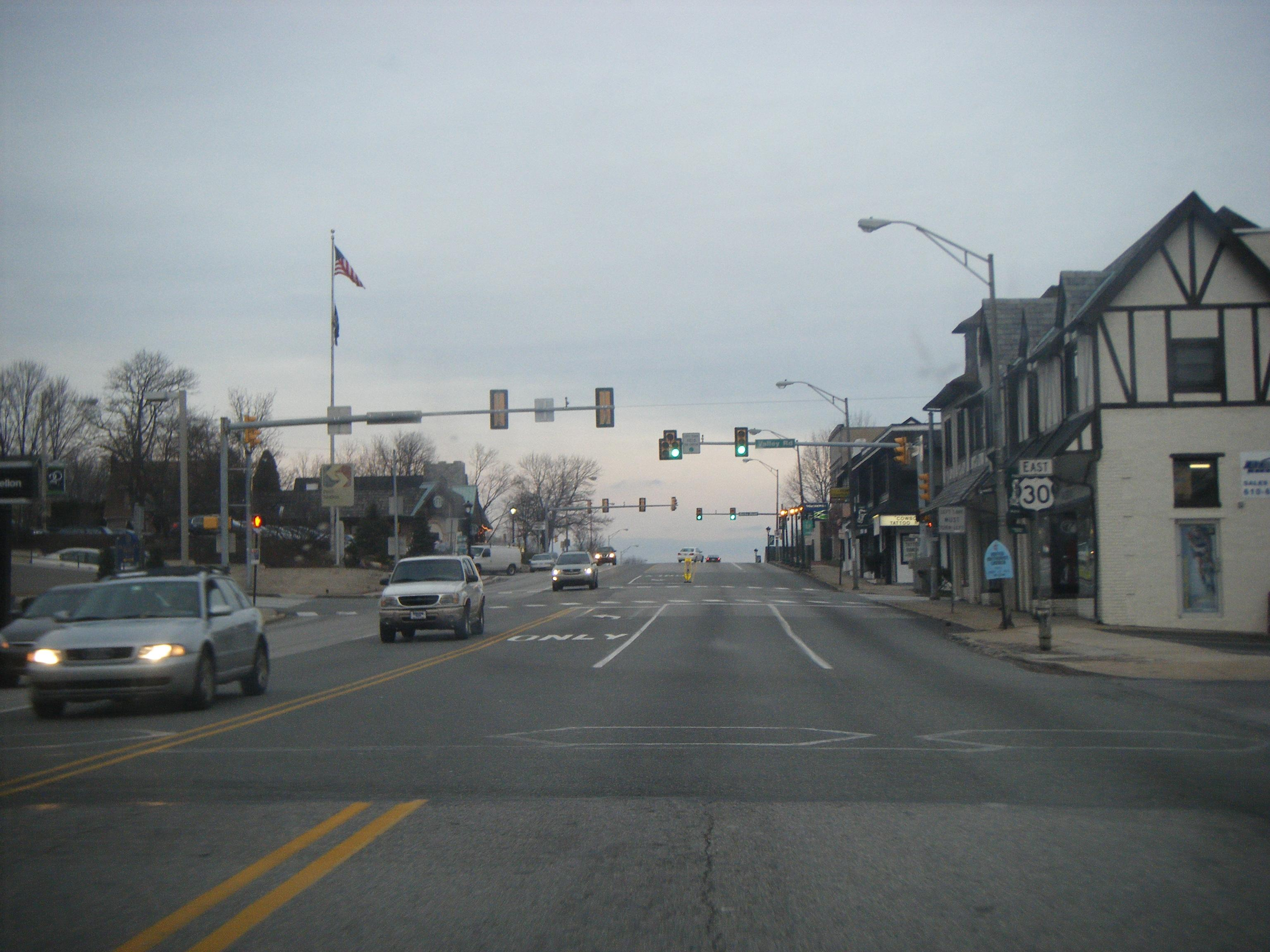
- Lancaster Avenue in Paoli

- Location of Paoli in Chester County (top) and of Chester County in Pennsylvania (below)

- Location of Paoli in the United States
- Coordinates: 40°02′27″N 75°29′24″W
- Country: United States
- State: Pennsylvania
- County: Chester
- Township: Tredyffrin
- Established: 1719

Area
  - Total: 2.02 sq mi (5.23 km^{2})
  - Land: 2.02 sq mi (5.22 km^{2})
  - Water: 0.0039 sq mi (0.01 km^{2})
- Elevation: 509 ft (155 m)

Population (2020)
  - Total: 6,002
  - Density: 2,979.1/sq mi (1,150.24/km^{2})
- Time zone: UTC-5 (EST)
  - Summer (DST): UTC-4 (EDT)
- ZIP Code: 19301
- Area codes: 610 and 484
- FIPS code: 42-57816

Paoli (/peɪˈoʊli/ pay-OH-lee) is a census-designated place (CDP) in Chester County near Philadelphia, Pennsylvania, United States. It is situated in portions of two townships: Tredyffrin and Willistown. At the 2020 census, it had a total population of 6,002.

== History ==
Paoli grew around an inn kept in 1769 by Joshua Evans, whose father bought 500 acres (200 ha) from William Penn in 1719 near the current site of the Paoli Post Office. Evans named his inn after General Pasquale Paoli, a Corsican, after Paoli had received the 45th and final toast at a Saint Patrick's Day celebration. The inn's location on the Philadelphia and Lancaster Turnpike, about 20 miles (one day's drive for a horse-drawn wagon) from Philadelphia, contributed to its success.

=== Battle of Paoli ===
On the evening of September 20, 1777, near Paoli, General Charles Grey and nearly 5,000 British soldiers launched a surprise attack on a Patriot encampment, which became known as the Battle of Paoli. Having intercepted General Washington's orders to General Wayne regarding British rearguard actions, Grey directed his troops to assault the small regiment of Americans commanded by Anthony Wayne in an area near his residence. Not wanting to lose the element of surprise, Grey ordered his troops to remove the flint from their muskets and to use only bayonets or swords to launch a surprise sneak attack on the Americans under the cover of darkness.

With the help of a Loyalist spy who provided a secret password, "here we are and there they go" and led them to the camp, General "No-flint" Grey and the British overran several American pickets and launched their successful attack on the Continental Army camp. Two hundred one American soldiers were killed or injured, while 71 were captured. The British suffered only four killed and seven injured in comparison. Wayne's reputation was tarnished by the high casualties suffered in the battle, and he demanded a formal court-martial to clear his name. On November 1, a board of 13 officers declared that Wayne had acted with honor. The site of the battle is now part of nearby Malvern, Pennsylvania.

=== Philadelphia Main Line ===
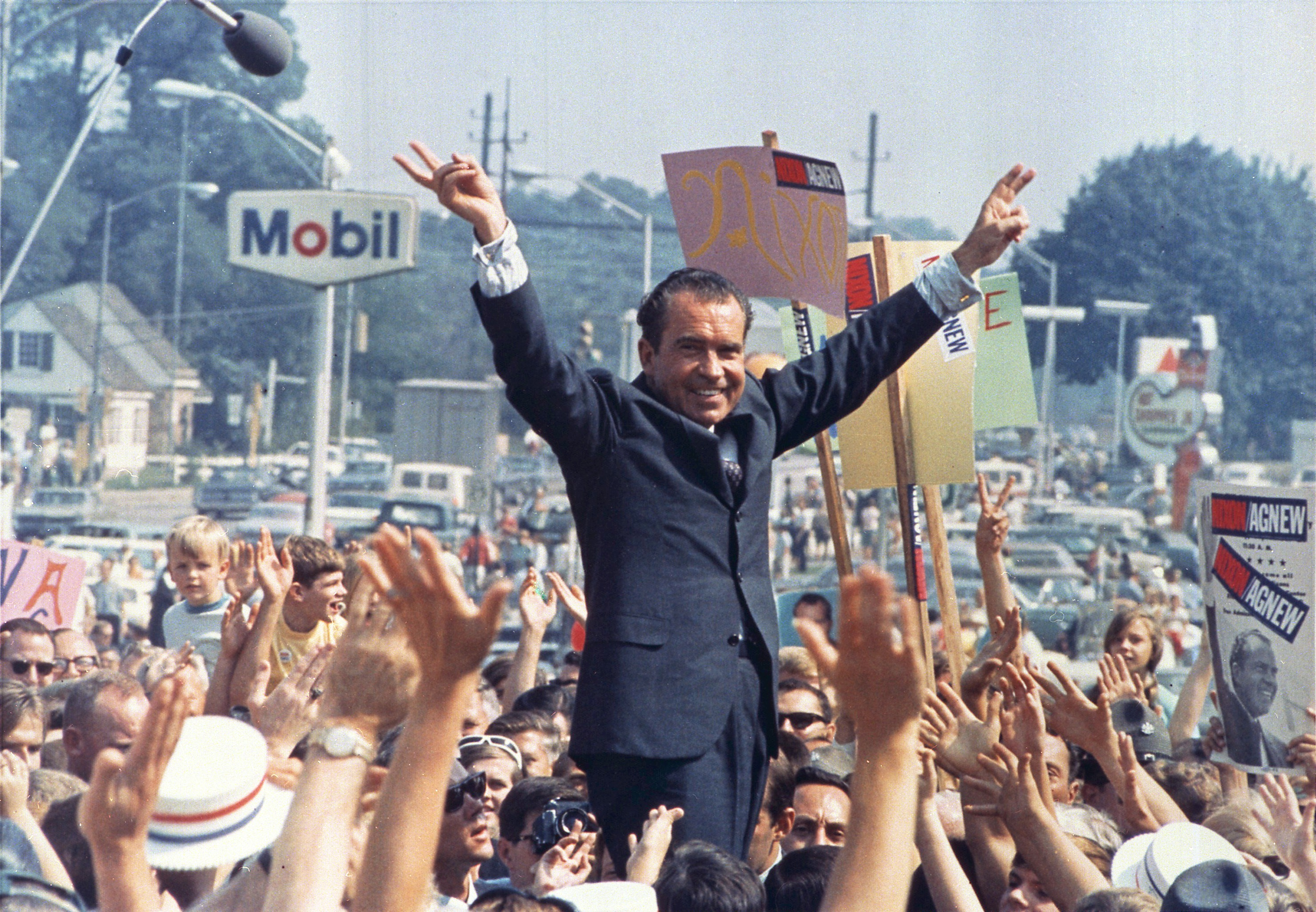
Richard Nixon makes a campaign stop in Paoli during the 1968 presidential campaign in July 1968

The construction of the Main Line of Public Works across Pennsylvania enhanced the village's stature, as the Philadelphia and Columbia Railroad passed through it. This became the Pennsylvania Railroad, which built suburban commuter lines out from Philadelphia in the late 19th century, spurring the growth of that city's suburbs. The largest and longest of these commuter lines, the "Main Line", terminated in Paoli.

=== Philadelphia Folk Festival ===
"The Homestead," the fifteen-acre farm of Colley Wilson, on the south side of Swedesford Road, was the scene of the first annual Philadelphia Folk Festival in 1962, and remained at that site until 1965. It outgrew the space when an estimated 15,000 people attended the final year. The site has been subdivided. Gene Shay, a member of the Festival committee, observed after the first Festival, the site "with its spacious grassy valleys, clean running brooks, shaded hillsides and rustic barns, supplied the perfect background for all of the musical activity." In those few years Acts such as Pete Seeger, Judy Collins, Mississippi John Hurt, Phil Ochs, Bill Monroe, Tom Rush, Tom Paxton, Rev. Gary Davis, Rambling Jack Elliott, Buffy Sainte-Marie, and The Paul Butterfield Blues Band, and other performers.

== Geography ==
According to the United States Census Bureau, the CDP has a total area of 2.0 square miles (5.2 km^{2}), all land. Paoli borders other towns, such as Berwyn and Malvern. These three towns belong to either the Tredyffrin/Easttown or the Great Valley school districts.

== Demographics ==
Historical population
Census	Pop.	Note	%±
2010	5,575		—
2020	6,002		7.7%

As of the 2019 survey, there were 5,651 people, 2,552 housing units and 1,437 families residing in the CDP. The population density was 2,710.2 inhabitants per square mile (1,046.4/km^{2}). There were 2,468 housing units at an average density of 1,233.0 per square mile (476.1/km^{2}). The racial makeup of the CDP was 90.93% White, 5.36% Black, 0.09% Native American, 2.64% Asian, 0.02% Pacific Islander, 0.39% from other races, and 0.57% from two or more races. 0.85% of the population were Hispanic or Latino of any race.

There were 2,361 households, of which 24.5% had children under the age of 18 living with them, 51.0% were married couples living together, 7.7% had a female householder with no husband present, and 39.1% were non-families. 32.9% of all households were made up of individuals, and 15.2% had someone living alone who was 65 years of age or older. The average household size was 2.24 and the average family size was 2.89.

20.2% of the population were under the age of 18, 4.7% from 18 to 24, 31.5% from 25 to 44, 25.0% from 45 to 64, and 18.7% who were 65 years of age or older. The median age was 41 years. For every 100 females, there were 89.8 males. For every 100 females age 18 and over, there were 83.2 males.

According to the 2024 American Communities Survey, the median household income was $117,094 and the median family income was $170,433. The per capita income was $70,424. 4.6% of the population were below the poverty line.

== Notable people ==
Notable people who were born or lived in Paoli include:

- Joe Butler (1866–1941), boxer
- Chubby Checker (born 1941), American rock and roll singer and dancer
- Dan Chisena (born 1997), professional football player, Carolina Panthers
- Mary Pat Christie, former First Lady of New Jersey (2010–2018) and investment banker
- Wharton Esherick (1887–1970), sculptor
- Susan Henking, president of Shimer College
- Kristin Luckenbill (born 1979), professional soccer goalkeeper
- Max Patkin (1920–1999), baseball player and clown
- Ron Silliman (born 1946), American poet
- Anthony Wayne (1745–1796), U.S. Army officer during the American Revolutionary War
- Isaac Wayne (1772–1852), U.S. Congressman

== Education ==
=== Primary and secondary schools ===
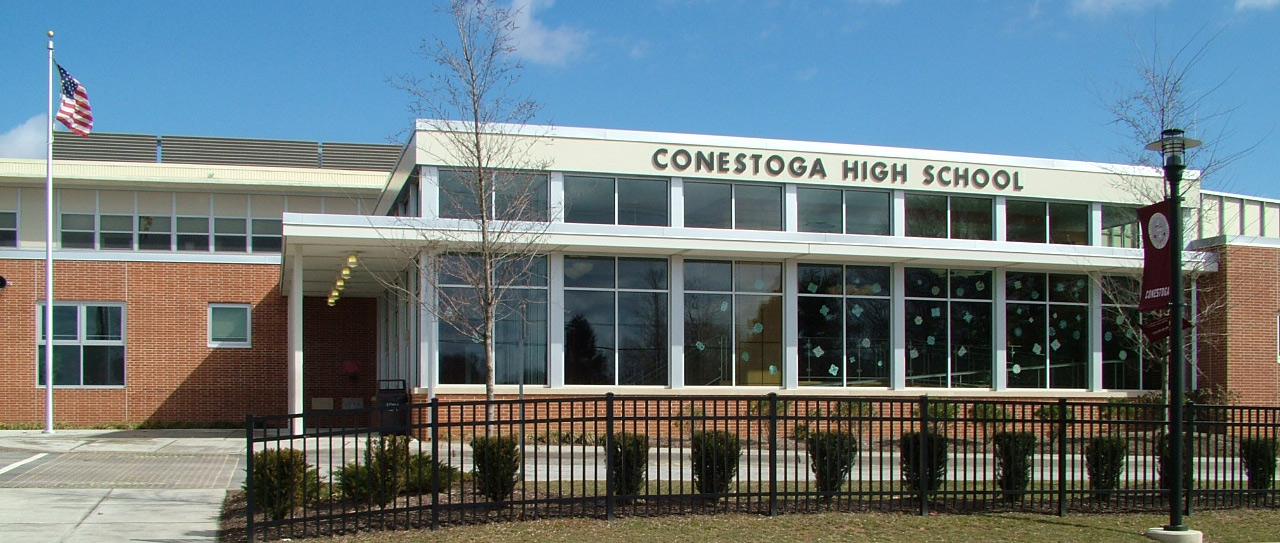
Conestoga High School serves portions of Paoli

The Tredyffrin/Easttown School District serves the portions of Paoli in Tredyffrin Township. The section of Paoli in Willistown Township is served by Great Valley School District.

The portion of Paoli in T/E are divided between the zoned of Beaumont Elementary School in Easttown Township and Hillside Elementary School in Tredyffrin Township. The Great Valley elementary schools, Charlestown, K.D. Markley, Sugartown and General Wayne, all filter into Great Valley Middle School. Tredyffrin/Easttown operates two middle schools, Tredyffrin/Easttown and Valley Forge, and all district students attend Conestoga High School. Great Valley students attend Great Valley High School.

Delaware Valley Friends School is a school for those with learning differences in Paoli located next to Station Square, a business complex.

The Roman Catholic Archdiocese of Philadelphia operates Catholic schools. St. Norbert School is in Easttown Township, and is outside of the Paoli CDP, but has a Paoli mailing address. The school was established in 1956, with the school building built the following year.

=== Public libraries ===
Tredyffrin Township Libraries operates the Paoli Library in Paoli. The Paoli Library is part of the Chester County Library System.

== Transportation ==
=== Roads ===
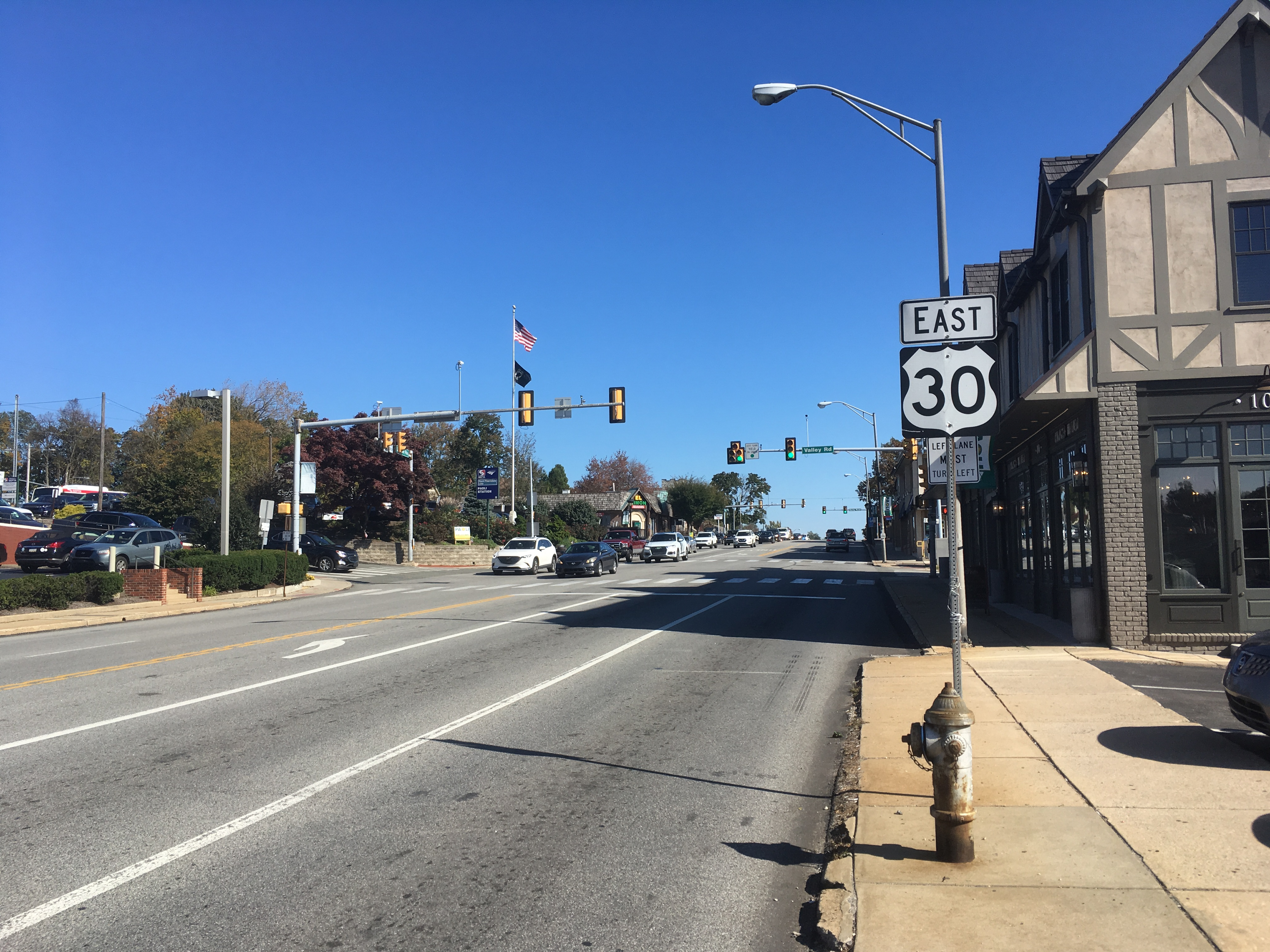
US Route 30 passing through Paoli along Lancaster Avenue

Paoli is served by the U.S. Route 202 freeway, U.S. Route 30 and Pennsylvania Route 252 connecting it to King of Prussia and Philadelphia. Historically, Paoli was on the Philadelphia and Lancaster Turnpike, which was later absorbed into the Lincoln Highway, and became US 30 still later. Many locals still call the route "Lancaster Pike".

=== Public transit ===
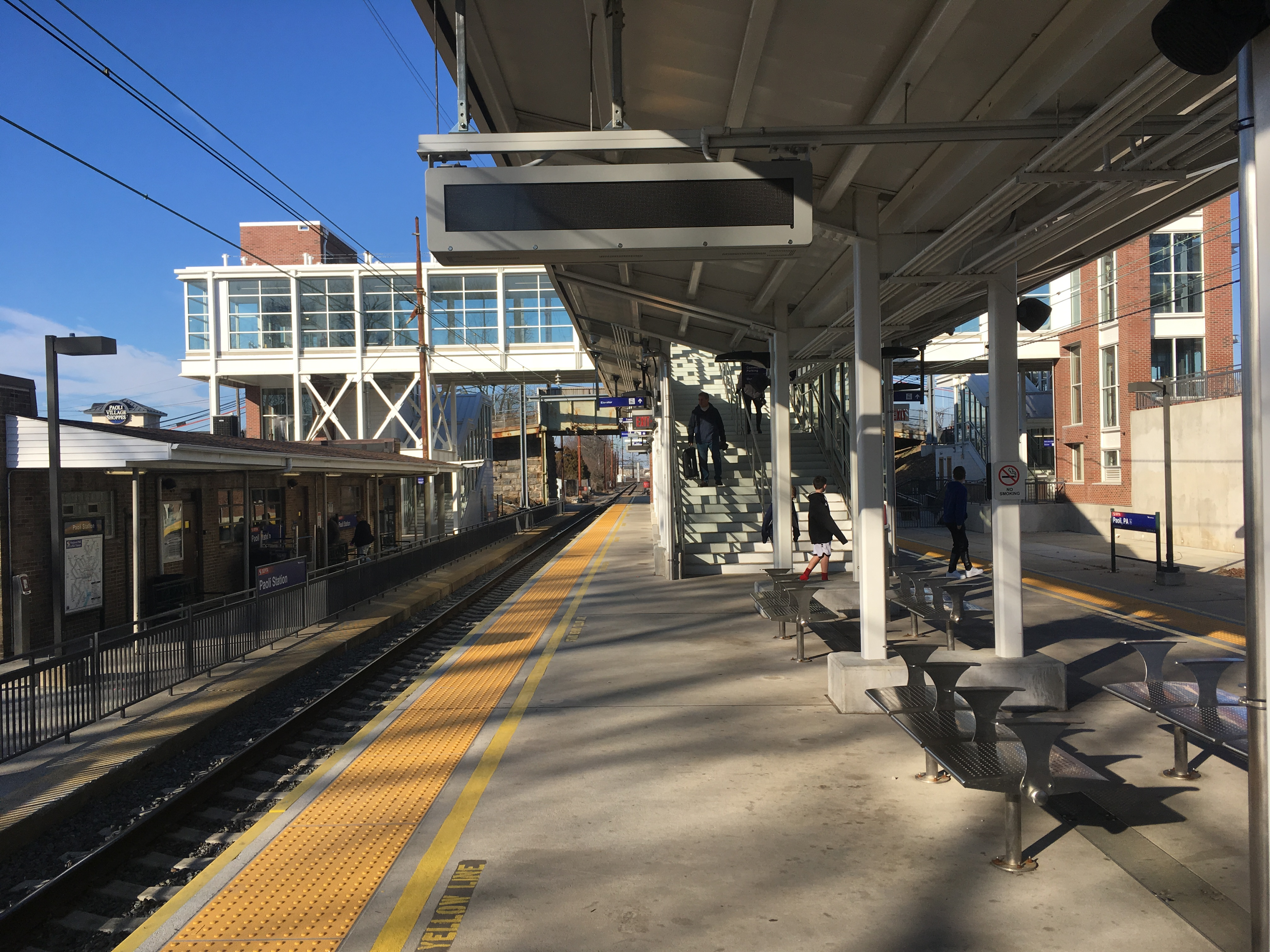
Paoli station in Paoli

For generations, Paoli was the western terminus of Pennsylvania Railroad commuter trains coming from Philadelphia on the Main Line. The "Paoli Local" became iconic in the western suburbs. Amtrak's Keystone Service and Pennsylvanian trains stop at Paoli station, but with the decline of long-distance train travel, the stops are now less frequent.

Commuters traveling by rail within Southeastern Pennsylvania use the Paoli station, although most local trains serving Paoli now terminate in Malvern, one stop to the west. SEPTA Regional Rail's Paoli/Thorndale Line (formerly R5) commuter rail runs between Thorndale and Philadelphia both ways every 30 minutes during the week. College students and city-working suburbanites take the Paoli/Thorndale Line to school and work. Station-to-station, a trip from Paoli to Center City Philadelphia on the Paoli/Thorndale Line takes approximately 45 minutes, although some rush hour trains run directly between Paoli and 30th Street Station in under 30 minutes.

Paoli is served by multiple SEPTA Suburban Bus routes. Local buses traverse Route 30 along the Main Line, and Paoli Pike is the main artery for buses heading to West Chester. The Route 92 bus connects Paoli to West Chester and the King of Prussia Transit Center at the King of Prussia Mall. The Route 105 bus links Paoli to the other Main Line communities and the 69th Street Transportation Center. The Route 204 and Route 206 buses connect the Paoli station to Eagleview and the Great Valley Corporate Center respectively.

In 2016, the majority of Paoli residents were found to drive alone on their way to work, while only 10.97% took public transportation.

== Corporate headquarters ==
- AMETEK, producer of electronic instruments
- DuckDuckGo, Internet search engine
- Geneva Global, philanthropy consulting firm
- Turn5, online retailer of automotive parts

== Gallery ==
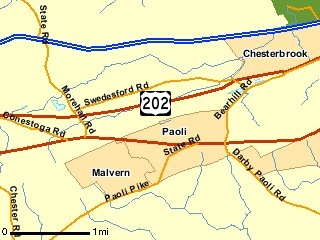
Location of Paoli in relation to Malvern and Chesterbrook

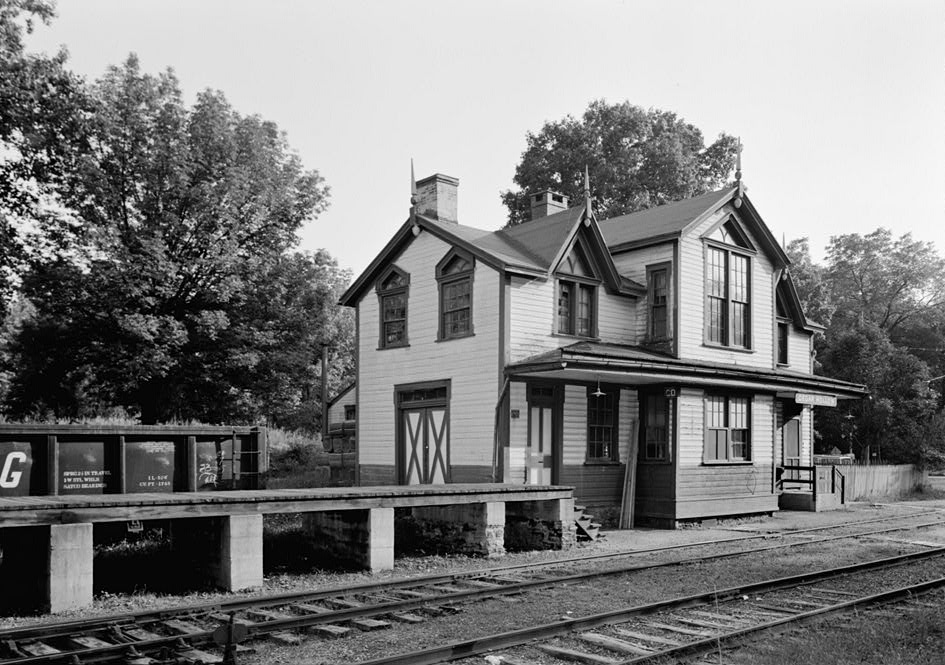
Cedar Hollow Railroad Station in Paoli.
