= Hugh Exton =

South African photographer (1864–1955)

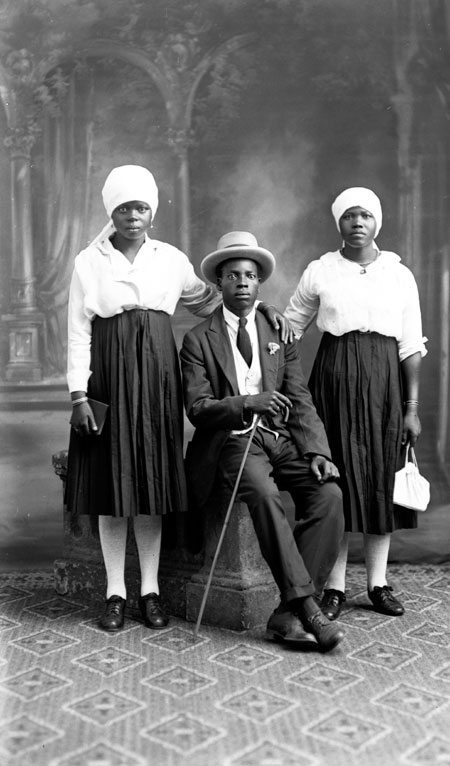

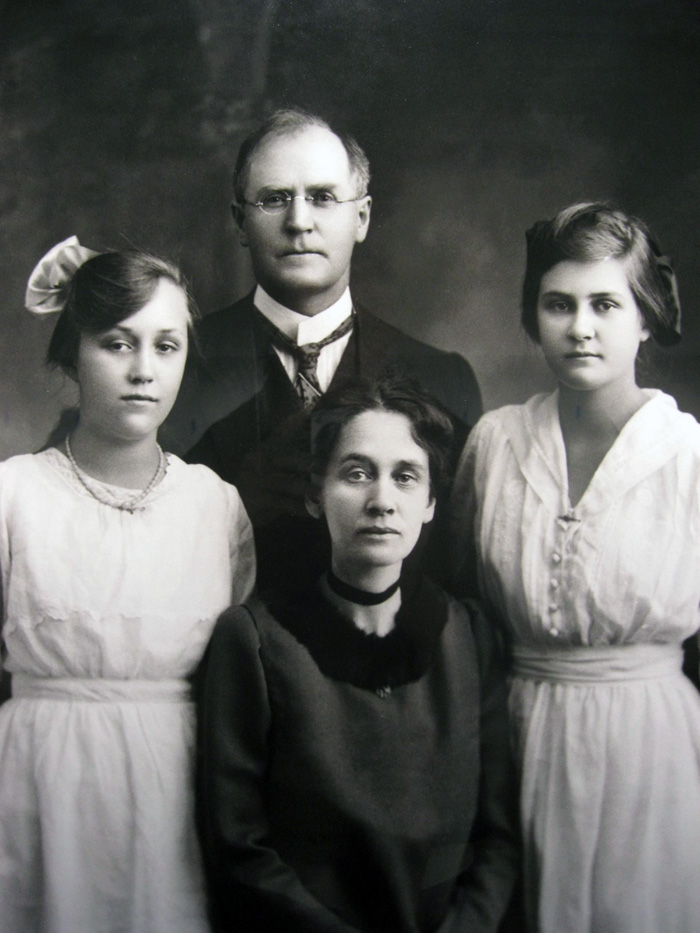

Hugh Exton (26 March 1864 Cape Colony – 1955) was a South African self-taught photographer noted for creating more than 23000 glass slides during his career spanning 1892 to 1945, and preserved at the Hugh Exton Photographic Museum, a former Dutch Reformed church built in Pietersburg in the 1890s. He was the son of physician, anthropologist, geologist and collector, Hugh Exton (1833-1903) F.G.S., who was President of the South African Geological Society from its founding in 1895, and Jacomina Hendrina van der Poel.

Exton moved north from Cape Town in 1886, visiting the Marabastad Goldfields near Pietersburg, eventually settling in the town in 1899. He photographed a wide variety of historic events, including the Anglo-Boer War, documenting ordinary people and celebrities in the dress of the period, the architecture of the time, as well as images of the local industry and trade. He kept meticulous notes in appointment books, recording the details of every photograph he took. Exton's formal portraits of young dandies in three-piece suits, loving couples and demure farmers’ wives were produced in his studio around the turn of the 20th century. His collection of images traces the first 50 years of Pietersburg.

A photo album with images taken by Exton and inscribed ‘Souvenir of Northern Transvaal’ was presented to Chaim Weizmann by the Pietersburg Zionist Society in March 1932.

== Bibliography ==
- Potgieter, Henriet - 'Memories of Pietersburg' - Illustrated With Photographs Taken By Hugh Exton, Circa 1890 To 1945 - Commissioned by the Town Council Of Pietersburg for the Hugh Exton Photographic Museum, 1990.

== Gallery ==
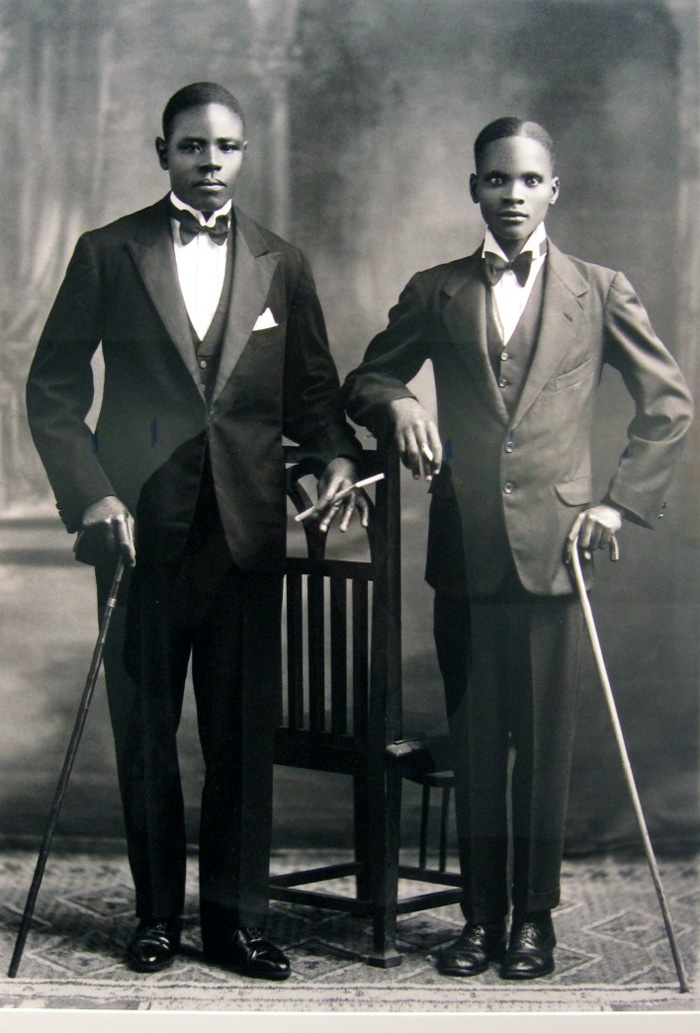

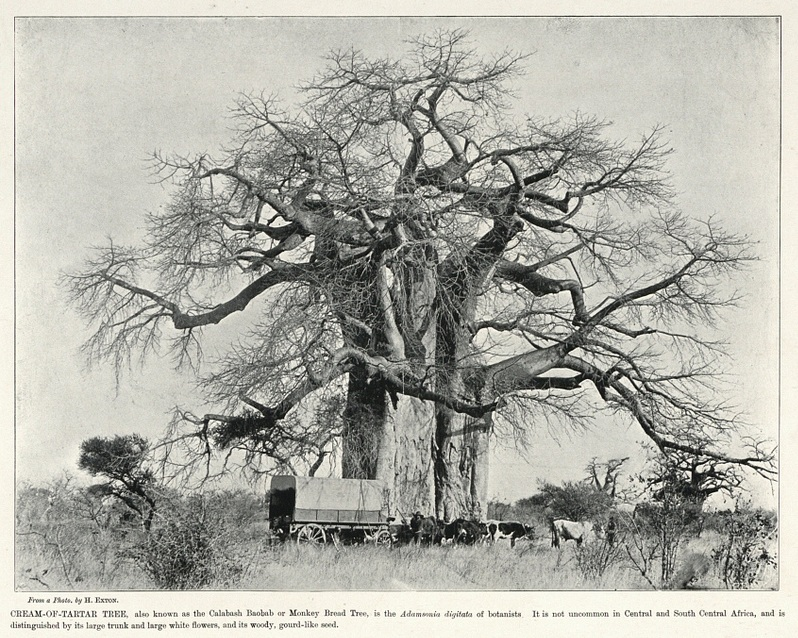
