= Reston (surname) =

Reston is an English surname. Notable people with the surname include:

- Agnes Reston (1771–1856), Scottish wartime nurse during the Peninsular War
- Ana Carolina Reston (1985–2006), Brazilian fashion model
- Arloa Reston (born 1978), American actress
- James Reston (1909–1995), American journalist
- James Reston Jr. (1941–2023), American author and journalist
- Thelma Reston (1937–2012), Brazilian actress

Fictional characters:

- Clive Reston, a character in the Marvel Comics Universe
