= Eagleview, Pennsylvania =

Unincorporated community in Pennsylvania, US

- Census-designated place
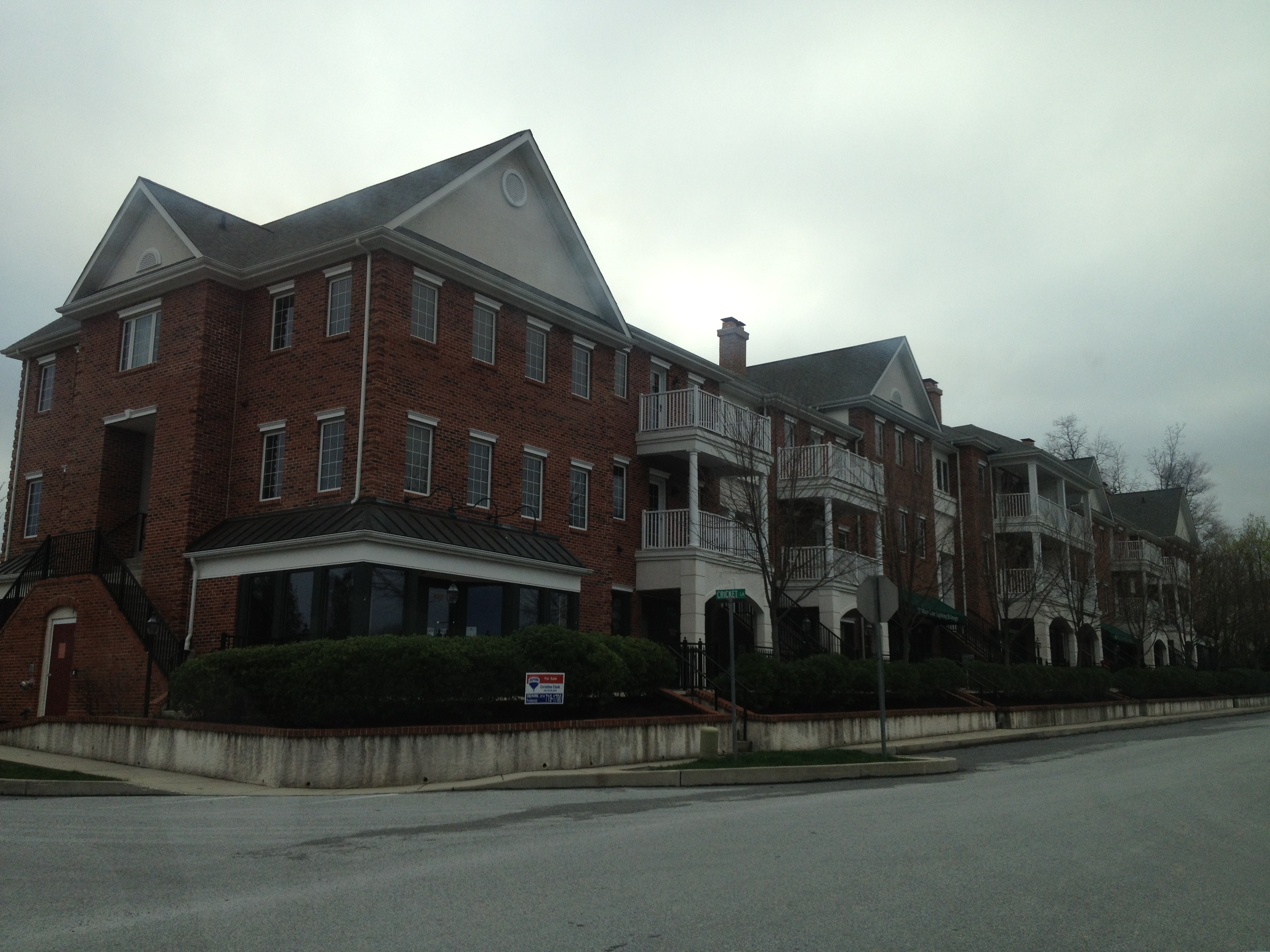
- Wharton Boulevard and Cricket Lane in Eagleview

- Location in Chester County and the state of Pennsylvania
- Coordinates: 40°3′41″N 75°40′31″W
- Country: United States
- State: Pennsylvania
- County: Chester
- Township: Uwchlan

Area
  - Total: 1.36 sq mi (3.51 km^{2})
  - Land: 1.34 sq mi (3.47 km^{2})
  - Water: 0.015 sq mi (0.04 km^{2})
- Elevation: 450 ft (140 m)

Population (2020)
  - Total: 2,193
  - Density: 1,634.9/sq mi (631.23/km^{2})
- Time zone: UTC-5 (Eastern (EST))
  - Summer (DST): UTC-4 (EDT)
- ZIP Code: 19403
- Area code: 610
- FIPS code: 42-20662

Eagleview is a census-designated place (CDP) in Uwchlan Township, Pennsylvania, United States. The population was 1,644 at the 2010 census.

Eagleview was created as "... an old fashion town where you can work, live, shop, see your elders, and care for the young all in the same place." According to a Landsat imagery, the Eagleview shopping center represents a medium density development that generated 400 square feet more living space per acre per the source than lower density developments also shown in the same imagery. Stevens, in his book on a study of how to make communities safer in new urban developments uses Eagleview, along with Weatherstone, as sample data for comparing amount of green space for every acreage of development. The community was listed in volume 6 of the New Urban News as an example of this new type of housing development.

The shopping district inside the census designated place of the same name contains a mixed use community of stores, restaurants, and residential units with "walkable streets" and green spaces according to the official website.

== Geography ==
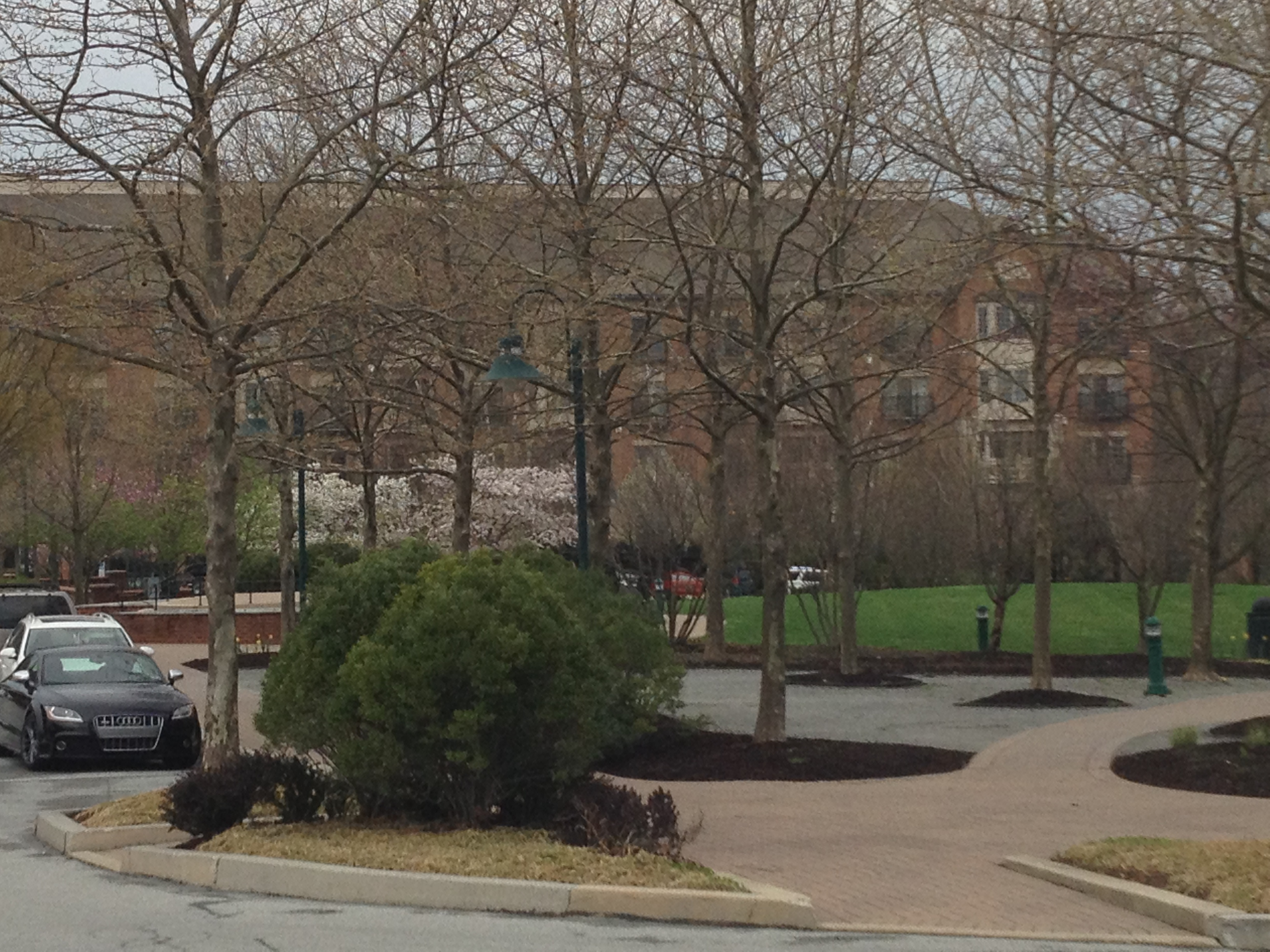
Eagleview Town Center

Eagleview is located at 40°3′41″N 75°40′31″W along the northwest border of Uwchlan Township. Pennsylvania Route 100, also known as Pottstown Pike, forms the northeastern edge of Eagleview, including Route 100's connection to Exit 312 of the Pennsylvania Turnpike. According to the U.S. Census Bureau, Eagleview has a total area of 1.4 square miles (3.5 km^{2}), all land.

Historical population
Census	Pop.	Note	%±
2020	2,193		—
U.S. Decennial Census

== See also ==
- Weatherstone, Pennsylvania
