= Ovoferrin =

Ovoferrin was a dietary supplement originally produced in the United States by A.C. Barnes Company of Philadelphia, Pennsylvania and later by Zonite Products Corporation, which acquired A.C. Barnes Company in 1929. The product grossed approximately $400,000 annually in 1929. Both Ovoferrin and Argyrol continued to be exclusively manufactured by A.C. Barnes Company, which became a subsidiary of Zonite Products Corporation. On January 2, 1946 Ovoferrin and Argyrol were assigned to Erwin, Wasey & Company, a New York based advertising agency.

== Chemical composition ==
Ovoferrin was advertised as a supplement for iron and Vitamin B.

Ovoferrin's manufacturer described its makeup as being neutral in reaction. A tablespoon was stated to be equivalent to a single grain of elementary iron. When potassium ferrocyanide is added to Ovorferrin no change is observed. However the addition of hydrochloric acid to Ovoferrin produces a well-known color and precipitate of Prussian blue. This indicates that hydrochloric acid changes Ovoferrin, producing an inorganic iron.
