= The Studio Boat (Le Bateau-atelier) =

1876 painting by Claude Monet

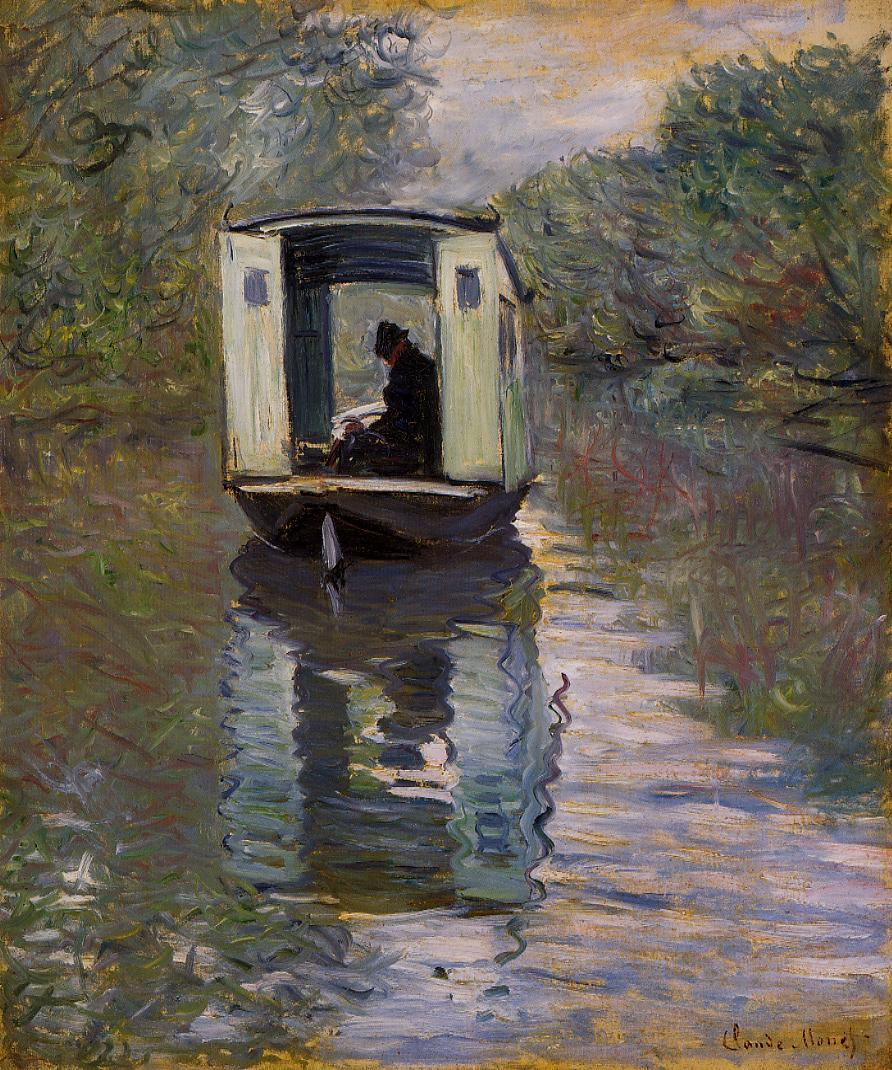
- Year: 1876
- Medium: oil paint, canvas
- Dimensions: 72.7 cm (28.6 in) × 60 cm (24 in)
- Location: Barnes Foundation
- Accession: BF730

The Studio Boat (Le Bateau-atelier) is a painting from 1876 by the French Impressionist Claude Monet. The work depicts Monet at work in his studio boat on the Seine in Argentueil. It was executed en plein air in oil on canvas. It currently is in the collection of the Barnes Foundation of Philadelphia.

Monet bought the boat around 1873 soon after moving to Argenteuil. He described the boat as "a cabin made out of planks were I had just enough room to set up my easel." Monet most likely modeled his studio boat on the studio boat used by his friend and contemporary Charles François Daubigny. The floating studio enabled Monet to paint views from the Seine that would otherwise be inaccessible, beginning with a series of paintings of the sailing boats at Petit-Gennevilliers.

Monet lived near the Seine throughout his life and painted his studio boat on several occasions, both at Argenteuil and at Giverny, where he later lived. He was also pictured by his friend Édouard Manet working on the boat in 1874 in the company of his wife Camille.

== Motivations ==
Monet had multiple economic motivations for painting this work. During the 1870s, Monet embraced the growing trend of working en plein air while also using smaller canvases in order to make his works more salable to the growing middle class. During the 1850s, sail boats became an affordable pastime for the bourgeoisie in Europe, of which Monet was part. His frequent painting of boating scenes on the Seine such as this one are believed to signal Monet's efforts to make paintings that would be attractive to the middle class. This work specifically is believed to be inspired by an etching by Charles François Daubigny called Gulping it Down (Luncheon on the Boat) created in 1861 and published in 1862.

However, Monet also had many artistic motivations that played into the creation of this work. It has been pointed out that this work marks a shift in Monet's en plain air style of art. His depiction of himself at work in his studio boat demonstrates that the scene was not painted completely from observation, marking the beginning of Monet's movement beyond the Impressionist style. Scholars have suggested Monet did this to highlight the "creative role of the artist" within the work. Additionally, Monet's depiction of this idyllic river scene points to the movement of his artistic inspiration away from depicting industrial and urban scenes. Instead, Monet chooses to focus on natural scenery in which he "retreats to the untrammeled past" and tends to focus on the themes of isolation and contemplation. However, at this time, Monet did not completely cease painting urban industrial scenes.

== Related works ==
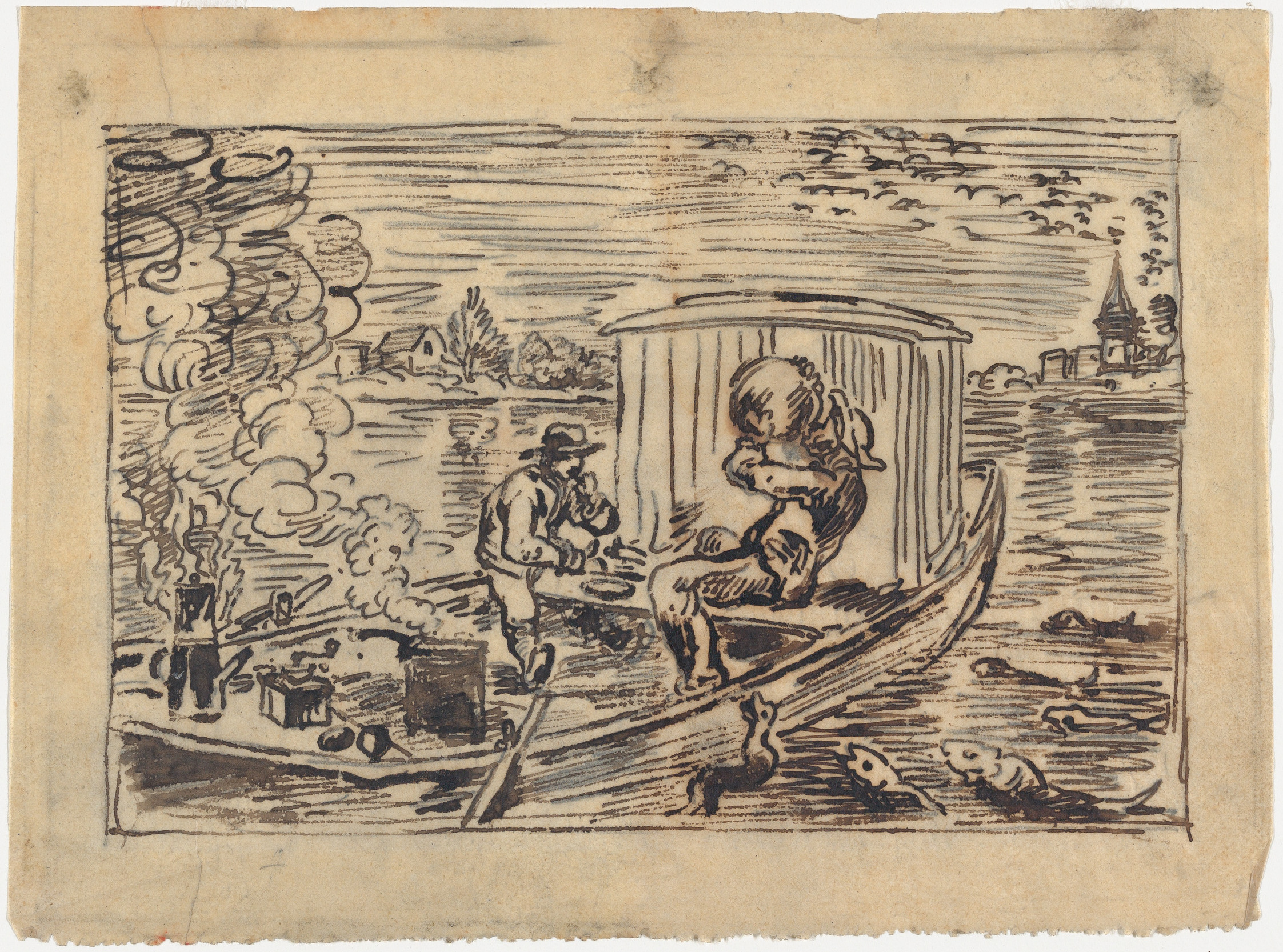
Guzzling or Lunch on the Boat by Charles-François Daubigny (1862)

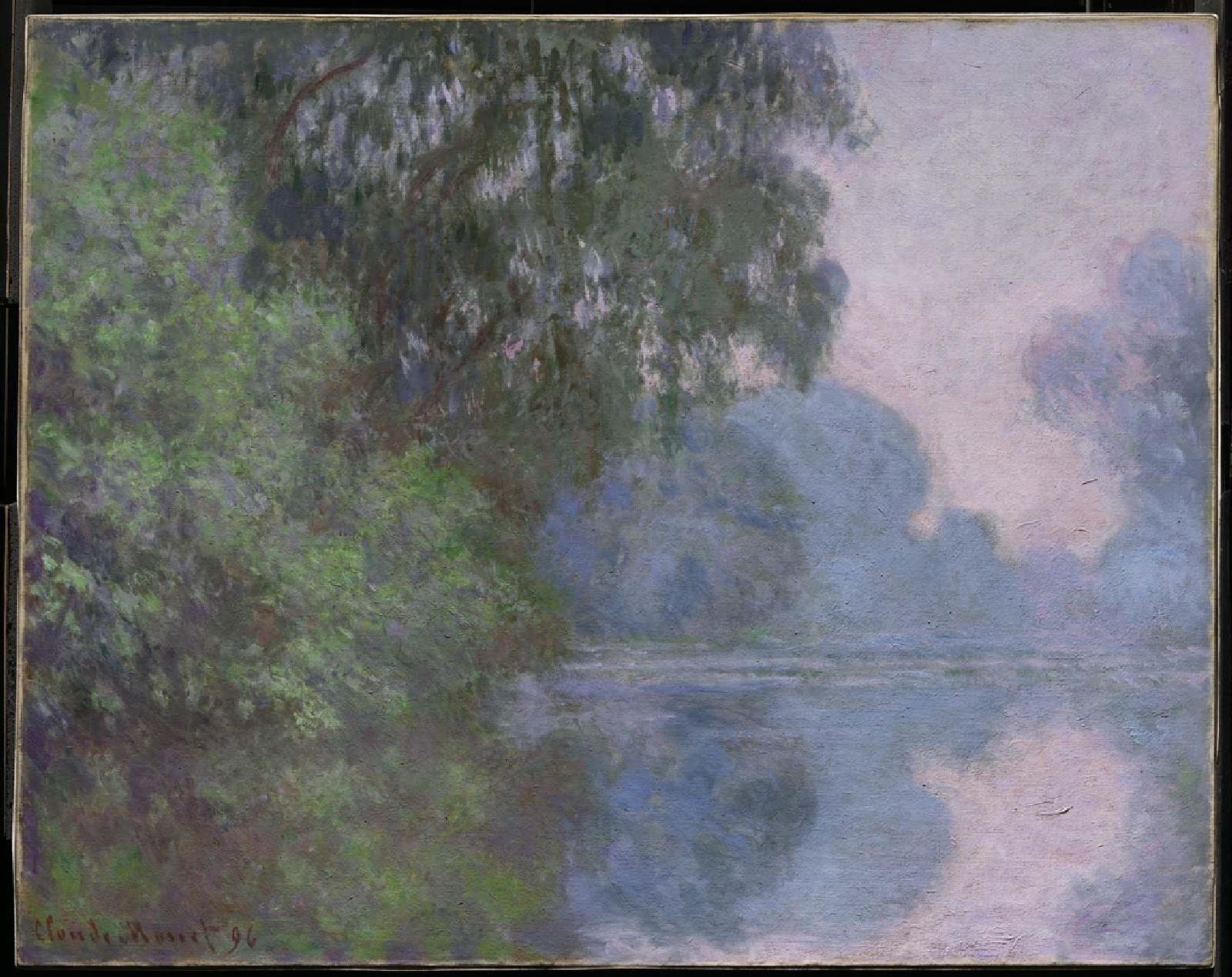
Morning on the Seine, near Giverny by Claude Monet (1896)

Art historians believe the painting was inspired by Gulping it Down (Luncheon on the Boat) by Charles François Daubigny based on their similar content and compositions. Monet's painting is also frequently contrasted with Edouard Manet's painting Monet Working on his Floating Studio in Argentuil from 1874. Manet's piece provides a closer view of the boat and gives more indication of surrounding human activity, integrating the natural and industrial elements of Argenteuil with ease. Additionally, due to Monet's move away from industrial scenes at this time in his career, his works at this time are compared to the prior Barbizon School of art which also focused on picturesque nature views. This work has also been compared to some of Monet's later works due to their similarities in composition and style. Specifically, The Studio Boat (Le Bateau-atelier) has been connected to the artist's successful Mornings on the Seine series from the 1890s due to both works demonstrating Monet's move beyond the Impressionist style.

== Gallery ==
Related Works
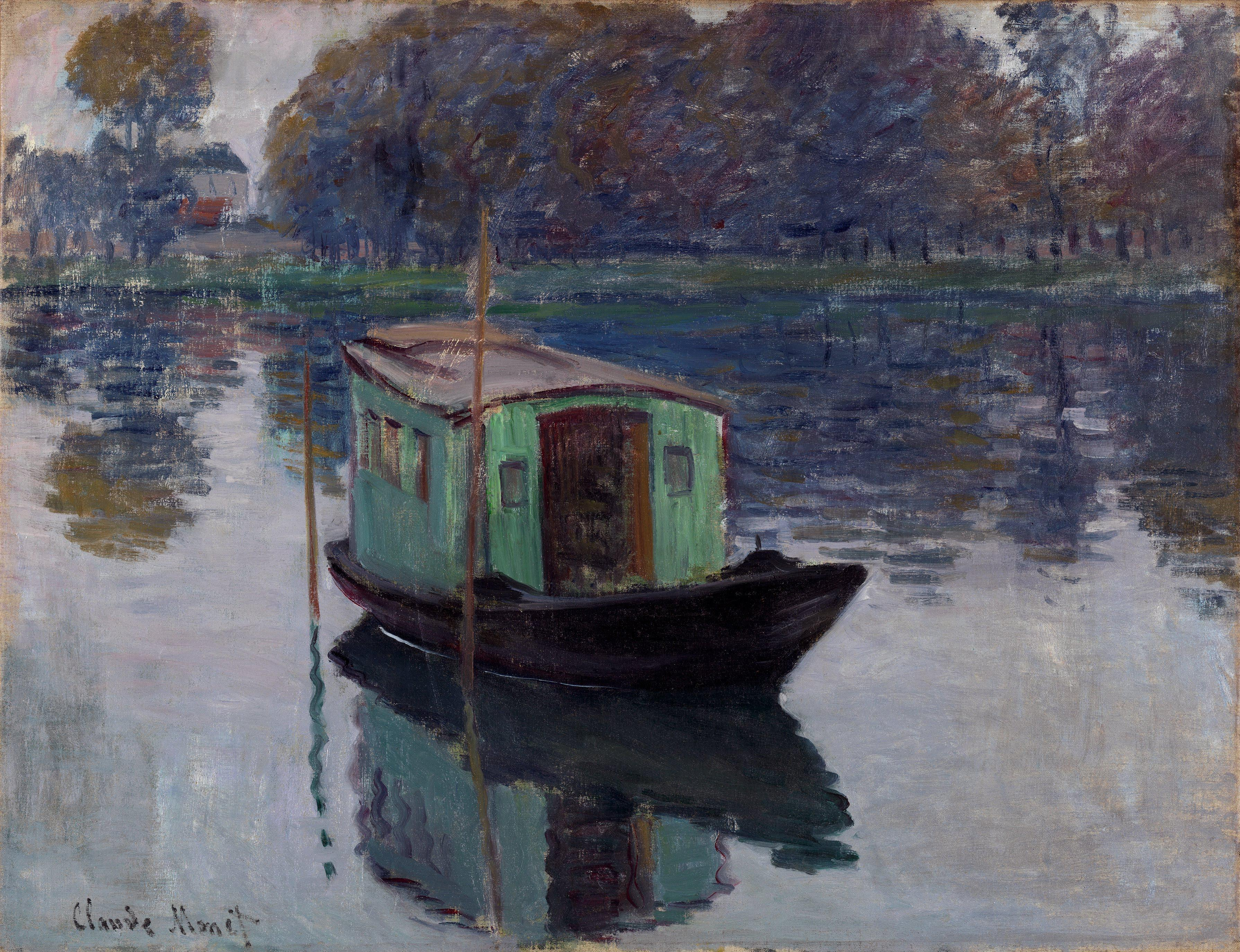
The Studio Boat, 1874

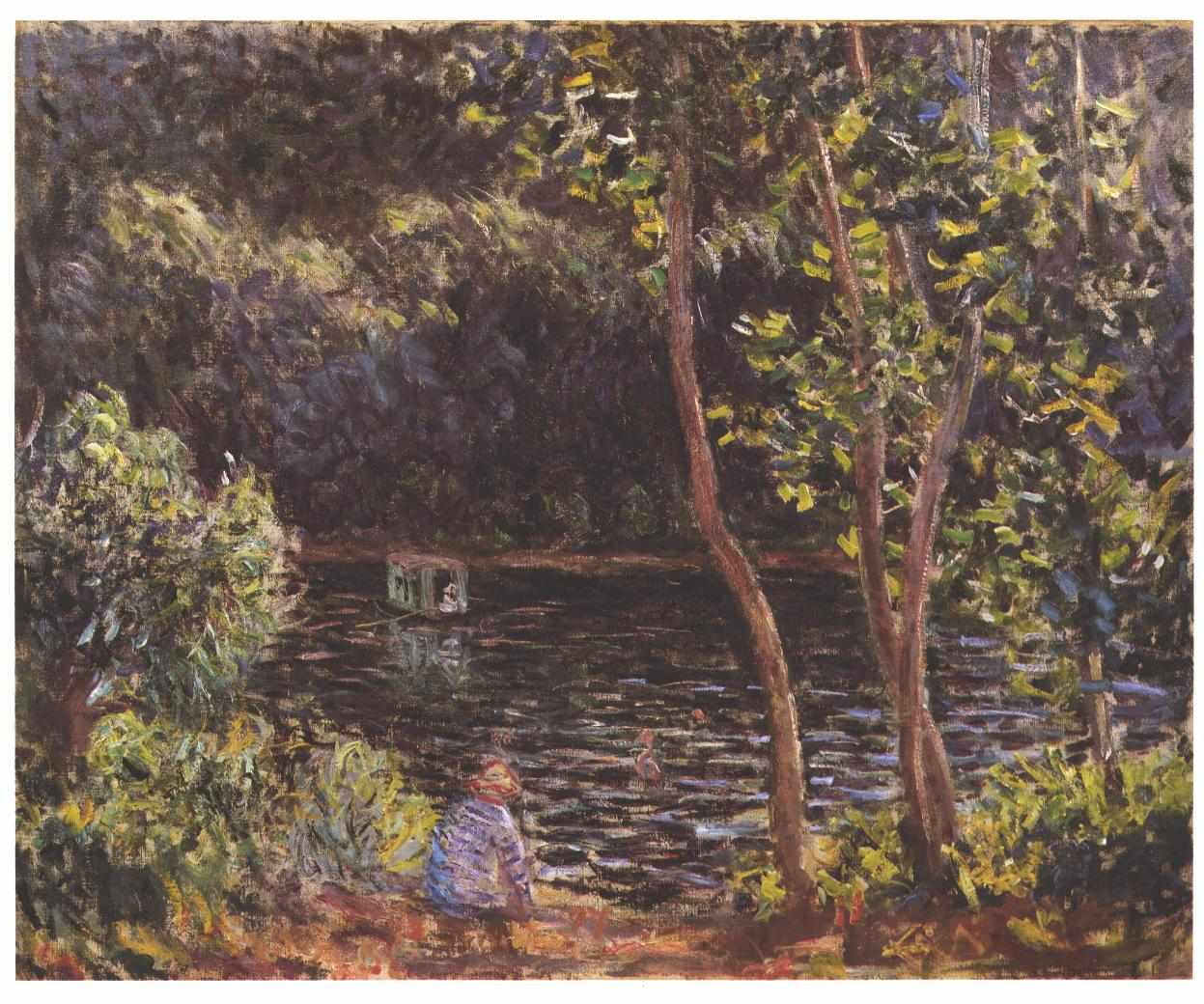
The Studio Boat, 1875

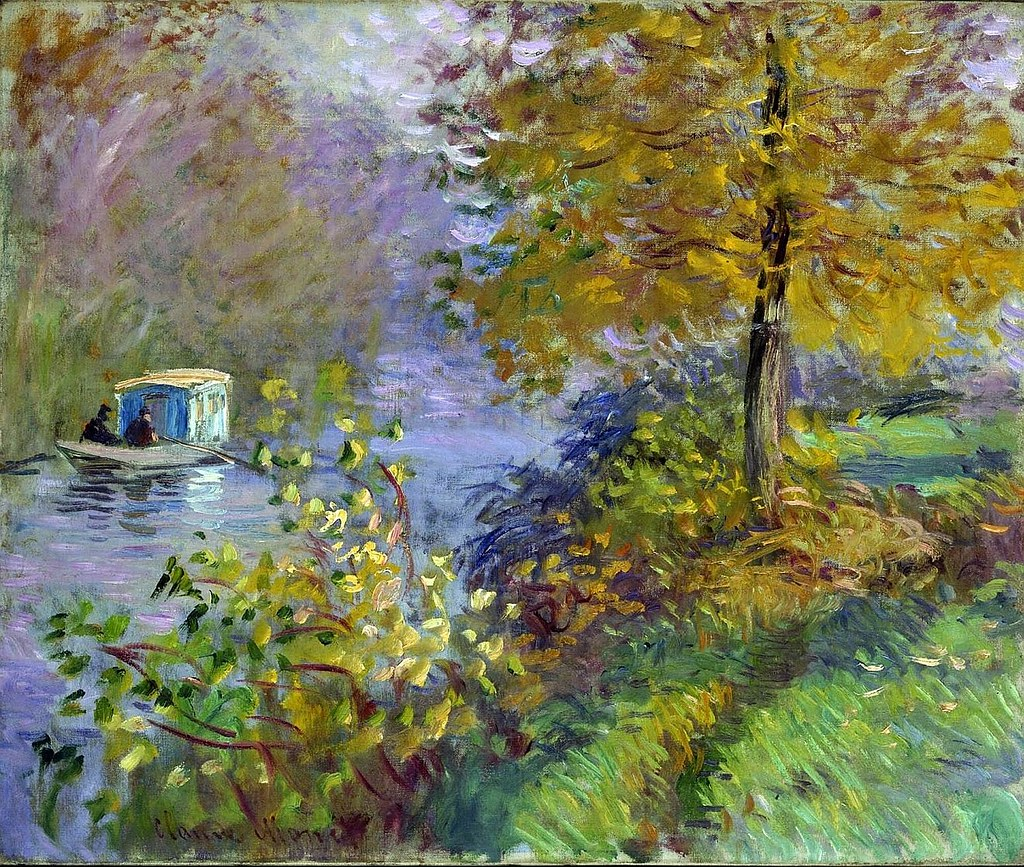
The Studio Boat, 1876

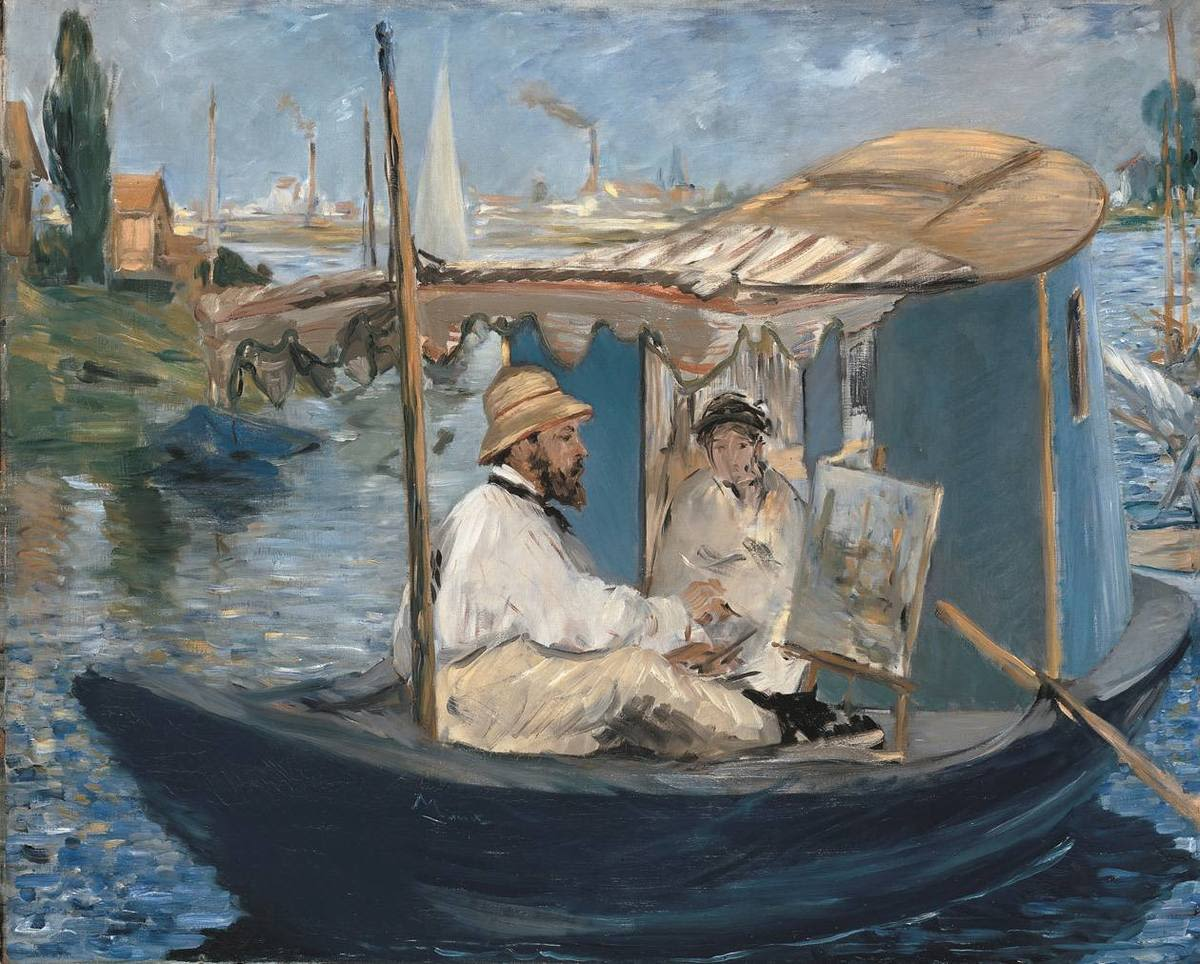
Édouard Manet - Monet Painting on His Studio Boat, 1874

== See also ==
- List of paintings by Claude Monet
- Claude Monet Painting in his Studio, 1874 painting of Monet in his boat
