= Derek Gillman =

American art director (born 1952)

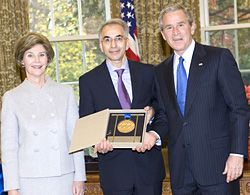
Derek Gillman (center) with George W. Bush and Laura Bush

Derek Anthony Gillman (born 7 December 1952) was executive director and president of the Barnes Foundation from August 2006 to January 2014. In 2014, Gillman took up a position at Drexel University as a distinguished visiting professor in the Department of Art & Art History and the Museum Leadership graduate program, and is now a distinguished teaching professor and executive director of university collections and exhibitions.

== Education ==
Gillman was educated at Clifton College, Magdalen College, Oxford (MA), and the University of East Anglia (LLM, 1996). He is author of The Idea of Cultural Heritage: A Liberal Perspective (Cambridge University Press, rev 3rd ed., 2026) and co-editor of The Preservation of Art and Culture in Times of War (Oxford University Press, 2022)

== Career ==
Gillman served as president and director of the Pennsylvania Academy of the Fine Arts from 2001 to 2006.
