= Larvex Corporation =

- Company type: Wholly owned subsidiary
- Industry: Chemical products
- Defunct: December 31, 1936
- Fate: Dissolved
- Products: Pesticides
- Parent: Zonite Products Corporation (1926-1936)

Larvex Corporation was a company which manufactured Spraying Larvex, a pest control product used in moth proofing woolen fabrics. The firm was acquired by Zonite Products Corporation in October 1926. Zonite added Rinsing Larvex to its line of products after the takeover was finalized. The pesticides were also referred to as Larvex liquid and cake.

Larvex Corporation continued as a subsidiary of Zonite Products Corporation until December 31, 1936. On this date Zonite Products Corporation informed the New York Stock Exchange that it was dissolving its six subsidiaries.
