= Argyrol =

Antiseptic containing compounded solutions of mild silver protein

Argyrol is the trade name for an antiseptic for mucous membranes which consists of compounded solutions of mild silver protein. Argyrol is synonymous with the chemical Mild Silver Protein (MSP) which is pharmaceutical grade for use in medicine and sterile processes. MSP is a molecule produced in the chemical industry in Europe, consisting of elemental silver conjugated along the helix of a denatured protein molecule derived from caseinate of strictly regulated certified livestock. Argyrol 10% is 20,000 ppm with particle sizing molecular range from <8 nm to average <14.3 nm. Argyrol is a local anti-infective most familiar for both ophthalmic and upper respiratory disinfection. Widely publicized for its value to resolve gonorrhea infections, it was known to prevent gonorrheal blindness and other pathogenic bacterial and viral infections to the eyes of newborn infants. Albert C. Barnes and Hermann Hille developed and commercialized Argyrol as a treatment and prevention technology that was less caustic than the existing silver antiseptics.

== History ==
Argyrol was first made commercially available in 1901 by the Barnes and Hille Chemists Company. The name has remained a registered trademark since Barnes' USPTO registration was first issued in 1902. In 1903, Medical News reported that Barnes had read a paper at the Tri-State Medical Society, in which he said Argyrol could be used to treat conjunctivitis, ophthalmia neonatorum, gonorrheal ophthalmia, otitis media, genitourinary infections and inflammations and urethritis. In April 1907, Barnes bought out Hille and organized the A.C. Barnes Company to continue the manufacture and global sales of Argyrol from three headquarters located in the United States, Great Britain, and Australia. Argyrol was never patented because Barnes instead strategized to define the mark as its molecule for antiseptic use and promote it exclusively through protection of his Argyrol trademark.

Argyrol disinfection of mucous membranes benefit became public health policy to the eyes of newborns, required on birth certificates. The Surgeon General of the United States mandated Argyrol disinfection against the Spanish Influenza pandemic of 1918, as noted in the DTRA December 2006 report regarding US troops stationed at the Presidio in San Francisco all remaining uninfected by the use of Argyrol. Newspapers during the pandemic informed the public of physician recommendation for the use of Argyrol to the nose and throat and 'spray stations' were established on the street in New York. Nebulization of Argyrol was implemented but it is extraordinary that very little mention of Argyrol is found in contemporary articles about the pandemic. Argyrol disinfection was instrumental as to how the 1918 pandemic was brought under control, in addition to the same safety measures implemented to reduce the infection rates of the pandemic in 2020. Argyrol disinfection also was mandated during quarantine against other diseases such as diphtheria and a variety of uses of Argyrol was the WWII advantage of US and Allied forces. Argyrol was World Health Organization Essentials Medicine listed since inception and into the first decade of the 21st century. Argyrol was in almost every First Aid Safety kit for the workplace, school nurses' offices and public health clinics until its manufacture was interrupted. Dr. Leila Denmark, co-creator of the pertussis (Whooping Cough) vaccine and a staunch advocate for the use of Argyrol in her book Every Child Deserves A Chance, noted the interruption of Argyrol's availability during the 1970s.

For World War II, Argyrol post-exposure male sexual hygiene was mandated by the U.S. and Allied armed forces for sexually transmitted venereal disease prevention. With the advent of antibiotics, prevention was replaced by the promise of cures by injection. Argyrol Anti-Infective was prescribed less often because Argyrol's 10% Stabilized Solution was available without a prescription. Pharmacies also compounded solutions of mild silver protein at varied strength and by prescription. Argyrol was an important treatment for ophthalmic infections and at least until 1943, was preferred over silver nitrate as well. Found effective and reliable for treatment of a range of conditions in human and veterinary medicine, the sales of the drug brought in steady profits for decades. Barnes used the money made when he owned Argyrol to accumulate a large art collection of mainly French Impressionist works which today form the core holding of the Barnes Foundation, an educational art institution established by his will. The paintings were valued in March 2010 at $25 billion.

Argyrol was manufactured by A.C. Barnes Company until the Zonite Products Corporation acquired the firm in 1929. Argyrol products also were dispensed in independent pharmacy-labelled bottles. A succession of only five entities acquired the Argyrol trademark registration over the decades, keeping alive the right to use the mark Argyrol as reflected in the public record of the USPTO, the foundation of WIPO. The Argyrol trademark was guarded to ensure the quality and protect the reputation of the drug by Barnes, which resulted in a particular protection under law issuing to Argyrol by legal decision in jurisprudence. Zonite Products Corporation rightfully cautioned their Argyrol buyers to beware of purchasing imitations of Argyrol which contained other competitive silver compounds that resembled Argyrol.

The silver protein molecule has been in clinical use for over 120 years with ample clinical data supporting its benefit and versatility. FOIA request of FDA noted no Argyrol adverse events reported during all that time. Although Argyrol is used as a synonym for the chemical descriptions silver vitelline and mild silver protein, Barnes insisted Argyrol was different. A silver-gelatin colloid, made by the reaction of silver nitrate, sodium hydroxide and gelatin, in which a complex colloidal aggregate is formed, Barnes could rightfully assert Argyrol differed in its chemical assay, for instance, as it was claimed to contain over 30% silver. When compounded in varying strengths, nevertheless Argyrol is silver protein identified as to its molecule stated in its mark description and Barnes was forced to accept the designation. Argyrol is an over-the-counter internationally recognized anti-infective drug that is drug regulatory compliant, immediate to manufacture and market distribution in all jurisdictions. Drug regulatory administrative adjudication by the US Food and Drug Administration to mandate New Drug Applications for all silver drugs in the class [Final Rule in 1999] resulted to effectively give Argyrol a monopoly, as Argyrol is the only OTC silver drug continuously in commerce in medicine since the 1901 date of launch by Barnes and Hille.

== See also ==
- Medical uses of silver – silver and silver colloids use in medical practice
- Ovoferrin – a tonic by the same company
