= Joseph Lapsley Wilson =

American military officer, railroad executive and horticulturist (1844–1928)

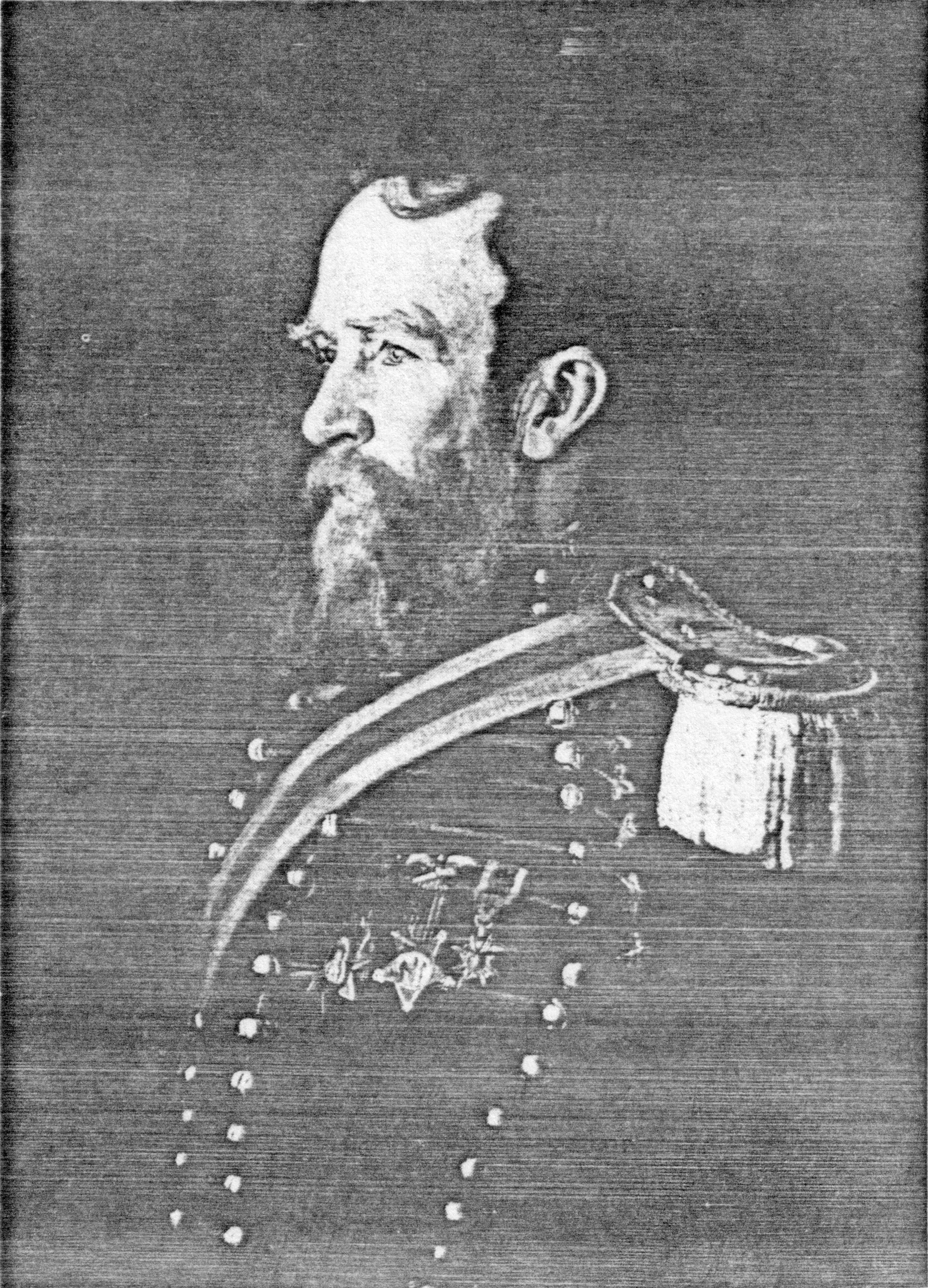
- Captain Joseph Lapsley Wilson by Thomas Eakins (circa 1895)
- Born: September 17, 1844; Philadelphia, Pennsylvania, U.S.
- Died: April 12, 1928 (aged 83)
- Burial place: Laurel Hill Cemetery, Philadelphia, Pennsylvania, U.S.
- Military career
- Allegiance: United States
- Branch: Union army Pennsylvania Army National Guard
- Service years: 1862–1867
- Rank: Sergeant, Captain
- Commands: First Troop Philadelphia City Cavalry
- Conflicts: American Civil War

Joseph Lapsley Wilson (September 17, 1844 – April 12, 1928) was an American military officer, railroad executive, and horticulturalist. He served in the Union army during the American Civil War and as captain of the First Troop Philadelphia City Cavalry from 1889 to 1894. He wrote two histories of the First Troop in 1875 and 1915. He worked as secretary of the Little Schuylkill Navigation, Railroad and Coal Company for 38 years. He collected over 200 specimens of rare plants he displayed at his estate which became the Arboretum of the Barnes Foundation where he served as the first director.

== Early life ==
Wilson was born in Philadelphia on September 17, 1844, and was educated at West Chester Academy in West Chester, Pennsylvania. His studies were interrupted in 1862, when he enlisted in the Union Army as a member of C Company Grays Reserves. He saw fire in July 1863 at Carlisle, Pennsylvania. He was discharged from the army in 1867 at the rank of sergeant.

== Career ==
He worked as secretary of the Little Schuylkill Navigation, Railroad and Coal Company, a division of the Reading Railroad, which transported anthracite from Northeastern Pennsylvania's coal region. He worked for the company for 38 years.

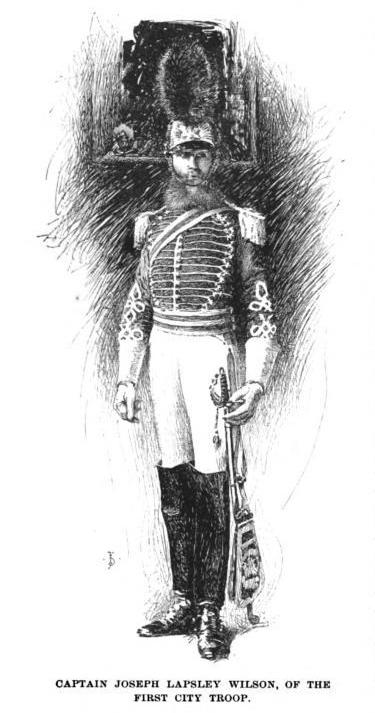
Captain Joseph Lapsley Wilson in an 1894 illustration from Harper's Magazine

In 1867, he was elected to the First Troop Philadelphia City Cavalry, the oldest continually-active military unit in the United States, and part of the Pennsylvania Army National Guard. He served as the troop's captain from 1889 to 1894. He wrote its centennial history in 1875. Forty years later, he revised and updated the history: Book of the First Troop, Philadelphia City Cavalry, 1774-1914 (1915).

In the late 1870s, he bought land in Merion, Pennsylvania, and built a mansion named "Red Slates". Inspired by the rare plants he observed at the Centennial Exposition, he collected over 200 specimens of plants and turned his property into an arboretum. In 1901, he married Caroline Alice Yates.

In 1922, he sold the estate to Dr. Albert C. Barnes, and he and his wife moved to a smaller house on the property. Barnes demolished the mansion to build his art gallery, but preserved the arboretum. Wilson served as the arboretum's first director and as a Barnes Foundation trustee, until his death. Barnes named the road in front of the property Lapsley Lane in honor of Wilson. Some of trees planted by Wilson trees still survive at the Arboretum of the Barnes Foundation.

He was a member of the Pennsylvania Commandery of the Military Order of the Loyal Legion of the United States, the Pennsylvania Horticultural Society, the Radnor Hunt Club, the Union League of Philadelphia and the National Republican League. He was a member of the Indian Rights Association, and opposed American imperialism.

He died on April 12, 1928, and was interred at Laurel Hill Cemetery in Philadelphia.
