= Annette's Perfect Cleanser Company =

- Company type: Subsidiary
- Industry: Cleaning
- Defunct: 1937
- Fate: Acquired
- Headquarters: Boston, Massachusetts, United States
- Products: Laundry detergent
- Parent: Zonite Products Corporation

Annette's Perfect Cleanser Company was a 1930s era firm which manufactured a dry powder which was useful for removing spots and stains from clothing.

== Overview ==
The F.W. Woolworth Company featured the cleaning item in full window displays. Packages of the powder sold for $0.10, $0.25, and $0.50 in 1932.

Based in Boston, Massachusetts, Annette's Perfect Cleanser Company was acquired by Zonite Products Corporation in March 1932.

== Succession ==
In January 1937, Zonite Products Corporation notified the New York Stock Exchange that it was dissolving its fully owned subsidiaries, including Annette's Perfect Cleanser Company.

As of December 31, 1936, Zonite Products Corporation succeeded to all of the assets and assumed all of the obligations of its subsidiaries.

== See also ==
- Purex (laundry detergent)
