= Barnes Arboretum at Saint Joseph's University =

Arboretum in Merion, Pennsylvania, United States

Coordinates: 39.998076°N 75.241914°W

The Barnes Arboretum at Saint Joseph’s University
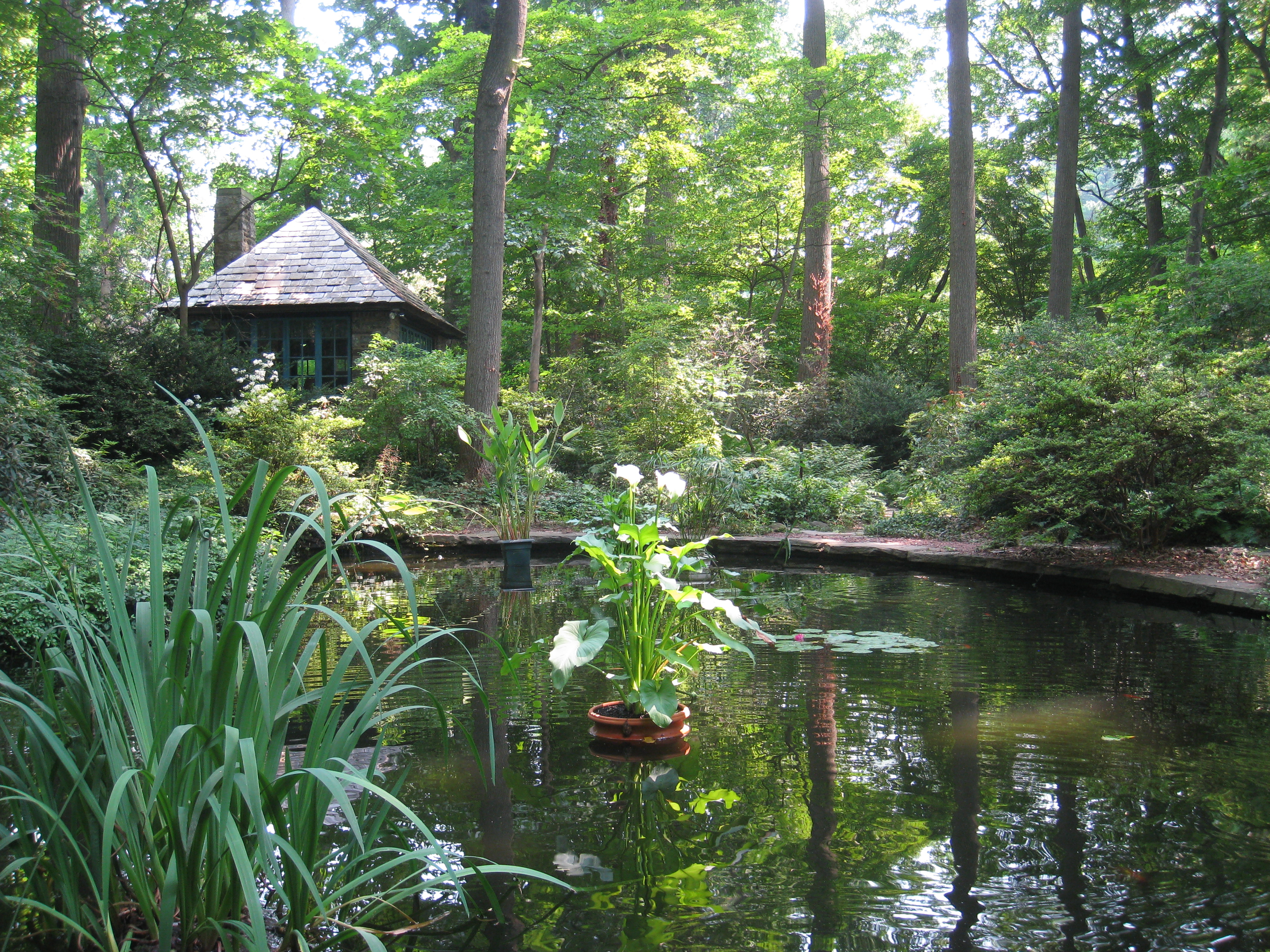
- A pond in the arboretum
- Interactive map of The Barnes Arboretum at Saint Joseph’s University
- Type: Arboretum
- Location: Merion, Pennsylvania
- Area: 12 acres (4.9 ha)

The Barnes Arboretum at Saint Joseph’s University, previously known as The Arboretum of the Barnes Foundation, 12 acres (4.9 ha) is an arboretum and the former site of the Barnes Foundation art gallery located at 300 North Latch's Lane, Merion, Pennsylvania, with entrance at 50 Lapsley Lane.

Since 2018 the adjacent Saint Joseph's University has managed the arboretum and its educational programs under a lease agreement with the foundation. Now known as the Barnes Arboretum at Saint Joseph's University, the arboretum is open to visitors Monday through Friday when the university is open, but for walk-in visitors only. The Barnes Arboretum is open to the public every Monday to Friday 830 AM - 530 PM and 1100 AM - 530 PM on Saturday and Sunday except when the University is closed. No reservations or tickets are required to enjoy the grounds.

== History ==
The arboretum was begun in the 1880s by Captain Joseph Lapsley Wilson. The site was purchased by the Barnes Foundation in 1922, whereupon Wilson became the arboretum's director and a foundation trustee until his death in 1928.

Over time, the arboretum has expanded its collection to over 3,000 species/varieties of woody plants, a herbarium housing 10,000 specimens, and a library of some 2,500 volumes. The arboretum school was established in 1940.

== Collections ==
The arboretum contains good collections of Aesculus, Cotoneaster, Cornus, crab apples, ornamental ferns, lilac, Lonicera, Magnolia, peony, Quercus, Phellodendron, Rhododendron, Stewartia, and Viburnum, as well as notable specimens of Ginkgo biloba, Calocedrus decurrens, Cunninghamia lanceolata, Sequoia sempervirens, and Trochodendron aralioides. Other plants of interest include Araucaria araucana, Davidia involucrata, and Parrotia persica.

The site also contains a formal rose and perennial garden, woodland, lawns, pond, stream, and a greenhouse (reconstructed in 2002) containing about 250 varieties of plants.

== See also ==
- Barnes Foundation
- List of botanical gardens in the United States
