= Zonite Products Corporation =

NYC-based company since 1922

- Founded: 1922; 104 years ago
- Headquarters: Chrysler Building, New York, New York, United States

Zonite Products Corporation was a New York City-based company formed in 1922. Headquartered in the Chrysler Building, it became a leader in the medical preparations' field starting in 1930. In February 1930, it purchased for $215,000 the New Brunswick manufacturing plant of Reichardt Cocoa & Chocolate Company. By April 1931, Zonite's subsidiaries became concentrated in a single production facility. These included Zonite, Forhan's toothpaste and antiseptic, Argyrol, and Larvex. Annette's Perfect Cleanser Company was acquired in March 1932.

In November 1955, Zonite Products Corporation changed its name to Chemway Corporation. A corporate reorganization called for the creation of four separate divisions of the firm. The four sectors of the company were the Zonite division for trademark drugs, Larvex division for household products, Crookes Laboratories for ethical drugs, and Lady Esther division for cosmetics.
