= John Vickers (abolitionist) =

American Quaker, potter and abolitionist

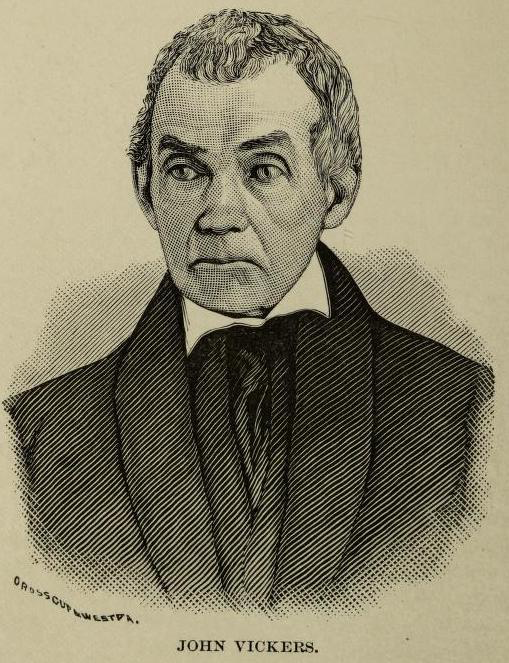
- John Vickers
- Born: August 8, 1780; Caln Township, Pennsylvania, U.S.
- Died: April 28, 1860 (aged 79); Chester County, Pennsylvania, U.S.
- Occupation: Potter
- Known for: Participant in the Underground Railroad; Quaker
- Spouse: Abigail Paxson (m. 1803; died 1840)
- Children: Paxson Vickers, Mary Vickers

External videos
- Vickers Pottery & the Underground Railroad, Landis Valley Museum Collection

John Vickers (August 8, 1780 – April 28, 1860) was an American Quaker and abolitionist who participated in the Underground Railroad by providing refuge for fugitive slaves on his property in Chester County, Pennsylvania, and other locations. John Vickers was a principal agent in the Northern Route of the Underground Railway through Chester County.

Vickers worked as a farmer and potter, following his father Thomas Vickers at Thomas Vickers and Son Pottery. He in turn passed on his own pottery business, John Vickers and Son Pottery, to his son Paxson Vickers.

The historic Vickers farmhouse in Lionville became the Vickers Restaurant from 1972 to 2021, and reopened as the fifth location of the White Dog Cafe in 2024.

== Life and pottery business ==
John Vickers was born on August 8, 1780, to Quakers Thomas Vickers Jr. (1757–1829) and Jemima Mendenhall (1757–1851) in East Caln Township, Chester County, Pennsylvania. Thomas Vickers was an original member of the Pennsylvania Anti-Slavery Society, formed in 1777 under the leadership of Benjamin Franklin. The Vickers family were active members of the Uwchlan Meetinghouse and the Uwchlan Anti-Slavery Society.

By 1796, Thomas Vickers had established Caln pottery in a "pot house" on his farm in East Caln Township in Chester County. He used clay from deposits of clay near the pottery and also bought clay from his neighbors. The family business produced a wide variety of glazed and unglazed pottery including red earthenware, black glazed pottery, green enameled ware, cream-colored queensware and Sgraffito ware. Pieces appear in collections including the Philadelphia Museum of Art, the New York Historical Society, and Winterthur Museum and Gardens. Some examples of Vickers' redware and sgraffito work are now considered "Very Rare and Valuable".

John Vickers married Abigail Paxson on October 6, 1803, at Sadsbury Friends Meeting House, Gap, Pennsylvania. Abigail Paxson was born July 23, 1776 and died December 12, 1818. The couple had at least 9 children: Martha, Ann, Joseph, Jonathan, Jemima, Mary, Aaron, Abigail, and Paxson.

John Vickers and his younger brothers Ziba and Isaac joined the family pottery business, which was known as Thomas Vickers and Son Pottery. John remained his father's partner until 1814, when Ziba succeeded John as partner. In 1814, John moved to West Whiteland where he established a farm and a new pottery. He sold this property in 1822.

In 1823, John Vickers moved to Lionville, Uwchlan Township, Pennsylvania, where he purchased "5 Acres and 66 perches" of land from Andrew Hall at a cost of $800. Thomas Vickers had closed the Caln pottery in 1820. In 1823 he joined his son at John Vickers and Son Pottery in Lionville. John Vickers & Son produced about $2,800 worth of pottery annually, a substantial operation for the time.

John Vickers was clerk of the Cain Monthly and Quarterly Meetings before he moved to Uwchlan, and later served as an elder and overseer of the Uwchlan Monthly Meeting. He died on April 28, 1860.

John Vickers passed on the family pottery business to his son Paxson Vickers, who began to work with him in 1835. After the death of Paxon Vickers, his widow Ann (Lewis) Vickers took over the pottery business, to be succeeded in turn by Paxson and Ann's son, the fourth generation in the family business, also named John Vickers. Vickers Pottery is variously reported to have operated until 1865 the 1870s or the 1880s.

== Participation in the Underground Railroad ==
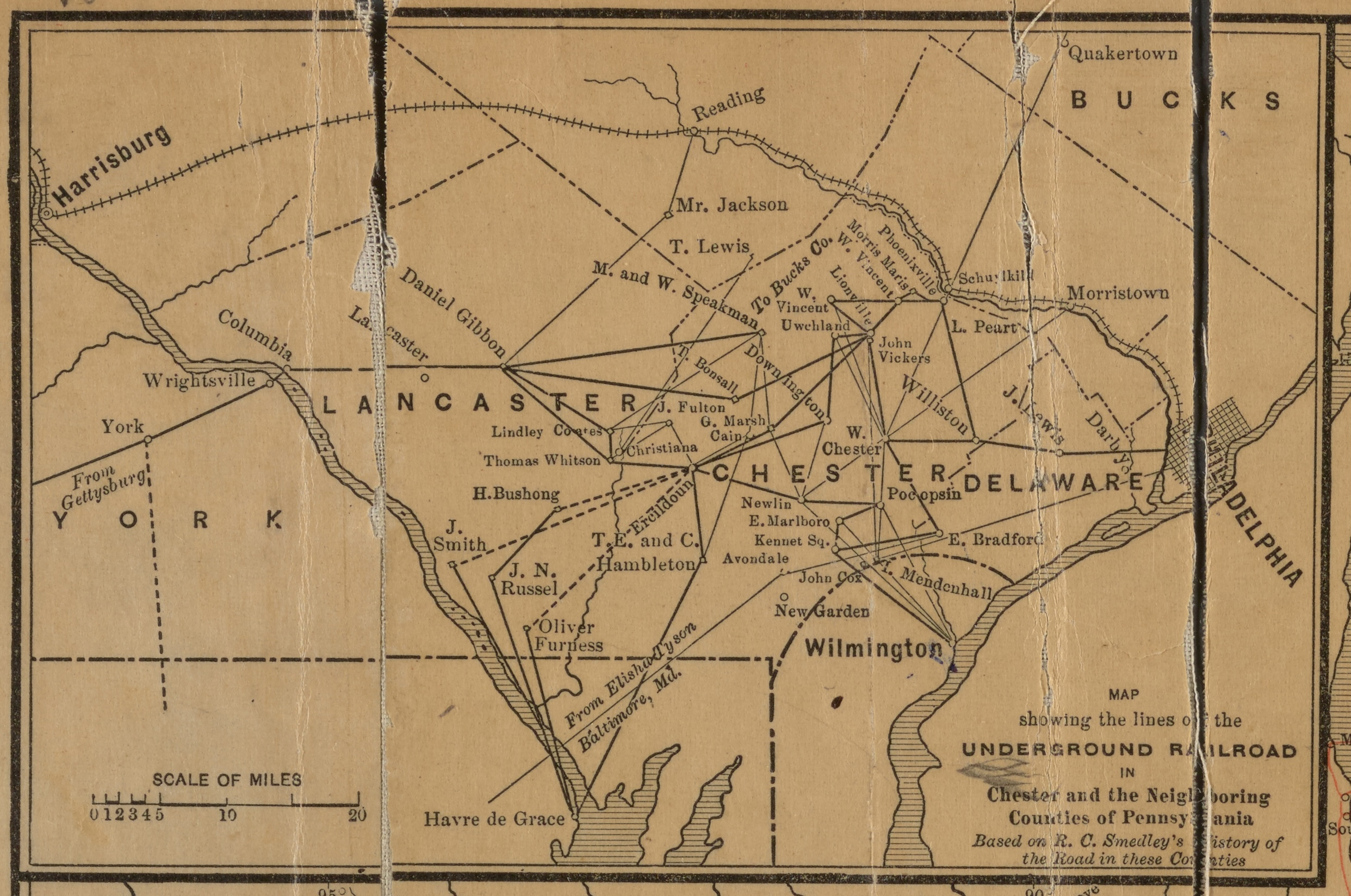
Underground railroad routes in Chester County, The Underground Railroad from slavery to freedom (1898)

Both John Vickers and his father Thomas Vickers Jr. were principal agents in the Northern Route of the Underground Railway through Chester County. Many other family members were also engaged in these efforts, including John's daughters Mary and Abigail (Abbie) and his son Paxson and Paxson's wife Ann. As shown in the inset map from The Underground Railroad from slavery to freedom (1898), John Vicker's home in Lionville was at an important conjunction of routes in Chester County. It was a central station, connecting routes to the north, Lancaster County, Kennett Square, and the southeast.

The Vickers home in Lionville was near a public road, making it difficult to move people in and out during the day without being seen. Groups of people were brought in at night, to be fed and helped by family members. The house contained a crawl space where people could be hidden. They were also hidden in the kiln used to fire pottery, in the large wood piles, in the woods or at other farms. They could later be hidden in the straw-packed wagons for transporting pottery and be driven to further stations to the north and west. John Vickers often signed letters of introduction to further stations as "thy friend Pot." Sometimes people stayed with the Vickers for weeks or years, working and obtaining an education at local schools or from his daughter Mary Vickers.

Many accounts of the Vickers' activities are recorded in the History of the Underground Railroad (1883). Vickers often used tactics to delay those searching for escapees, such as helping to carry out time-consuming searches of his entire house while fugitives escaped through the woods. One night, John Vickers, his daughter Abigail, and two escaped women were overturned on their way to Philadelphia in the Vickers' dearborn carriage. The fugitives hid in the woods while the Vickers and a local tavernkeeper arranged for the loan of another vehicle and repairs to the carriage. Then they continued their journey, arriving about two hours later than expected. Had they been detected, the penalties for helping the escapees under the Fugitive Slave Law were set at $1000 per person.

People who sent fugitive slaves to John Vickers included Dr. J. K. Eshleman of Downington and Thomas Bonsall of Wagontown and Christiana. Bonsall, known to be active in the Underground Railroad for 33 years, regularly hid fugitives in his barn and sent them on to Vickers via a free black conductor, John Price. Another person who brought fugitives to the Vickers house was Sarah Marsh, daughter of Gravener and Hannah Marsh. Nearby stations also included White Horse Farm, the home of Elijah Pennypacker; the home of Zebulon Thomas in Downingtown; and Fitzwater Station in Phoenixville, the home of Abel and Isabel Fitzwater.

== The Vickers farmhouse ==
In 1972 the Vickers farmhouse became the Vickers Restaurant, opened by Arturo Burigatto. Visitors to the restaurant have included former President Richard Nixon (a descendant of John Vickers' sister Martha), musicians Hall & Oates, and actor David Niven. The Vickers Restaurant was sold in 1999, but was repurchased by Burigatto in 2008. It closed for a second time in 2021. The street address of the Vickers Restaurant was 192 East Welsh Pool Road, Exton, Pennsylvania.

After the closure of the Vickers Restaurant, the Vickers farmhouse was bought by Marty Grims (owner of the White Dog Cafe, among others) and his daughter Syndney. In June 2024, the White Dog Cafe opened its fifth location at the Vickers farmhouse, following nearly three years of renovation. The dining room and drawing-room are original to John Vickers' 1823 farmhouse, and include original brick flooring. Located on the corner of East Welsh Pool Road and Gordon Drive, the restaurant's official street address is 181 Gordon Dr, Exton, PA.

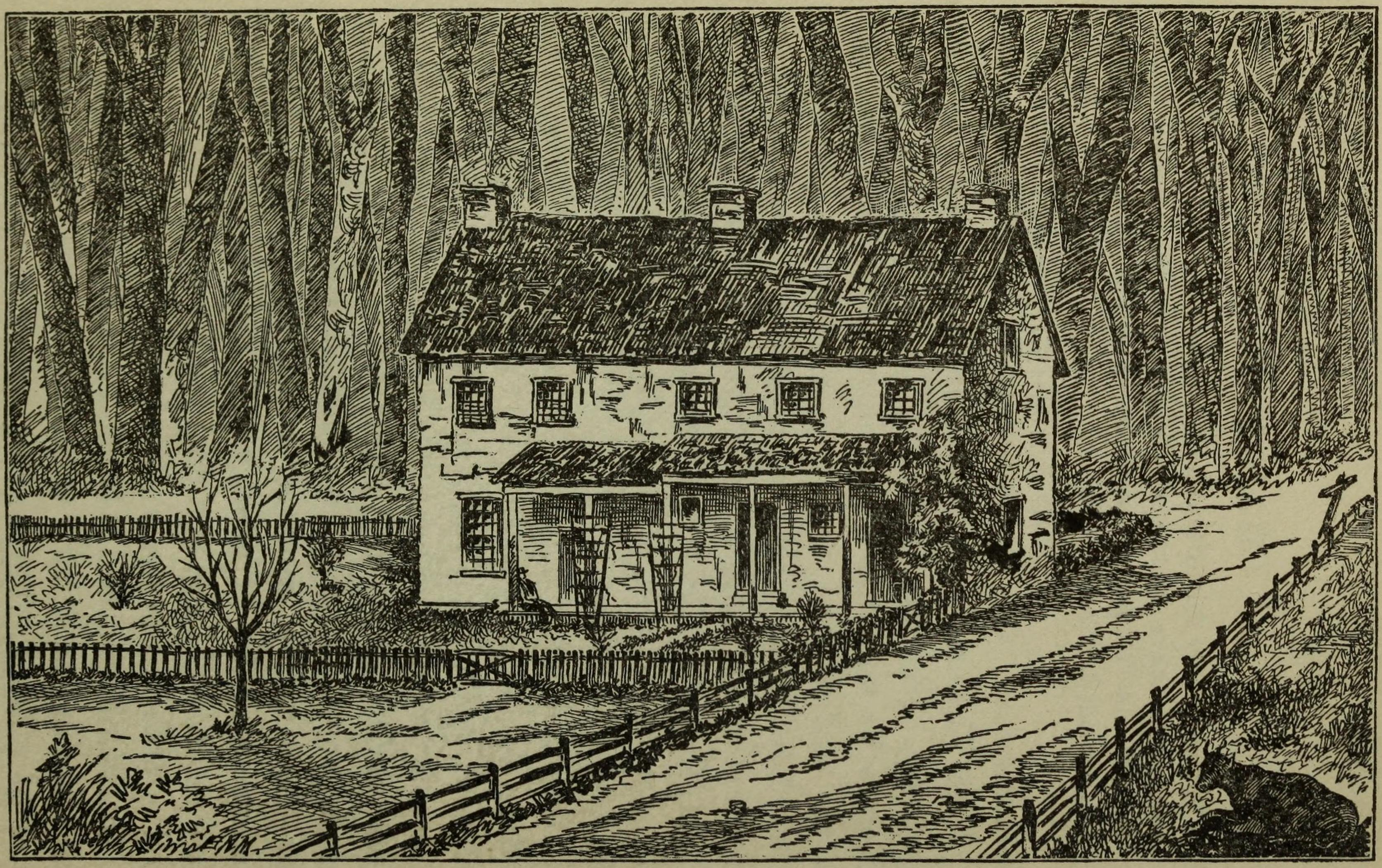
Residence of John Vickers, History of the Underground Railroad, 1883

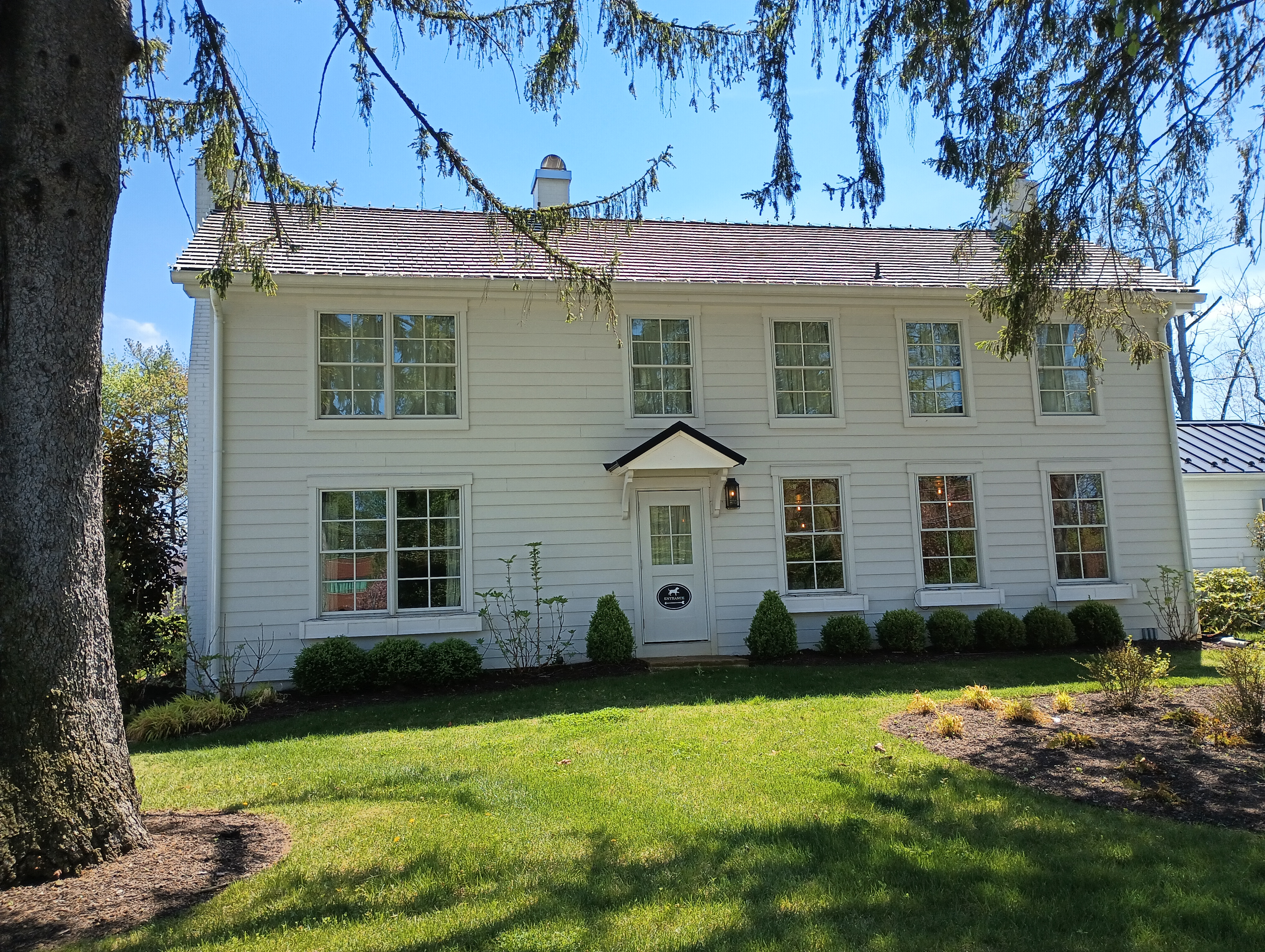
Frontage of John Vickers farmhouse, now the White Dog Cafe, 2026

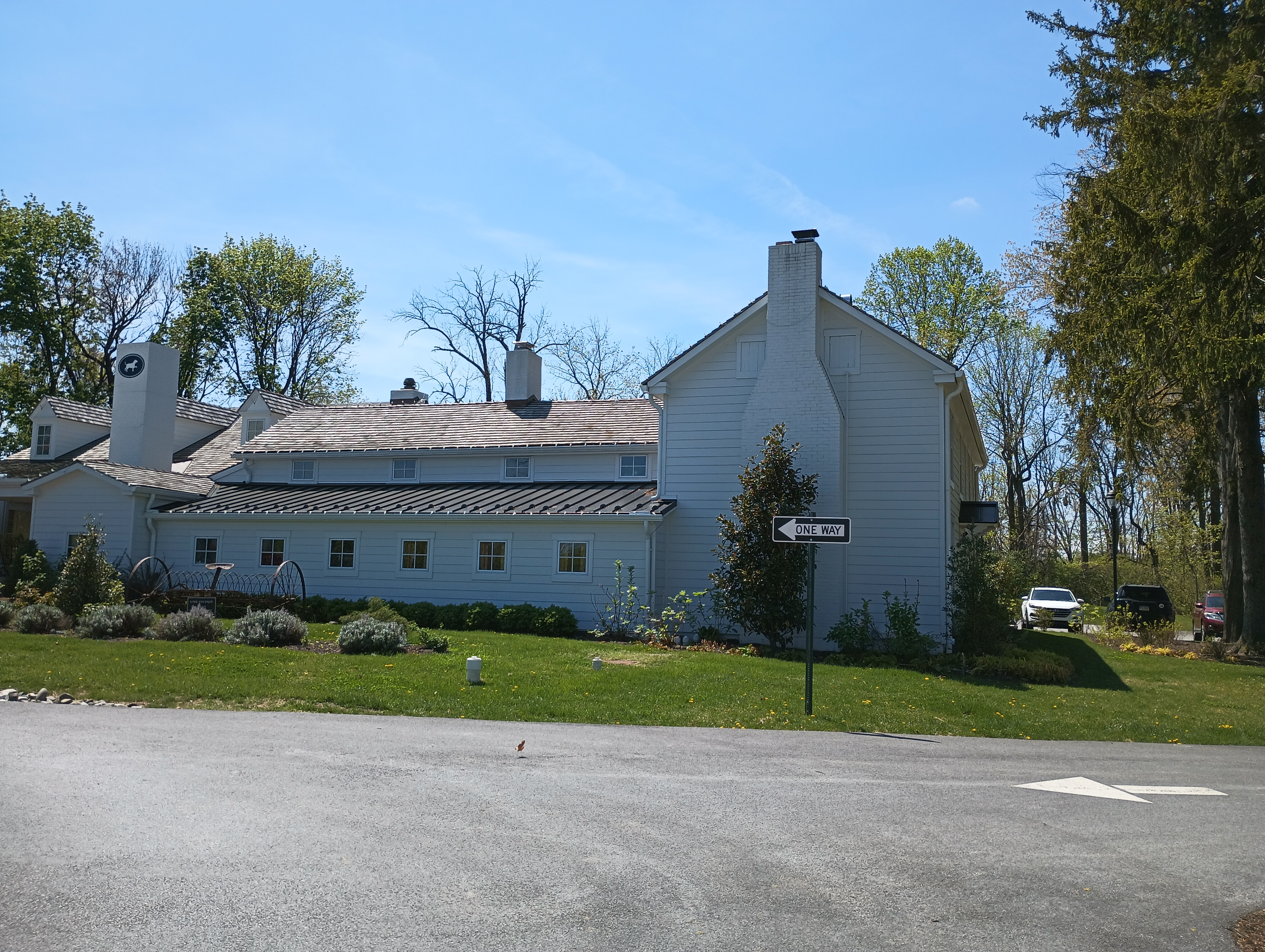
White Dog Cafe exterior, 2026 (side view)

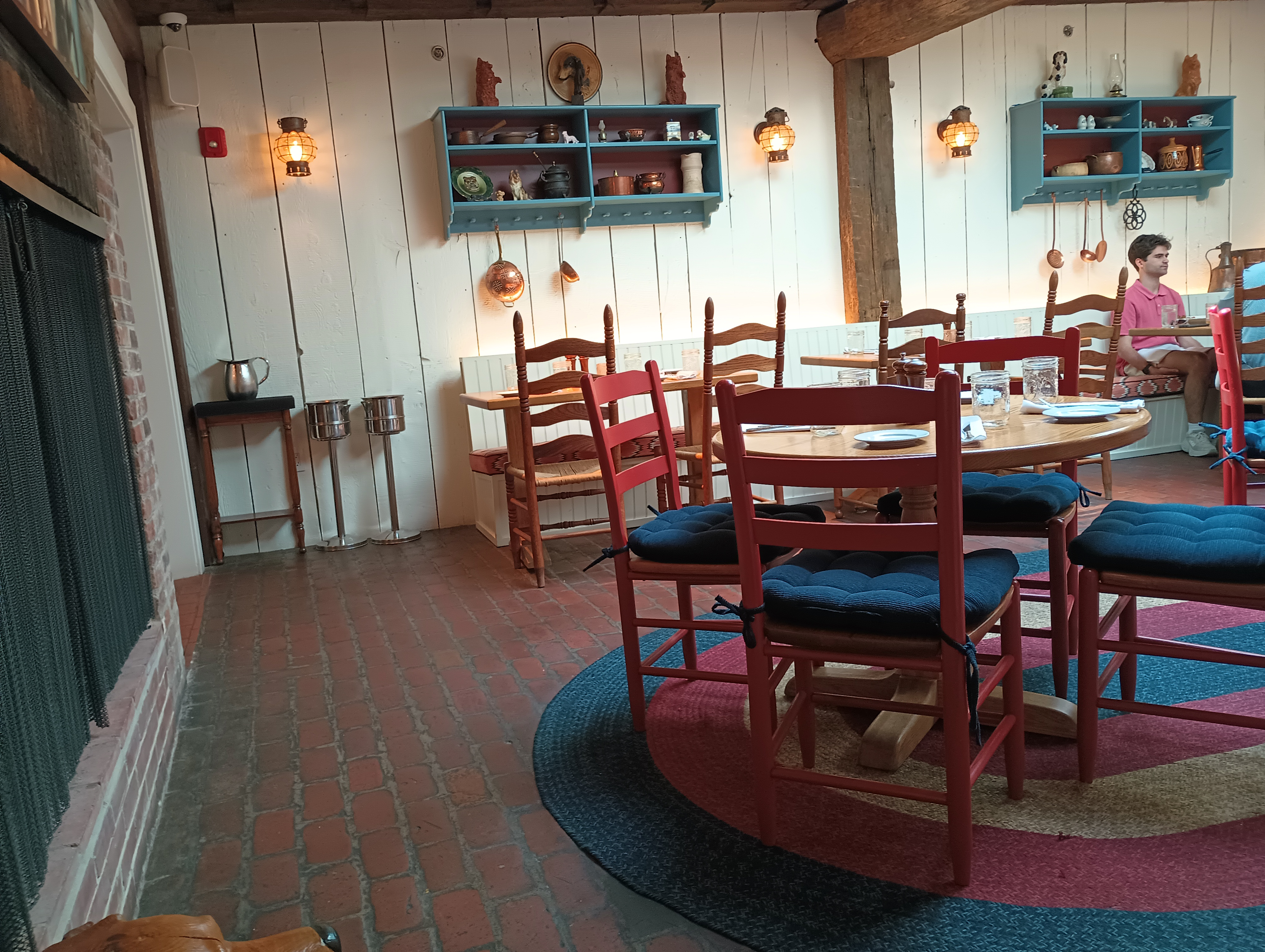
White Dog Cafe interior, showing original farmhouse floor

== External links and further reading ==
- Declaration of Sentiments of the American Anti-Slavery Society
- Smedley, R. C. (1883). History of the Underground Railroad in Chester and the Neighboring Counties of Pennsylvania. Lancaster, Pa., Office of the Journal. pp. 144–163.
