= Brian Kelly =

Brian Kelly may refer to:

== Entertainment ==
- Brian Kelly (actor) (1931–2005), television actor best known for his role in the US TV series Flipper
- Brian Kelly (director), British television director
- Brian Kelly (editor) (born 1954), American journalist and author
- Brian Kelly (blogger), American travel blogger and founder of The Points Guy

== Sports ==
=== Association football ===
- Brian Kelly (footballer, born 1937) (1937–2013), English professional footballer active in the 1950s
- Brian Kelly (footballer, born 1943) (1943–2018), English professional footballer active in the 1960s
- Brian Kelly (American soccer) (born 1974), U.S. soccer midfielder

=== Gridiron football ===
- Brian Kelly (wide receiver) (born 1956), Canadian football Hall of Famer
- Brian Kelly (American football coach) (born 1961), American college football coach
- Brian Kelly (cornerback) (born 1976), American football cornerback

=== Other sports ===
- Brian Kelly (Australian footballer) (1917–1985), Australian rules footballer and coach
- Brian Kelly (boxer) (1938–2016), American boxer
- Brian Kelly (lacrosse) (born 1980), American lacrosse player
- Brian Kelly (Gaelic footballer) (born 1990), Irish sportsperson
- Brian Kelly (rugby league) (born 1996), Australian rugby league footballer

== Others ==
- Brian T. Kelly (born 1960s), United States Air Force general
- Brian Kelly (chess player) (born 1978), English chess international master
- Brian Kelly (historian) (born 1958), American historian at Queen's University Belfast

== See also ==
- Bryan Kelly (1934–2026), British composer
- Bryan Kelly (baseball) (born 1959), American baseball pitcher
- Brian Kelley (disambiguation)
