= Uwchlan =

Uwchlan may refer to:

- Uwchlan Township, Pennsylvania
- Upper Uwchlan Township, Pennsylvania
