= Paxson Vickers =

American politician (died 1865)

Member of the Pennsylvania House of Representatives from the Chester County district
- In office 1857–1857 Serving with Ebenezer V. Dickey and James Penrose
- Preceded by: Andrew Buchanan, Joseph Dowdall, Robert Irwin
- Succeeded by: John Hodgson, Eber W. Sharpe, Morton Garrett

Personal details
- Died: October 22, 1865
- Party: Republican
- Spouse: Ann Lewis
- Children: Sara Louisa
- Occupation: Politician; pottery manufacturer

Paxson Vickers (died October 22, 1865) was an American politician and pottery manufacturer from Pennsylvania. He served as a member of the Pennsylvania House of Representatives, representing Chester County in 1857.

== Early life ==
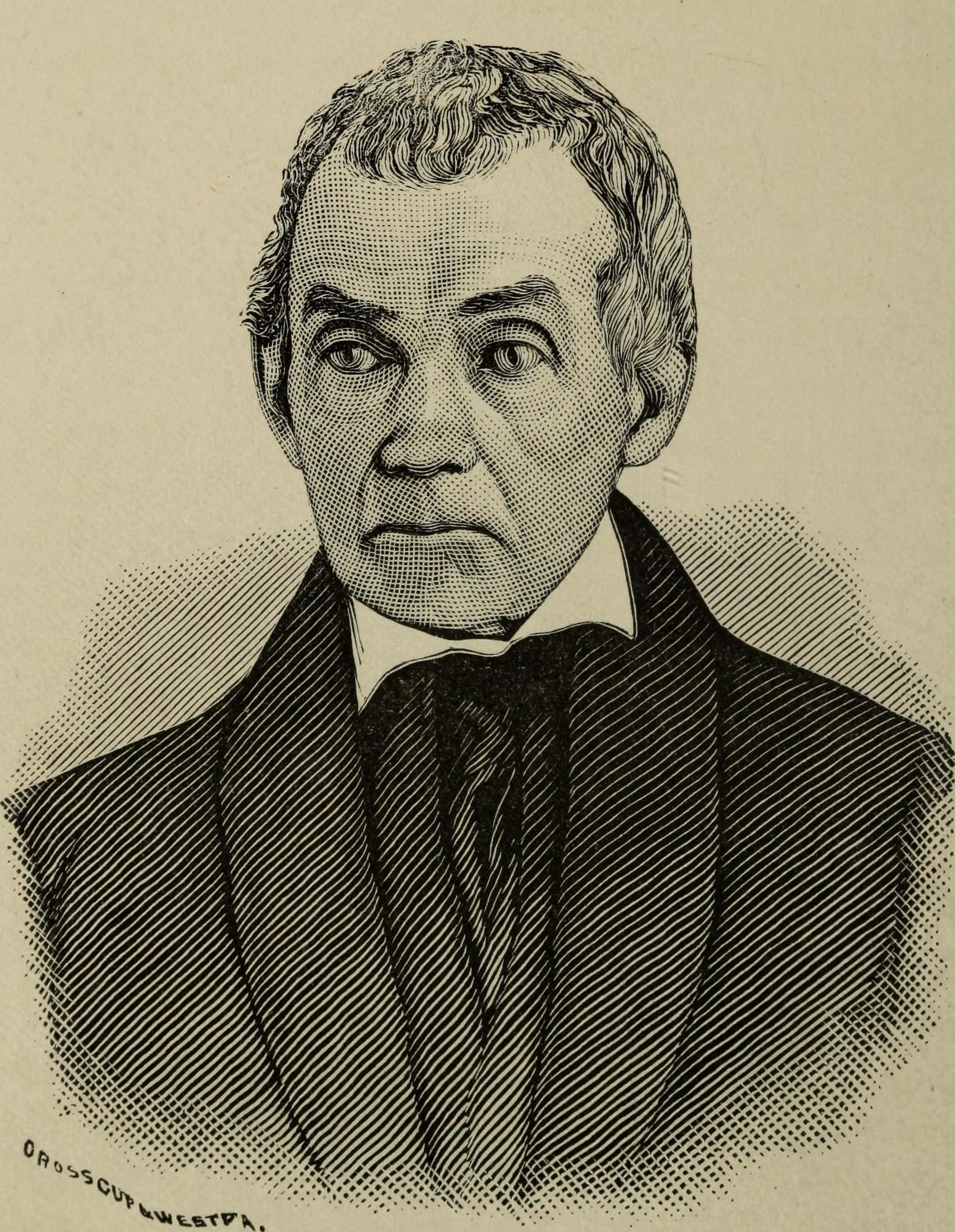
Drawing of his father John Vickers (1883)

Paxson Vickers was born to Abigail (née Paxson) and John Vickers. His father manufactured pottery and was a Quaker and a member of the Underground Railroad in Caln Township, Pennsylvania.

== Career ==
Vickers followed his father as a pottery manufacturer in Lionville.

Vickers was a Republican. He served as a member of the Pennsylvania House of Representatives, representing Chester County in 1857.

== Personal life ==
Vickers married Ann Lewis. They had at least three children, including John, Sara Louisa and a daughter who died in July 1865. His daughter Sara was a writer.

Vickers accidentally shot himself in the knee in the fall of 1865. He died a few weeks later from his wound on October 22, 1865, aged 48 or 49.
