= Lionville Historic District =

Historic district in Pennsylvania, United States

- U.S. National Register of Historic Places
- U.S. Historic district
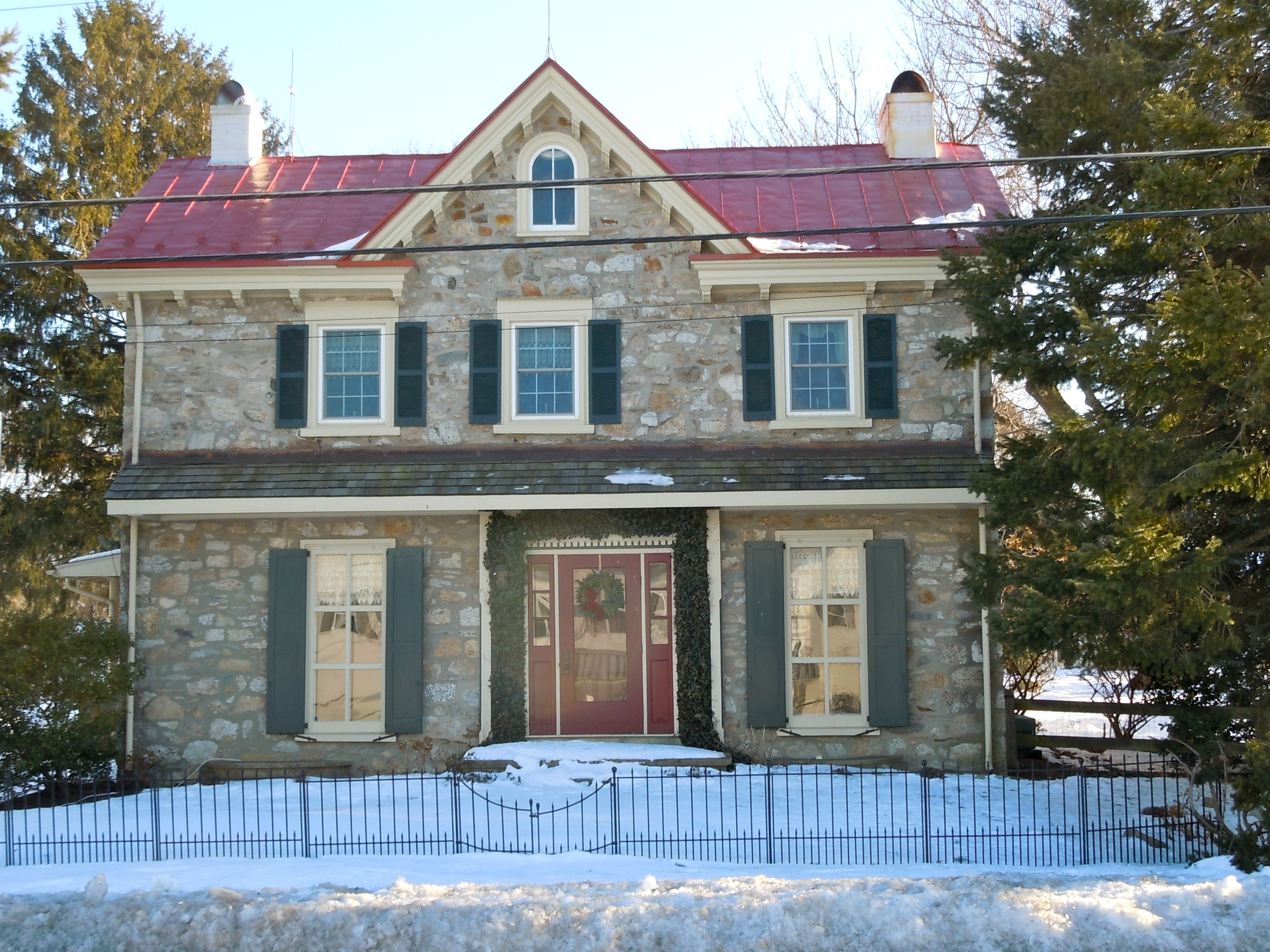
- House in the Lionville Historic District, February 2011

- Location within Pennsylvania Location within the United States
- Location: Mansion Road, Lionville, Uwchlan Township, Pennsylvania
- Coordinates: 40°03′16″N 75°39′33″W
- Area: 71 acres (29 ha)
- Built: 1712
- Architectural style: Bungalow/craftsman, Italianate, Classical Revival
- NRHP reference No.: 80003459
- Added to NRHP: December 1, 1980

The Lionville Historic District is a national historic district that is located in Uwchlan Township, Pennsylvania, United States.

It was added to the National Register of Historic Places in 1980.

== History and architectural features ==
This district includes thirty-nine contributing buildings that are located in the crossroads community of Lionville. The buildings date to the eighteenth and nineteenth centuries and include a variety of residential, commercial, and institutional buildings and outbuildings. Notable buildings include the Cadwalader House, Vaughan House, Red Lion Tavern (1740, 1815), Uwchlan Meeting House (1756), Wagonseller House, John Biedler Jr. Farmhouse (1811-1813), St. Paul's Parsonage (1813), Lionville Fire Company (1911), Joel Hawley Store (1834), Edith P. Moore School House, and former St. Paul's Lutheran Church (now known as The Nurtury).

David Lloyd was the first to sell large and small lots in the area. A Welshman and friend of William Penn, Lloyd came from Welsh Pool, and the town took that name, although a pool was never in what is now Lionville. As travelers began using the roads in Chester County, many inns were built. One was the Red Lyon Inn, identifiable in the village by its colorful sign for the many people who could not read. First a log cabin, it was rebuilt in 1725 using red brick and offered respite to drovers until 1888. While men slept in the house, cattle bedded down in lots next to the inn.

Red Lyon also became the village name until 1826 when the post office opened; however, since several towns named Red Lyon had already been established in Pennsylvania, residents chose to name their village as Lionville. Post offices at the time were located in the postmaster's private home and moved as different people became postmaster. Mail arrived once a week by horseback and, later, several times a week by stagecoach.

John Vickers' homestead, northeast on Welsh Pool Road, became a notable village landmark. In 1822, his family began making pottery, using skills learned from their grandfather and father. John Vickers was also known as an abolitionist and an active member of the Underground Railroad. His father, Thomas, was an original member of the Pennsylvania Anti-Slavery Society, that was formed in Philadelphia in 1777 with Benjamin Franklin as its first president.
