= Sara Louisa Oberholtzer =

American poet, novelist, and school savings bank advocate (1841–1930)

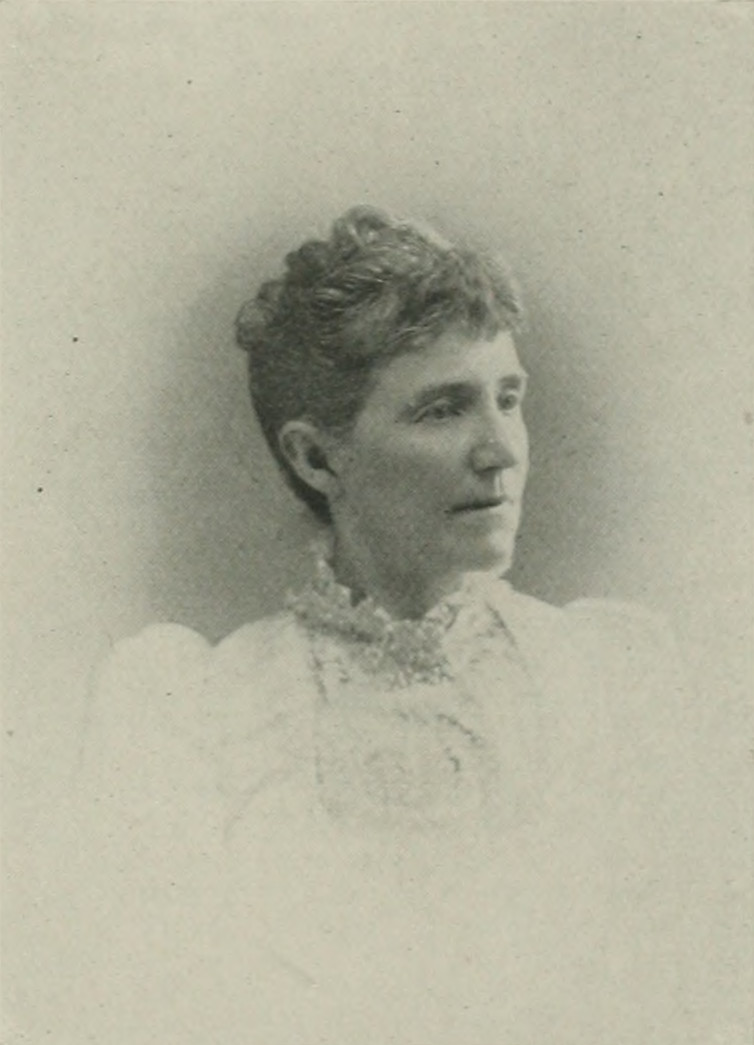
- "A Woman of the Century"
- Born: Sara Louisa Vickers; May 20, 1841; Uwchlan Township, Pennsylvania, U.S.
- Died: February 2, 1930 (aged 88)
- Resting place: West Laurel Hill Cemetery, Bala Cynwyd, Pennsylvania, U.S.
- Education: Thomas' Friends Boarding School, State Normal School in Millersville
- Occupations: Poet; activist; economist
- Spouse: John Oberholtzer (m. 1862)
- Children: 2 including Ellis Paxson Oberholtzer
- Parent: Paxson Vickers (father)
- Writing career
- Language: English
- Movement: Temperance

Sara Louisa Oberholtzer (née , Vickers; May 20, 1841 – February 2, 1930) was an American poet, novelist, and advocate for school savings banks. She was elected World's Superintendent of School Savings Banks for the Woman's Christian Temperance Union and was instrumental in establishing school savings banks in the United States, Canada, Australia and the Sandwich Islands.

== Early life and education ==
She was born Sara Louisa Vickers on May 20, 1841, in Uwchlan Township, Pennsylvania, to Quakers and abolitionists Ann T. and Paxson Vickers. The family assisted hundreds of fugitive slaves en route to Canada and entertained guests at their house including John G. Whittier, Lucretia Mott, William Lloyd Garrison, and Bayard Taylor.

She was educated by private tutors., at Thomas' Friends Boarding School, and at Millersvillle State Normal School.

== Career ==
She began to write for newspapers and magazines at the age of eighteen. She served as president of a soldier's aid society, which provided assistance to Union Army soldiers during the American Civil War.

She was president of the Anti-Tobacco Society (organized by her in 1881), Longport Agassiz Microscopial Society (organized by her in 1884), the Soldiers' Aid Society, the World's Woman's Christian Temperance Union, the National Woman's Christian Temperance Union, the Pennsylvania Woman's Press Association (1903–05), and superintendent of the School Savings Bank of Pennsylvania.

Beginning in 1889, Oberholtzer worked on the introduction of the school savings banks system into the public schools. The intent of the program was to introduce good savings habits in the children. Teachers would collect money from the students weekly and have it invested in local savings banks. Her bulletin on “School Savings Banks,” written for the United States Bureau of Education, and printed by the government in 1914, was widely distributed. Files of her Thrift Tidings, a quarterly she issued regularly for the public beginning in 1907, could be found in most public libraries. She was the acknowledged leader of the school savings banks movement, which was established in public schools in nearly every state in the United States and some schools in Canada.

She made an address on the subject in the first meeting of the Women's Council, in Washington, D.C. in February, 1891, which was printed in their "Transactions." Her address on school savings banks before the American Academy of Political and Social Science, in Philadelphia, in May, 1892, was printed in pamphlet form by the Academy. Her "How to Institute School Savings Banks," "A Plea for Economic Teaching " and other leaflet literature on the subject had broad circulation.

Her published books were Violet Lee and Other Poems (Philadelphia, 1873); Come for Arbutus and Other Wild Bloom (Philadelphia, 1882); Hope's Heart Bells (Philadelphia, 1883); Daisies of Verse (Philadelphia, 1886), and Souvenirs of Occasions (Philadelphia, 1892), consisting mainly of poems read by the author on public occasions. A number of poems were set to music by different composers. Among those best known are "The Bayard Taylor Burial Ode," sung as Pennsylvania's tribute to her dead poet at his funeral service in Longwood, March 15, 1889, and "Under the Flowers," a decoration ode. She wrote extensively for periodicals and magazines on economic subjects, biography, travel, ornithology and other topics, and did considerable local reporting. She was the author of numerous dialogues and charades. She was listed in catalogues of naturalists, and had one of the finest private collections of Australian bird skins and eggs in the U.S.

Oberholtzer was one of the speakers at the first meeting of the National Council of Women in Washington, D.C. (1890), at the World's Congress of Women in Chicago in 1893, at the Geneva, Switzerland meeting in 1903, and elsewhere. She aided in instituting the university extension movement.

She died February 2, 1930, and was interred at West Laurel Hill Cemetery in Bala Cynwyd, Pennsylvania.

== Personal life ==
On January 1, 1862, she married John Oberholtzer, of Norristown, Pennsylvania. They resided in Chester County, Pennsylvania, until 1883, after which time, their winter home was in Norristown, and their summer residence in Longport, New Jersey. Their children were Ellis Paxson Oberholtzer and Vickers.

== Selected works ==
- Violet Lee, and other Poems (Philadelphia, 1872)
- Come for Arbutus, and other Wild Bloom (1882)
- Hope's Heart Bells. A Romance. (1884)
- Daisies of Verse (1886)
- Souvenirs of Occasions (1892)
- Dialogues
- Letters of Travel
- Here and There - Songs of the Land and Sea That Came to Me (1927)

Her songs and hymns, set to music by different composers, were found in hymnals, and many of them in sheet form.
