= Dan Chisena =

American football player (born 1997)

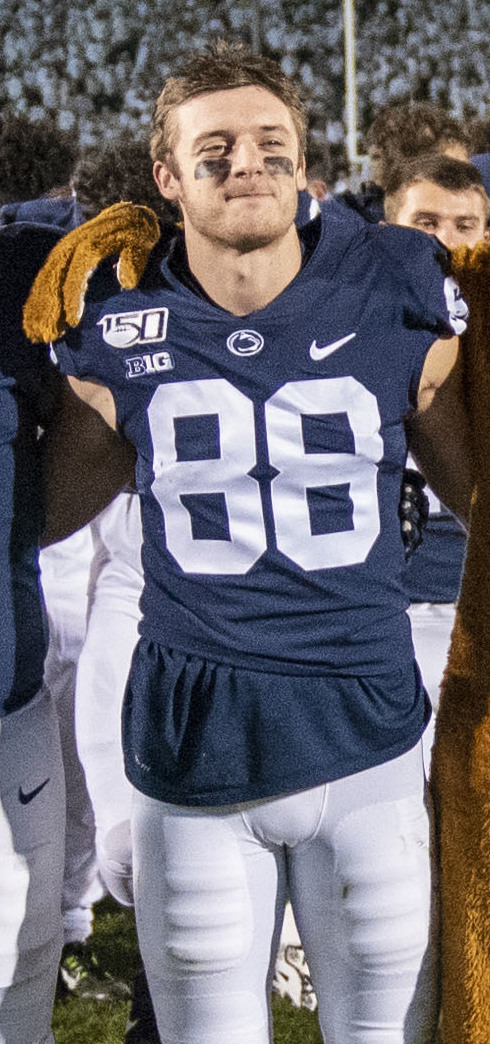
- Chisena with the Penn State Nittany Lions in 2019

Profile
- Position: Wide receiver

Personal information
- Born: February 25, 1997 (age 29); Paoli, Pennsylvania, U.S.
- Listed height: 6 ft 3 in (1.91 m)
- Listed weight: 202 lb (92 kg)

Career information
- High school: Downingtown East (Uwchlan, Pennsylvania)
- College: Penn State (2018–2019)
- NFL draft: 2020: undrafted

Career history
- Minnesota Vikings (2020–2022); Pittsburgh Steelers (2023)*; Minnesota Vikings (2023)*; Arizona Cardinals (2023); Baltimore Ravens (2023); Arizona Cardinals (2024)*; Carolina Panthers (2024–2025)
- * Offseason or practice squad member only

Career NFL statistics as of 2024
- Receptions: 3
- Receiving yards: 37
- Total tackles: 15
- Fumble recoveries: 1
- Stats at Pro Football Reference

Daniel David Chisena (born February 25, 1997) is an American professional football wide receiver. He played college football for the Penn State Nittany Lions.

== Early life ==
Chisena was born in Paoli, Pennsylvania and grew up in Downingtown, Pennsylvania. He attended Downingtown East High School, where he played football and was a sprinter on the track team. He was named first-team All-Ches-Mont League as a senior in football after catching 41 passes for 553 yards and three touchdowns. In track, Chisena won gold in the 100 meters, 200 meters and 4x100 relay at the 2015 PIAA Class AAA Outdoor State Championship.

== College career ==
Chisena joined both the football and track teams as a walk-on and redshirted as a freshman. He was offered a track scholarship at the end of his freshman year and left the football team due to NCAA rules. In track, Chisena came in third at the 2017 Big Ten Conference Outdoor Championships in the 400-meter and was part of the team that won the 4x400 relay at the 2017 Indoor Championships. After tearing his hamstring in early 2018, Chisena left the track team after two seasons in order to return to the football team.

Chisena played in two games in his first season with the football team as a junior. He was awarded a football scholarship for his final season during the team's spring game, in which he caught a 59-yard touchdown pass. As a senior, he played in all twelve of the Nittany Lions' games and caught three passes for 66 yards.

== Professional career ==
Pre-draft measurables
Height	Weight	Arm length	Hand span	Wingspan
6 ft 2 1/8 in (1.88 m)	195 lb (88 kg)	32 in (0.81 m)	9 in (0.23 m)	6 ft 3 1/2 in (1.92 m)
All values from Pro Day

=== Minnesota Vikings (first stint) ===
Chisena was signed by the Minnesota Vikings as an undrafted free agent on April 26, 2020. Chisena made the Vikings' 53-man active roster out of training camp, primarily for his special teams potential and his versatility, as he was converted to safety. Chisena made his NFL debut in the season opener on September 13, 2020, against the Green Bay Packers, playing on special teams. Chisena recovered a fumble on a muffed punt by DeAndre Carter on October 4, 2020, in a 31–23 win over the Houston Texans. Chisena played in 14 games as a rookie, playing exclusively on special teams and finishing the year with six tackles and a fumble recovery.

On September 1, 2021, Chisena was placed on injured reserve. He was activated, then waived on October 9, 2021. He was re-signed to the active roster on October 12.

On August 30, 2022, Chisena was waived by the Vikings. He was signed to the practice squad one day later.

=== Pittsburgh Steelers ===
On January 23, 2023, Chisena signed a reserve/future contract with the Pittsburgh Steelers. On August 26, 2023, Chisena was released.

=== Minnesota Vikings (second stint) ===
On October 11, 2023, the Vikings signed Chisena to their practice squad. He was waived on November 21.

=== Arizona Cardinals (first stint) ===
On November 22, 2023, Chisena was signed to the Arizona Cardinals practice squad. He was promoted to the active roster on December 2. He was released and re-signed to the practice squad on December 5. He was not signed to a reserve/future contract after the team's season ended, and thus became a free agent upon the expiration of his practice squad contract.

=== Baltimore Ravens ===
On January 10, 2024, Chisena was signed to the Baltimore Ravens practice squad. He was not signed to a reserve/future contract after the season and thus became a free agent when his practice squad contract expired.

=== Arizona Cardinals (second stint) ===
On February 6, 2024, Chisena signed a reserve/future contract with the Arizona Cardinals. He was waived on August 27, and re-signed to the practice squad. He was released on October 11.

=== Carolina Panthers ===
On October 16, 2024, Chisena signed with the Carolina Panthers' practice squad. He was promoted to the active roster on December 17. With Carolina, Chisena returned to playing wide receiver and finished the season with three catches for 38 yards.

On March 12, 2025, Chisena signed a one-year contract with the Panthers. On July 29, he was waived by Carolina with an injury settlement. Chisena was re-signed to the practice squad on September 23.

Chisena signed a reserve/future contract with Carolina on January 12, 2026. He was placed on injured reserve on July 29. Chisena was released by the Panthers on August 29.
