= White Dog Cafe =

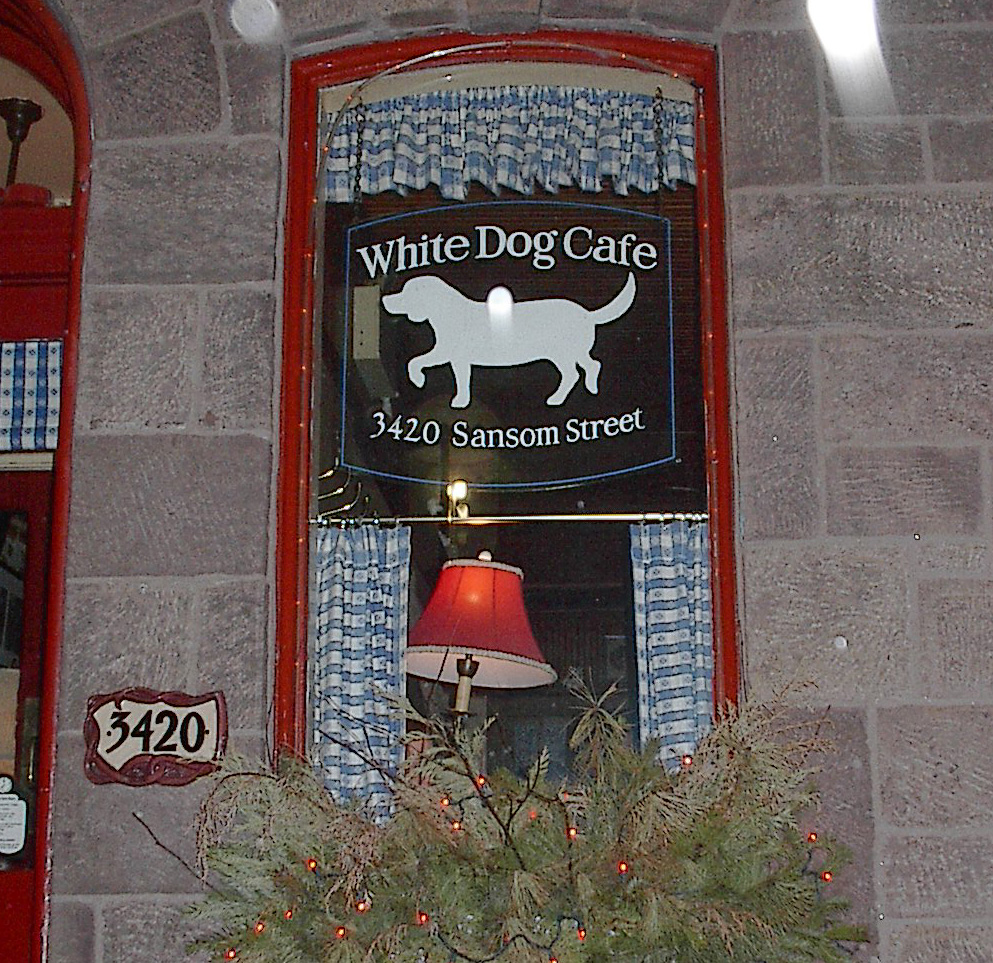
- The White Dog Cafe in Philadelphia

Restaurant information
- Established: 1983
- Owner: Marty Grims
- Previous owner: Judy Wicks
- Chef: Zach Grainda
- Food type: Local American
- Location: Philadelphia, Pennsylvania, United States
- Other locations: Wayne, Pennsylvania; Haverford, Pennsylvania; Glen Mills, Pennsylvania
- Website: www.whitedog.com

The White Dog Cafe is the name of five restaurants located in the Philadelphia, Pennsylvania area. The restaurants employ dog-themed decor. The first restaurant was founded in University City, Philadelphia by Judy Wicks in 1983. Noted for its commitment to local food and environmental stewardship, it became a Philadelphia institution. In 1993 Conde Nast Traveler magazine recognized the White Dog Cafe as one of "50 American restaurants worth the journey".

Wicks sold the restaurant in 2009 in order to be able to spend more time running the Business Alliance for Local Living Economies, which she co-founded eight years earlier. She sold the White Dog Cafe to restaurateur Marty Grims, who opened its second location, in Wayne, Pennsylvania, in 2010, and then a third location in Haverford, Pennsylvania in May 2015. A fourth location in Glen Mills, Pennsylvania opened in September, 2020. A fifth location opened June 2024 in Exton, after an extensive renovation of the Vickers Tavern, once the home of abolitionist John Vickers.

== Fare ==
A significant amount of the fare purveyed is sourced from local farms that adhere to environmentally friendly practices in a humane manner. For example, the restaurant sources and uses organic produce when possible and has used free-range chicken. 10–20% of the company's profits go to fund charities.

== Social advocacy and responsibility ==
Under Wicks, White Dog Cafe advocated for social change and has hosted community meetings and lectures covering topics such as foreign policy and health care reform. It has hosted various activist speakers from venues that range from the local community to the magazine The Nation to the American Civil Liberties Union. The restaurant also hosts community tours to educate about the environment, the arts, affordable housing and matters regarding children. It has also hosted annual eco-tours, where people have traveled by bus to visit places such as a water-treatment plant and a family-run farm.

In 2001, Wicks founded a nonprofit organization called the White Dog Cafe Foundation (now White Dog Community Enterprises), which focuses on promoting sustainable and humane farms and the provision of local foods in the Philadelphia area.

In 2002, the restaurant sourced 100% of its electricity from wind power sources, becoming the first business in Pennsylvania to do so.

Business Ethics magazine bestowed on the White Dog Cafe the Living Economy Award at its 2002 Business Ethics Awards, "For being an exemplar of the living economy: locally rooted, human scale, stakeholder-owned, and life-serving."

== Works ==
- Wicks, Judy; von Klause, Kevin; Fitzgerald, Elizabeth. White Dog Cafe Cookbook: Multicultural Recipes and Tales of Adventure from Philadelphia's Revolutionary Restaurant. Running Press, 1998.
