= Ellis Paxson Oberholtzer =

American historian and film censor (1868-1936)

- Born: October 5, 1868
- Died: December 8, 1936 (aged 68)
- Burial place: West Laurel Hill Cemetery, Bala Cynwyd, Pennsylvania, U.S.

Ellis Paxson Oberholtzer (October 5, 1868 - December 8, 1936) was an American historian, newspaper editor, and film censor. He worked as editor for the Public Ledger, the Philadelphia Manufacturer, and The Philadelphia Times. He was editor of the 20 volume American Crisis Biography Series, which focused mainly on the American Civil War, and wrote two of the series on Abraham Lincoln and Jay Cooke.

He served as the head of the Pennsylvania State Board of Censors from 1925 to 1935. He was among the most restrictive film censors and worked to reduce depictions of sex in films.

== Early life and education ==
He was born October 5, 1868, to Sara Louisa Oberholtzer and John Oberholtzer. His father ran the The Mill at Anselma in Chester Springs, Pennsylvania, and was a successful merchant. Ellis' mother was a novelist and poet.

He studied economics and political science at the University of Pennsylvania and graduated in 1889. He conducted his graduate work with John Bach McMaster and graduated with a Doctor of Philosophy in history from the University of Pennsylvania in 1893. He traveled to Europe and studied at several universities including in Berlin, Heidelberg, and Paris.

== Career ==
In 1889, he worked as an associate editor for the Philadelphia Evening Telegraph while he completed his doctorate studies. In 1895, after returning from his studies in Europe, he worked as an editor at the Philadelphia Manufacturer, the Public Ledger, and The Philadelphia Times. He was editor of the 20 volume American Crisis Biography Series which focused mainly on the American Civil War. He wrote two of the series on Abraham Lincoln and Jay Cooke.

He worked as the secretary of the Pennsylvania State Board of Censors from 1915 to 1921. He worked to reduce the depiction of sex in the movies and his stance on the issue drove Pennsylvania Governor William Cameron Sproul to remove Oberholtzer from the board at the request of powerful interest groups. He served as the head of the Pennsylvania State Board of Censors from 1925 to 1935. He was among the most restrictive movie censors, writing that movies of the early 1920s were "an abysmal morass of fornication, adultery, pandering, and prostitution." He wrote a book, The Morals of the Movie, on this topic.

From 1925 to 1935, he served on the Valley Forge Historical Commission. He was the corresponding secretary for the Historical Society of Pennsylvania and a member of the Franklin Inn Club and the English-Speaking Union.

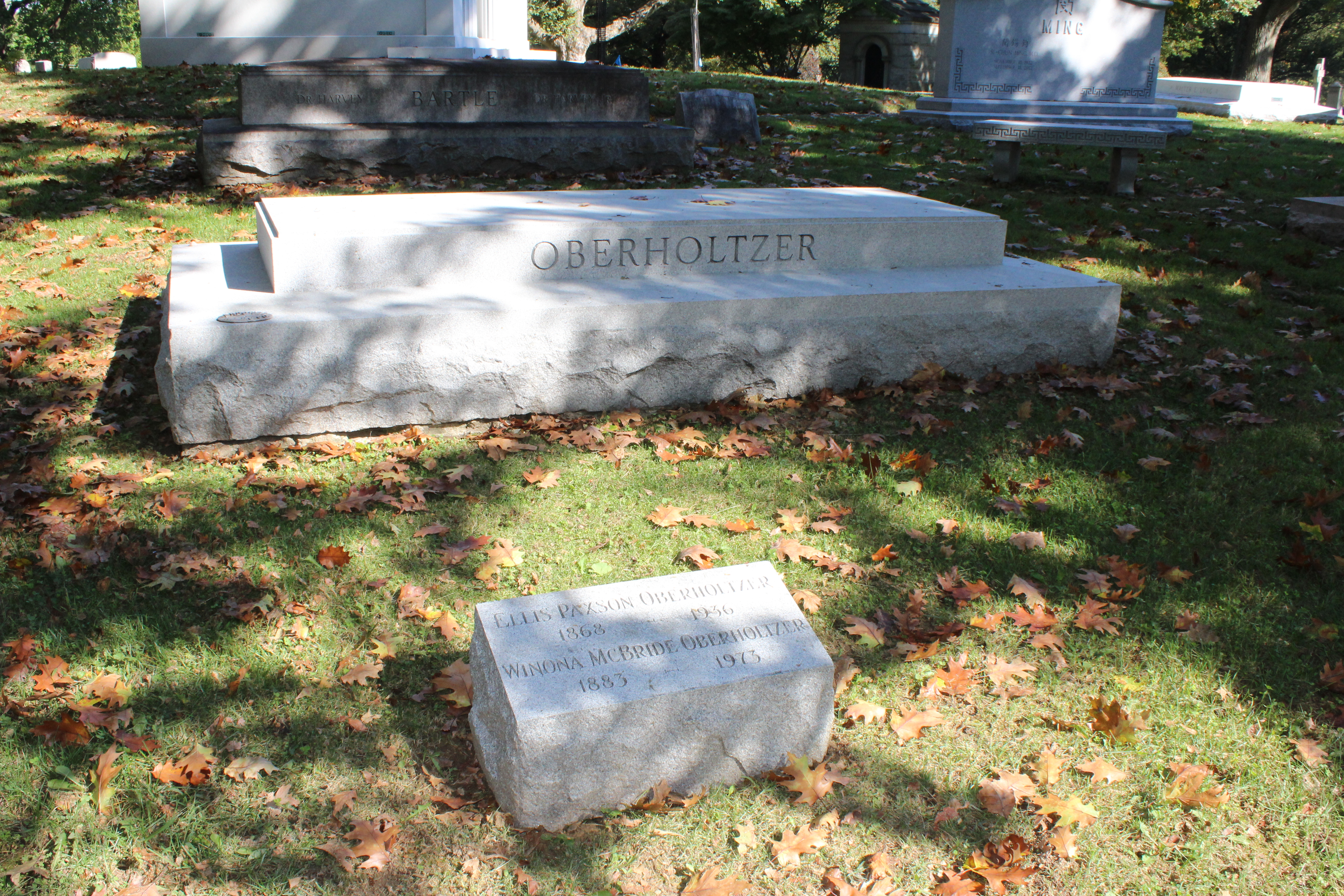
Ellis Paxson Oberholtzer tombstone in West Laurel Hill Cemetery

He died December 8, 1936, and was interred at West Laurel Hill Cemetery in Bala Cynwyd, Pennsylvania.

== Personal life ==
He married Winona McBride on November 19, 1926. They had no children.

== Works ==
- The Referendum in America (1893; new edition, 1900; 3rd ed., 1908; revised, 1911)
- Die Beziehungen zwischen dem Staat und der Zeitungspresse im deutschen Reich (1895)
- The New Man (1897)
- Robert Morris, Patriot and Financier (1903)
- Abraham Lincoln (1904)
- The Literary History of Philadelphia (1906)
- Jay Cooke: Financier of the Civil War. Vol. 1. Philadelphia: George W. Jacobs & Company. 1907.
- Jay Cooke: Financier of the Civil War. Vol. 2. Philadelphia: George W. Jacobs & Company. 1907.
- Henry Clay (1909), with T. H. Clay
- Philadelphia: A History of the City and its People (four volumes, 1912).
- A History of the United States since the Civil War (1917).
- The Morals of the Movie (1922).
