= Downingtown Area School District =

School district in Pennsylvania

Location
- 540 Trestle Place, Downingtown, Pennsylvania, U.S. North America Downingtown, Chester County, Pennsylvania, 19335; United States

District information
- Type: Public
- Motto: Downingtown Delivers
- Grades: K-12
- President: Board President: LeeAnn Wisdom (Term Expires 2025)
- Vice-president: Board VP: Audrey Blust
- Superintendent of Schools: Dr. Robert O’Donnell Ed.d
- Asst. superintendent(s): Robert Reed, 7-12 Instruction and Curriculum
- School board: Margaret Miller Madhu Gurthy Mindy Ross Lisa Strobridge Jane Bertone Joyce Houghton Caryn Mcleary-Ghrayeb
- Schools: 17 (including Cyber Academy K-12)
- Budget: $201,335,000

Students and staff
- Students: 13,250
- Staff: 1,895
- Colors: Blue and Gold

Other information
- Website: www.dasd.org

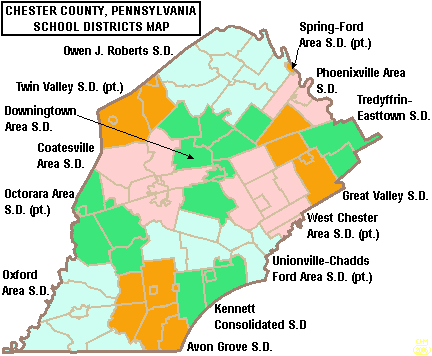
Map of Chester County, Pennsylvania public school districts with Downingtown Area School District highlighted in green in the central part of the county

The Downingtown Area School District is a school district based in Downingtown, in Chester County, Pennsylvania, in the United States. The district operates ten elementary schools, three middle schools and three high schools. As of 2018, the district educates approximately 12,000 students, making it the largest school district in Chester County.

== Geography ==
The district, located in central Chester County serves all of the following municipalities:

- Downingtown
- East Brandywine Township
- East Caln Township
- Upper Uwchlan Township
- Uwchlan Township
- Wallace Township
- West Bradford Township
- West Pikeland Township

== Rankings ==
As of 2017, U.S. News & World Report has named all three DASD high schools, DHS East, DHS West, and the Downingtown STEM Academy as three of the top high schools in the United States. DHS East and DHS West earned a silver award. Downingtown STEM Academy received a bronze award.

DHS East, DHS West and the Downingtown STEM Academy have been named to The Washington Post's list of the most challenging high schools in America.

The International Baccalaureate Organization has named the Downingtown STEM Academy an International Baccalaureate (IB) World School. The STEM Academy is the first IB World School in Chester County and will be the first high school in the nation to offer an IB program with STEM pathways.

== Schools ==
=== Elementary schools ===
- Beaver Creek Elementary - Downingtown
- Bradford Heights Elementary School - West Bradford Twp.
- Brandywine Wallace Elementary School - East Brandywine Twp.
- East Ward Elementary School - Downingtown
- Lionville Elementary School - Uwchlan Twp.
- Pickering Valley Elementary School - Upper Uwchlan Twp.
- Shamona Creek Elementary School - Uwchlan Twp.
- Springton Manor Elementary School - Wallace Twp.
- Uwchlan Hills Elementary School - Uwchlan Twp.
- West Bradford Elementary School - West Bradford Twp.

=== Middle schools ===
- Downingtown Middle School - Caln Township - The school is physically in Caln Township but the township is not in the school district service area
- Lionville Middle School - Uwchlan Twp.
- Marsh Creek Sixth Grade Center - Uwchlan Twp.

=== High schools ===
- Downingtown High School - Downingtown High School is split into two campuses: Downingtown East (Uwchlan Twp.) and Downingtown West (Downingtown). While still legally considered to be one school, East and West are generally regarded as being separate entities.
- Downingtown STEM Academy (Science, Technology, Engineering, and Math) - A magnet high school opened Fall 2011.
- Downingtown Cyber Academy - An online educational school for high school students that opened in August 2012.

== Notable alummni ==
- Dave Days, musician from YouTube
- Sara Shepard, author of Pretty Little Liars
- Pat Devlin, NFL Quarterback
- Kyle Lauletta, NFL Quarterback
- Tyler Kroft, NFL Tight End
- Brian Sims, PA State Representative
- Arlen Harris, NFL Running Back
- Adriana Chechik, Pornographic film actor
- Will Howard, NFL Quarterback
