= Greg Wilson (soccer) =

American soccer player and coach

Personal information
- Full name: Gregory J. Wilson
- Date of birth: 1971 or 1972 (age 54–55)
- Position: Forward

Team information
- Current team: UC Santa Barbara Gauchos

Youth career
- Downingtown High School

College career
Years	Team	Apps	(Gls)
1990–1993	Philadelphia College of Textiles & Science		

Senior career*
Years	Team	Apps	(Gls)
1994–1996	Pennsylvania Freedom		

Managerial career
- 2003–2005: Philadelphia University
- 2006–2014: UC Santa Barbara Gauchos (asst.)
- 2015–: UC Santa Barbara Gauchos (assoc.)
- * Club domestic league appearances and goals

Gregory J. Wilson (born c. 1971/72) is an American soccer head coach and former professional player. He is currently the associate head coach with the UC Santa Barbara Gauchos men's soccer team.

== Early life and education ==
Wilson was a native of Downingtown, Pennsylvania and attended Downingtown High School. He was a member of the state championship soccer team in 1989 and was named as a National Soccer Coaches Association of America All-American player before the conclusion of his high school career.

Wilson attended college at Philadelphia College of Textiles & Science and was a student-athlete on the men's soccer team from 1990 to 1993. He graduated with a Bachelor of Science in marketing in 1994.

== Playing career ==
Wilson played professionally with the Pennsylvania Freedom in the USISL for three years. At 22, he was one of the youngest players on the Freedom for the 1994 United States Interregional Soccer League season.

== Coaching career ==
=== Early career ===
After playing professionally, Wilson coached several youth teams based in the Pennsylvania area including FC Delco and Downingtown High School, the latter with whom he won back-to-back Pennsylvania Interscholastic Athletic Association in 1998 and 1999. He was named the 1998 The Philadelphia Inquirer Coach of the Year. He also served on staff for the Penn Quakers in 2002.

Wilson was named head coach of his alma mater, since renamed as Philadelphia University, before the 2003 season. His first game with the Rams was September 2, 2003.

=== University of California, Santa Barbara (2006-present) ===
After three seasons with the Rams, it was announced in March 2006 that Wilson would join the UC Santa Barbara Gauchos men's soccer team as an assistant coach. Before the 2015 season, Wilson was elevated to an associate head coach position with the Gauchos.

== Personal life ==
Greg Wilson resides in Santa Barbara, California with his wife, Andra, and their son, Baylor.
