= Downingtown STEM Academy =

Coordinates: 40.00888°N 75.71406°W

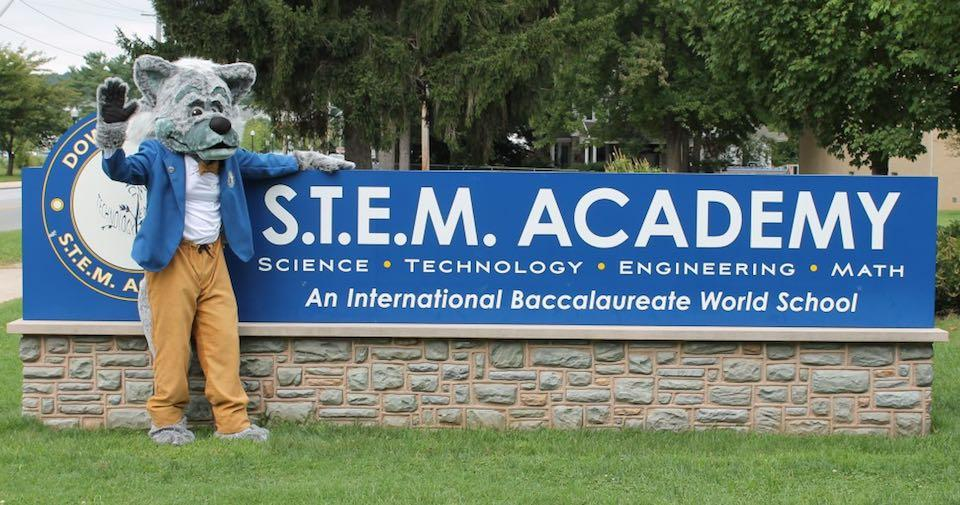

Location
- 335 Manor Avenue; Downingtown, Pennsylvania; United States

Information
- Type: IB World School, secondary school, magnet school
- Established: 2011
- School district: Downingtown Area School District
- Headmaster: Art Campbell
- Teaching staff: 68.06 (FTE)
- Grades: 9-12
- Enrollment: 962 (2023–2024)
- Student to teacher ratio: 14.13
- Colors: Blue and Gold
- National ranking: 22nd Best Public High School in the U.S. by U.S. News & World Report in 2025
- Website: https://st.dasd.org/

Downingtown STEM Academy is a public high school and an International Baccalaureate (IB) World School in the Downingtown Area School District, located in Downingtown, Pennsylvania. The school has a unique curriculum that prepares students for college education and careers in the STEM fields. A major focus in the courses offered at the Downingtown STEM Academy is inquiry and project-based learning, as well as the growth of 21st-century learning skills.

The school's enrollment is approximately 1000 students; admission into the school is required to attend.

== History ==
The former Downingtown Educational Center/Ninth Grade Center was renovated to become the Downingtown STEM Academy in Fall of 2011. The school became an IB World School in January 2012.

As of December 11, 2013, the Downingtown STEM Academy was ranked as the top public high school in Pennsylvania, achieving a School Performance Profile score of 101.4, and in 2017 received a 104.0.

In 2018, U.S. News & World Report ranked the Downingtown STEM Academy as the number one public high school in the state of Pennsylvania, and number thirty-four in the United States. In 2026 Downingtown STEM Academy was ranked #19 in the United States according to U.S. News & World Report .

== International Baccalaureate Curriculum ==
In the ninth and tenth grades, students take "pre-diploma" classes that prepare them for classes in the IB program. In the eleventh and twelfth grades, students take six IB classes and have the opportunity to participate in the IB Diploma Programme to achieve an IB diploma, in addition to their diploma from the Downingtown Area School District.
