= Bodo Otto House =

Historic house in New Jersey, United States

- U.S. National Register of Historic Places
- New Jersey Register of Historic Places
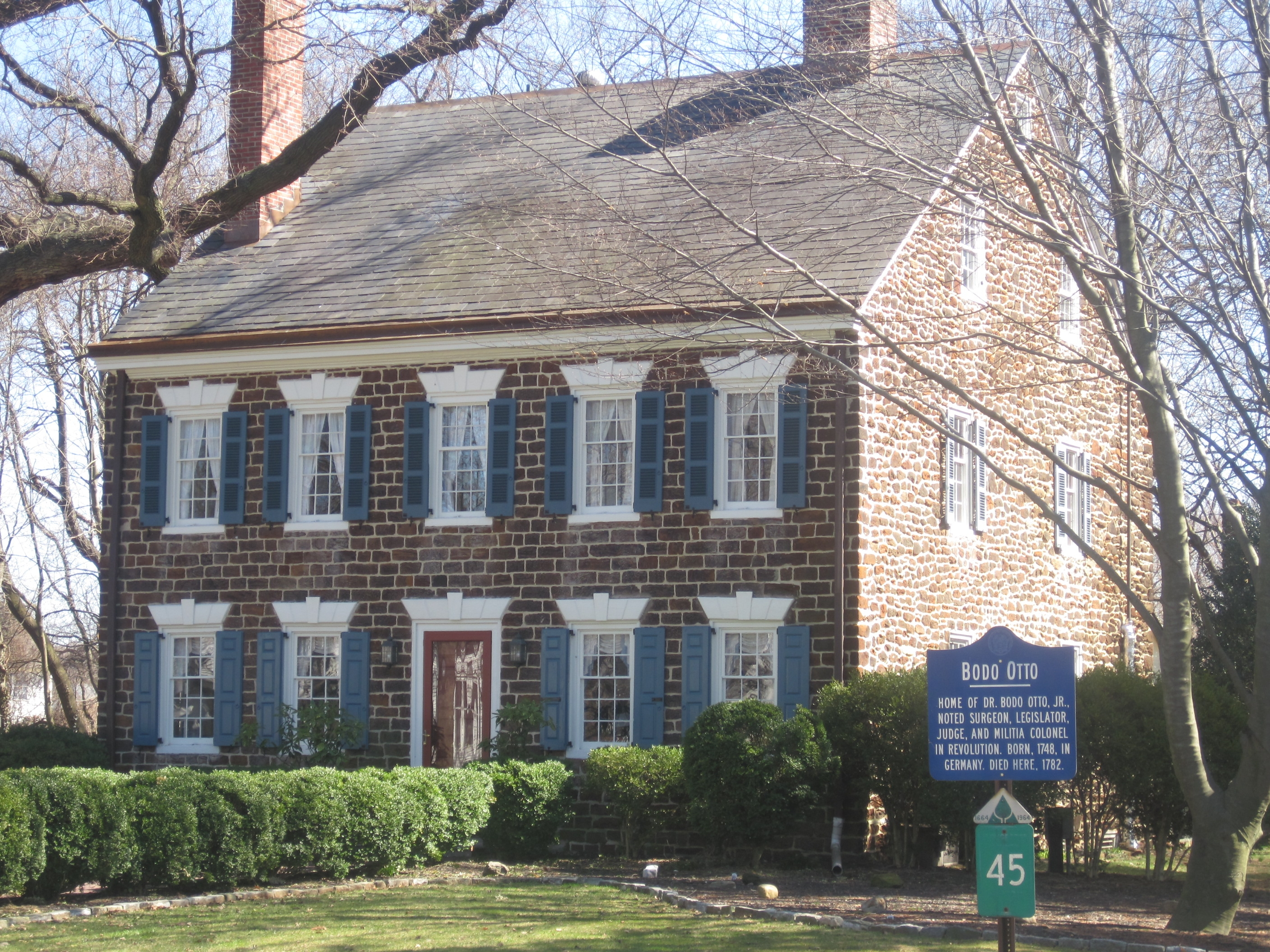

- Location within Gloucester County, New Jersey Location within New Jersey Location within the United States
- Location: on Kings Highway, Mickleton, New Jersey
- Built: 1766
- Architectural style: Georgian
- NRHP reference No.: 76001154
- NJRHP No.: 1376

Significant dates
- Added to NRHP: December 12, 1976
- Designated NJRHP: August 10, 1973

The Bodo Otto House, also known as the Joseph Young House, is a historic house located at the corner of County Route 551 (Kings Highway) and Quaker Road in the Mickleton section of East Greenwich Township in Gloucester County, New Jersey, United States. The house was built in 1725 and documented by the Historic American Buildings Survey (HABS) in 1936. It was added to the National Register of Historic Places on December 12, 1976, for its significance in military history.

== History and description ==
The house is a three story stone building featuring Georgian architecture. The house once had nine bedrooms with eight fireplaces. The land was first deeded in 1688 as the Neat Farmer’s Plantation. Joseph Young had the home built in 1725 which was described as a two story stone home with a loft. Bodo Otto Jr. (1748–1782) purchased the home in a sheriff sale, son of Bodo Otto, on August 1, 1772. The house was burned in 1778, during the American Revolutionary War. His wife, Catherine Schweighausen, sold the property to Samuel Tonkin in 1796, who added a significant addition which is how the house stands today.

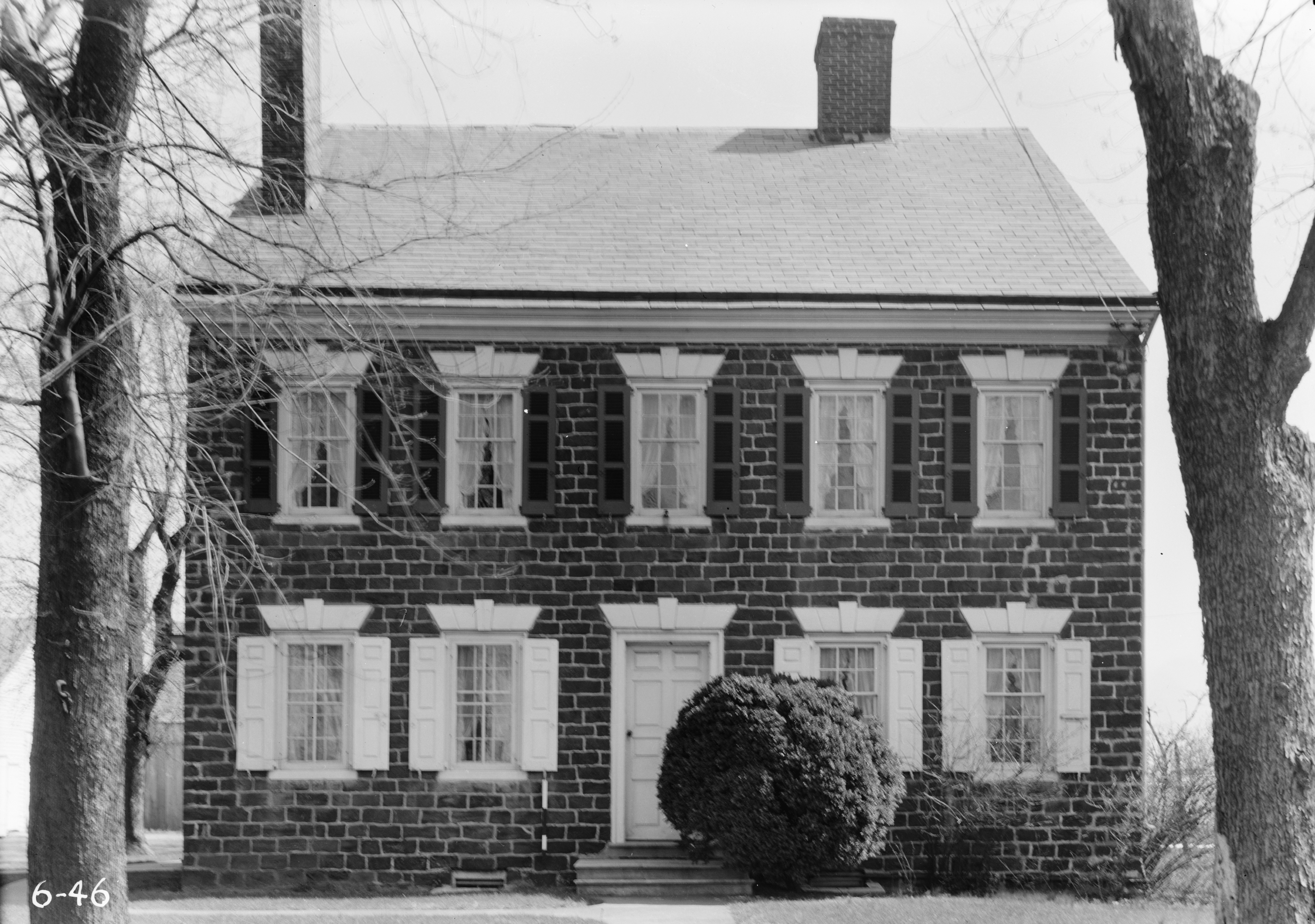
HABS photo from 1936

== See also ==
- National Register of Historic Places listings in Gloucester County, New Jersey
