= Brian Kelley (disambiguation) =

Brian Kelley (born 1985) is an American singer and member of the country music duo Florida Georgia Line.

Brian Kelley may also refer to:

- Brian Kelley (CIA officer) (1943–2011), American CIA agent
- Brian Kelley (American football) (born 1951), American football linebacker
- Brian Kelley (writer), American television writer

== See also ==
- Brian Kelly (disambiguation)
