= Downingtown High School =

Secondary school in Pennsylvania, US

Information
- Type: Public secondary school
- Established: 1874; 2003 (split)
- School district: Downingtown Area School District
- Principal: East: Dr. Matthew Barr; West: Dr. A. Kurt Baker
- Grades: 9-12
- Enrollment: East: 1,721; West: 1,460
- Campus: East: Uwchlan Township, PA; 40°2′29.4″N 75°39′40.0″W; West: Downingtown, PA; 40°0′42.2″N 75°43′8.3″W
- Colors: Blue and gold
- Athletics: PIAA District 1
- Mascot: East: The Cougar; West:The Whippets
- Nickname: East: Cougars; West: Whippets
- Website: East; West

Downingtown High School is an American secondary school located in Downingtown, Pennsylvania and Uwchlan Township, Pennsylvania. Population growth in the burgeoning Downingtown Area School District forced the original Downingtown Senior High School to split into two campuses: Downingtown High School East Campus and Downingtown High School West Campus. While still legally considered one school, the two campuses (usually referred to simply as "East" or "West") are generally regarded as separate entities.

The West Campus is located on the original high school's campus within Downingtown Borough. A portion of the campus is in Caln Township.

The East Campus is actually located in Uwchlan Township. It has an Exton postal address and is adjacent to, but not within, the Lionville census-designated place.

The mascot for Downingtown West is the whippet, the traditional Downingtown mascot; Downingtown East's is the cougar. Both schools' colors are blue and gold, a similarity that recalls that the two campuses were once one school. A healthy rivalry exists between Downingtown East and West. Both schools are known for athletics and have won titles in different sports.

== Athletics ==
Downingtown East and West campuses field the following sports:

- Fall
  - Cross country
  - Field hockey
  - Football
  - Golf
  - Soccer
  - Tennis
  - Volleyball
  - Marching Band
- Winter
  - Basketball
  - Ice Hockey
  - Indoor track & field
  - Swimming & diving
  - Wrestling
- Spring
  - Baseball
  - Softball
  - Lacrosse
  - Tennis
  - Track & field

== Extracurriculars ==
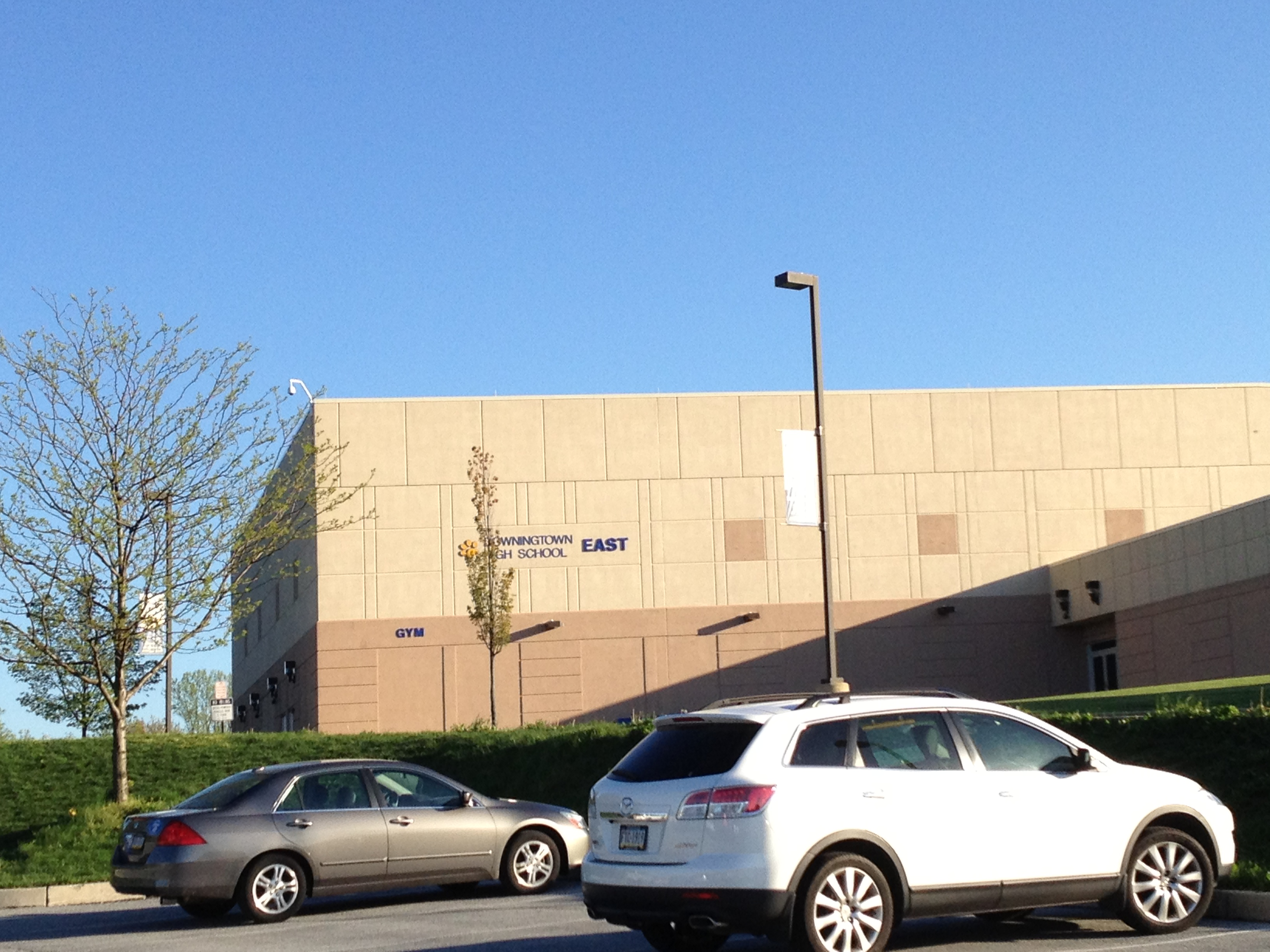
Downingtown High School East

Downingtown High School has many clubs, from marching band to the ski club. The Student Council forms many committees and community service programs throughout the year. Both schools also have FBLA-PBL clubs (Future Business Leaders of America) which had nine students qualify for the national competition in 2003, seven students qualify for the national competition in 2014, and five qualify in 2015. The combined school's marching band has participated in the Tournament of Roses Parade, the Citrus Bowl Parade and the Indy 500 Parade. In 2011, the band performed in the Tournament of Roses Parade for the second time; in 2022, for the third time. In 2024, the Downingtown East Campus band represented the state of Pennsylvania in the 2024 Pearl Harbor Memorial Day Parade in Hawaii.

Extracurricular activities include:

- Student Council
- National Honor Society
- Theatre Association
- Music Ensembles (band, orchestra, choir)
- Afro Appreciation Club
- Ecology Club (the oldest in the nation)
- Ski Club
- Academic Team
- Schools for Schools
- Robotics Club
- German Club
- French Club
- Spanish Club
- Japanese Club
- Photography Club
- Film Club
- TV Studio
- Key Club
- Science Olympiad
- Gay-Straight Alliance
- Movie Critics Club
- Bowling Club
- Art Club
- Gamer Club

== Notable alumni ==
=== Artists ===
- Dave Days (East), musician and internet personality
- Sara Shepard, author of Pretty Little Liars

=== Athletes ===
- Cary Angeline (East), football
- Dan Chisena (East), football
- Pat Devlin (East), football
- Becky Edwards (West), soccer
- Arlen Harris, football
- Will Howard (West), football
- Brian Kelly, lacrosse
- Tyler Kroft (East), football
- Kyle Lauletta (East), football
- Tina Nicholson, basketball
- Daniel Ochefu (East), basketball
- Jeff Parke, soccer
- Drew Shelton (West), football
- Paul Siever, football
- Zack Steffen (West), soccer
- Tora Suber, basketball
- Jeremy Vuolo (West), soccer
- Elijah Wilkinson (West), football
- Greg Wilson, soccer

=== Politicians ===
- Scott Petri, Pennsylvania state representative
- Curt Schroder, Pennsylvania state representative
- Brian Sims, Pennsylvania state representative
