= Bodo Otto =

American physician

Doctor Bodo Otto
- Born: 1709; Germany
- Died: June 13, 1787 (aged 77–78); Reading, Pennsylvania, US
- Burial place: Trinity Lutheran Church Cemetery; 40.32710, -75.91470
- Occupations: Surgeon, Physician
- Known for: Surgeon for the Continental Army
- Spouse: Anna Elizabeth Sauchen (married 1737–1738) Catharine Doratha Doehmicher (married 1742–1765) Margaret Parris (married 1768–1801)
- Children: 5

Bodo Otto (1711—1787) was a Senior Surgeon of the Continental Army during the American Revolution.

== Early life, family, and education ==
Bodo Otto was born in Germany in 1709.

He was trained as a surgeon at the University of Göttingen in Germany. He was a member of the College of Surgeons at Lueneberg and was in charge of all prisoners that were held at Fortress Kalenberg in Germany.

Dr. Otto was married three times:

- Anna Elizabeth Sauchen
  - Married in 1737 in Germany
  - She died in 1738 in Germany
  - They had one child
    - Mary Elizabeth
- Catharine Doratha Doehmicher
  - Married on May 21st in 1742
  - She died in 1765 in Philadelphia, Pennsylvania
  - They had four children
    - Frederick Christopher (08/22/1743 to 11/18/1795)
    - Doratha Sophia (02/28/1745 to 11/16/1774)
    - Bodo Jr. (09/11/1748 to 01/20/1782)
    - John Augustus (07/20/1751 to 12/16/1834)
- Margaret Parris
  - Married on December 18th in 1768
  - Died in 1801
    - They had no children

He resided in the Electorate of Hanover in what is now Germany and emigrated in 1755.

Otto was one of the early settlers of Philadelphia, Pennsylvania.

He was one of the first trained and skilled surgeons and physicians in Reading, Pennsylvania.

== Public service ==
Dr. Otto publicly opposed the Stamp Act and also served on the Berks County Committee of Public Safety.

He was one of the delegates in 1776 to represent Berks County in the Provincial Conference.

He gave his services as a trained surgeon during the Revolutionary War in the Continental Army for the United States.

== Medical treatment for military ==
During the Revolution the Second Continental Congress appointed Dr. Otto to establish a military hospital in Trenton, New Jersey for the treatment of smallpox. He was present during the Battle of Long Island in 1776. He was also assigned to the Continental hospital at Valley Forge and located in the Uwchlan Meetinghouse. Later during the Revolution, Dr. Otto was put in charge of the hospitals in Yellow Springs (in what is now Chester Springs, Pennsylvania), where he and one of his sons treated the ill soldiers from Valley Forge. Dr. Otto and one of his sons crossed the Delaware River with General Washington and his army and surprised Hessian soldiers encamped at Trenton on the morning of 26 December 1776. He was widely respected for selflessly treating wounded and dying Hessians. There were only a smattering of casualties on the American side.

Bodo used Trinity Lutheran Church in Reading, Pennsylvania, as a hospital to treat wounded soldiers from the Battle of Brandywine.

Dr. Otto did not retire from his Army service until February 1782 at age 70.

== Personal life and demise ==
His three sons were also physicians for the Army, and they assisted him as Junior Surgeon and Surgeon Mates.

Dr. Otto died in 1787 and was buried in Reading, Pennsylvania, at the Trinity Lutheran Church (where he was a member) Cemetery. Many of his surgical instruments as well as a portrait of him and his wife are in the collection of the Historical Society of Berks County in Reading.

A great-grandson, Judge William Tod Otto who moved from Philadelphia to settle in Indiana, served in US President Abraham Lincoln's administration as Assistant Secretary of the Interior. According to The New York Times, Judge Otto was one of twelve men permitted at Lincoln's bedside when he died.

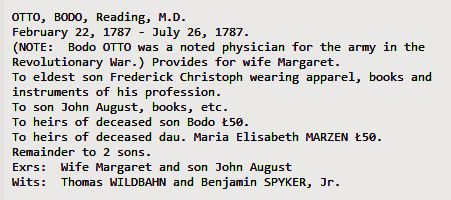
Dr. Bodo Otto Information

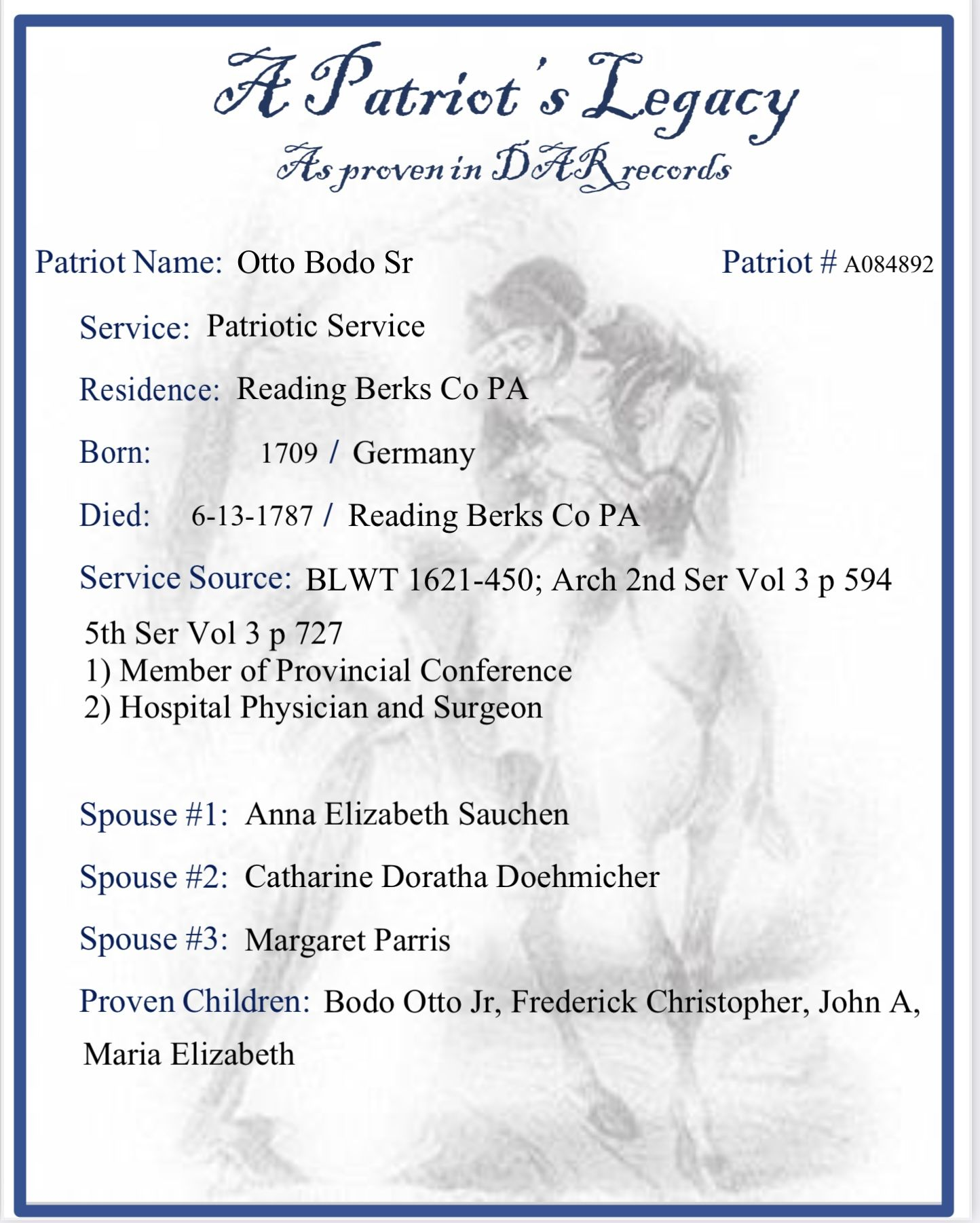
Dr. Bodo Otto's DAR Records Information

== See also ==
- Bodo Otto House
