= Arlen Harris =

American football player (born 1980)

No. 33
- Position: Running back

Personal information
- Born: April 22, 1980 (age 46); Chester, Pennsylvania
- Listed height: 5 ft 10 in (1.78 m)
- Listed weight: 212 lb (96 kg)

Career information
- High school: Downingtown
- College: University of Virginia
- NFL draft: 2003: undrafted

Career history
- St. Louis Rams (2003–2005); Detroit Lions (2006); Atlanta Falcons (2007)
- Stats at Pro Football Reference

Arlen Quincy Harris Sr. (born April 22, 1980) is a former NFL running back who played for the St. Louis Rams, Detroit Lions, and the Atlanta Falcons. He played college football for the University of Virginia and Hofstra University. He won a PIAA State Championship at Downingtown High School as a player in 1997. He won a MSHSAA State Championship at Lutheran St. Charles in 2021 as the head varsity coach, named Coach of the Year along with his oldest son AJ receiving Offensive POY and his youngest son Ayden Defensive POY.

== Biography ==
Arlen was born in Chester, Pennsylvania, and was considered one of the top 3 running backs coming out of Downingtown High School where he won a PIAA State Championship and broke Tony Dorsett's rushing record. He was a Parade All-American. He also played in the Big 33 All-Star game vs the top players in Ohio and won MVP. In college, Harris did not play his junior year, due to an injury to his knee, or his senior year because he transferred and lost that year's eligibility. So, Harris did not play football for two years until he made his return to football in the Paradise Bowl all-star game in Las Vegas and was named MVP.

Harris was undrafted in the 2003 NFL draft, and signed with the NFL's St. Louis Rams. He played three seasons with the Rams, starting three games and scoring three touchdowns versus the Steelers' #1 defense. He moved to the Detroit Lions in 2006, also starting three games there. He ended his career with the Atlanta Falcons with a knee injury in the last pre-season game against the Baltimore Ravens.

Harris and his wife, Heather, have three children, Caeli, Arlen Jr., and Ayden.

In 2017, Harris was inducted into the Chester County Sports Hall of Fame.

In 2018, Harris was inducted into the Downingtown High School Hall of Fame.
