= Brian Kelly (footballer, born 1943) =

English footballer (1943–2018)

Personal information
- Full name: Brian Leslie Kelly
- Date of birth: 22 May 1943
- Place of birth: Ilkley, England
- Date of death: 2 August 2018 (aged 75)
- Place of death: Bradford, England
- Position: Full back

Youth career
- Bradford City

Senior career*
| Years | Team | Apps | (Gls) |
| 1961–1965 | Bradford City | 83 | (2) |
| 1965–1968 | Doncaster Rovers | 131 | (3) |
| 1968–1970 | York City | 33 | (0) |
- Halifax Town
- Bartle Rovers
| Total | | 247 | (5) |
- * Club domestic league appearances and goals

Brian Leslie Kelly (22 May 1943 – 2 August 2018) was an English professional footballer who played as a full back in the Football League for Bradford City, Doncaster Rovers and York City. He later played for Halifax Town and Bartle Rovers.

He was born in Ilkley in 1943. He died on 2 August 2018, aged 75.
