= Uwchlan Meetinghouse =

Historic Quaker 1756 meeting house in Lionville, Pennsylvania, United States

- U.S. National Register of Historic Places
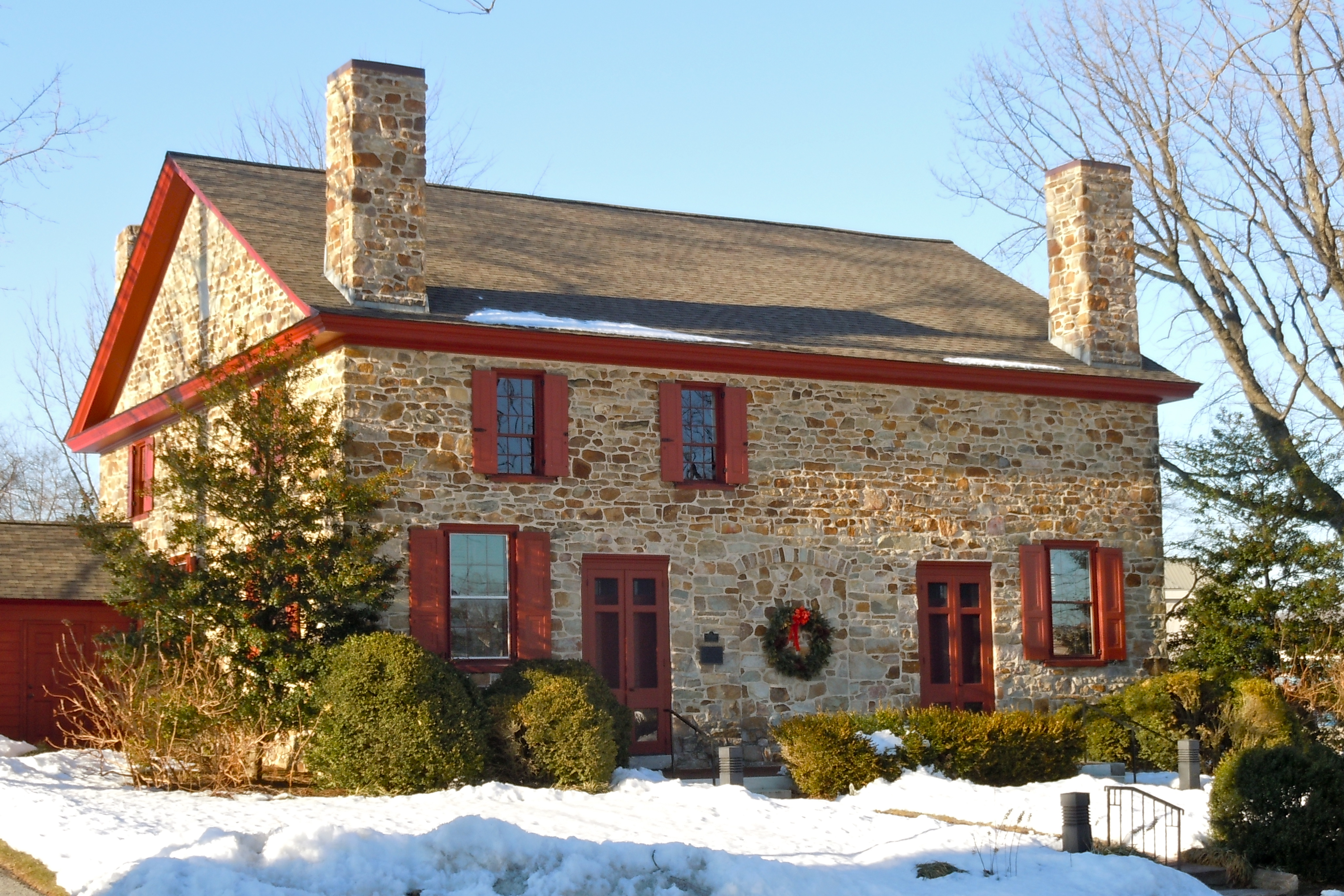
- Uwchlan Meetinghouse, February 2011

- Location within Pennsylvania Location within the United States
- Location: N. Village Ave. (Rte. 113), Lionville, Pennsylvania
- Coordinates: 40°3′16″N 75°39′37″W
- Area: less than one acre
- Built: 1756
- NRHP reference No.: 73001606
- Added to NRHP: September 20, 1973

Uwchlan Meetinghouse is a historic Quaker meeting house located on North Village Avenue (Pennsylvania Route 113) at Lionville in Uwchlan Township, Chester County, Pennsylvania. It was built in 1756, and is a 2 1/2-story, rubble fieldstone structure with a gable roof. Monthly as well as weekly meetings for business matters were first held there. So, too, were weddings and burials.

== Meeting house, library and school ==
The origin of the building began in 1715 when Joseph Cadwalader, a Welshman, bought a large tract of land from David Lloyd and donated a small piece to the Society of Friends for their meeting house and burial ground. The Welsh Friends who had been meeting in different homes built a log cabin, which some historians think burned down, and subsequently built a second log cabin with glass windows. As more people moved into the area and prospered, they replaced the log cabin with the current meeting house, using field stone. Originally, the structure had a balcony with stairs and four fireplaces in each of the corners. Also, a partition was included so that when closed, it provided warmth when only a few people attended meetings and provided space for business meetings. The meeting house was the area's first library and then the first school. It was open to all children, even those who could not afford the tuition. After the public school system was started in Pennsylvania, the meeting house became a public school (1806)

== Revolutionary and Civil Wars ==
During the winter of 1777–78, it was used as a hospital by the Continental Army at Valley Forge and staffed by Dr. Bodo Otto (1711–1787). Soldiers slept on the floor on straw and were warmed with the fireplaces. Distant wells provided water, and homemade candles and lanterns provided light. Many who died there were buried behind the meeting house. When the American Civil War came 80 years later, the Friends wanted to support the abolition of slavery and again offered their meeting house as a hospital. The soldiers must have slept in the balcony because on the walls are their scratched names, messages, and regimental numbers.

== Grange and Women's Club ==
After 1900 when many other religious sects came into the area, Uwchlan Friends began to move away or attend other churches. The few families left couldn't maintain the building, so they sold it to the Uwchlan Grange Patrons of Husbandry in 1920. The Grange continued to rent the building as a public school, and Grange members plus local 4H groups held meetings there. Once again dwindling members, this time of the Grange, meant maintenance was an issue, and the building was sold to the Woman's Community Club of Uwchlan in 1963. The understanding was that the Grange could meet there weekly. After the last members died or moved away, the Grange at Lionville was disbanded in 1974. The Women's Club put in running water and a heating system, converted the old east porch into a kitchen, and remodeled the west wing. But when faced with replacing the roof, they decided to sell the building to the newly formed Uwchlan Conservation Trust. The building was added to the National Register of Historic Places in 1973.
