= Brian Kelly (lacrosse) =

American lacrosse player

Personal information
- Nickname: BK
- Nationality: American
- Born: December 27, 1980 (age 45) West Chester, Pennsylvania, U.S.
- Height: 6 ft 5 in (196 cm)
- Weight: 210 lb (95 kg; 15 st 0 lb)

Sport
- Position: Defense
- Shoots: Right
- NLL draft: 69th overall, 2003; Anaheim Storm
- NLL teams: Anaheim Storm
- MLL teams: Los Angeles Riptide; San Francisco Dragons
- Pro career: 2003–

Brian Kelly (born December 27, 1980, in West Chester, Pennsylvania) is a professional lacrosse player. He has previously played for the San Francisco Dragons and the Los Angeles Riptide of Major League Lacrosse (MLL). He played college lacrosse for the Whittier College Poets in Los Angeles. Kelly attended high school at Downingtown High School in Downingtown, Pennsylvania, graduating in 1999.

== Professional career ==
Brian Kelly started his professional career in 2003 as a member of the Anaheim Storm of the National Lacrosse League (NLL). Kelly competed for the Anaheim Storm in each of the franchise's two seasons in the National Lacrosse League (2003–04 & 2004–05). He was drafted by the LA Riptide then after 2 years, Kelly was claimed by the San Francisco Dragons from the league player pool on March 19, 2007. Kelly made his debut for the Dragons on May 19, 2007, against the Denver Outlaws. Kelly recently rejoined the LA Riptide for the 2008 season.

== Collegiate career ==
A 2003 Whittier College graduate, Kelly was a two-time All-American and was selected to the North/South All-Star game after serving as captain during Whittier's 2003 Final Four run. He was recognized as the nation's top longstick midfielder in both his junior and senior seasons. Kelly finished his Whittier playing career with over 300 ground balls, as well as contributing over 40 points.

== Coaching career ==
After retiring from professional play, Kelly returned to Whittier College to coach. He started his coaching career as an assistant coach from 2004 to 2008. During the 2009 season, he was promoted as the interim head coach. After the season ended, he was named head coach of the program.

Kelly stepped down from the program in 2017. Over his nine years he accumulated a record of 60–49 and totaled five winning seasons, which included a berth into the NCAA Division III National Championships in 2016. He is now the director of 3d Southland, the regional designation of 3d Lacrosse covering Orange County and the Greater Los Angeles Area of Southern California.
