= Lionville, Pennsylvania =

Unincorporated community in Pennsylvania, US

- Census-designated place
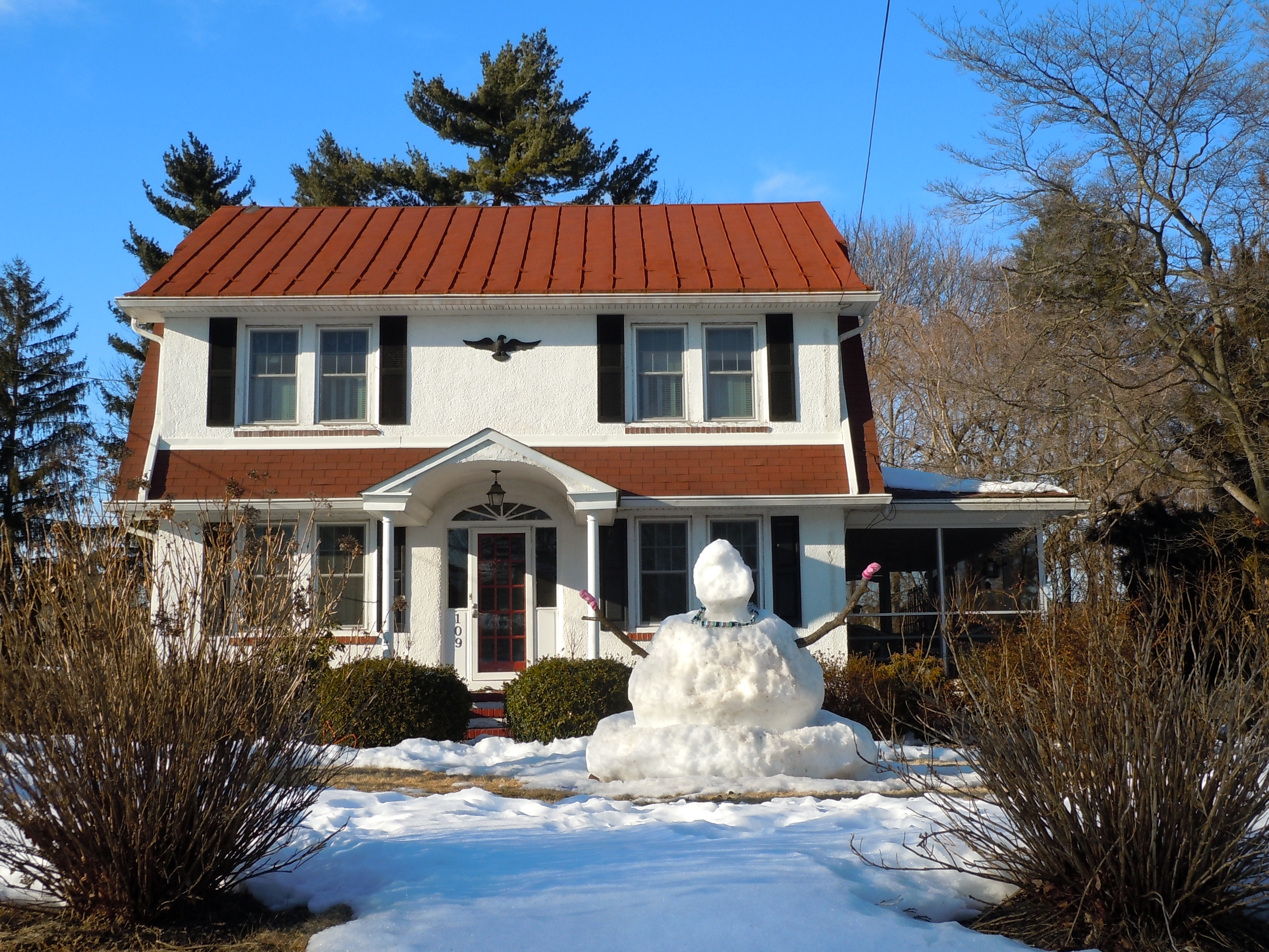
- House and snowman in Lionville

- Location of Lionsville in Chester County (left) and of Chester County in Pennsylvania (right)
- Coordinates: 40°03′10″N 75°38′43″W
- Country: United States
- State: Pennsylvania
- County: Chester
- Township: Uwchlan

Area
  - Total: 2.49 sq mi (6.44 km^{2})
  - Land: 2.47 sq mi (6.41 km^{2})
  - Water: 0.012 sq mi (0.03 km^{2})
- Elevation: 541 ft (165 m)

Population (2020)
  - Total: 6,582
  - Density: 2,658.6/sq mi (1,026.49/km^{2})
- Time zone: UTC-5 (EST)
  - Summer (DST): UTC-4 (EDT)
- ZIP Code: 19353
- Area codes: 610 and 484
- FIPS code: 42-43744

Lionville is a census-designated place (CDP) in Uwchlan Township, Pennsylvania, United States. The population was 6,189 at the 2010 census. Prior to 2010 the CDP was recorded as Lionville-Marchwood. "Marchwood", however, refers only to the housing development begun in the early 1960s that is located south of the 100-113 intersection.

Lionville is bisected by two major local highways, PA 100 and PA 113. The area contains residential neighborhoods, hotels, restaurants, and other businesses. The original name of the village was Welsh Pool but was changed to Red Lion. When the town asked for a post office the name Red Lion was denied because there were already too many towns with that name in PA. The government assigned them the name Lionville, and they kept it. The area of Lionville along Village Avenue is a protected historic district. The Friends Meeting House was used as a hospital by the Continental Army during the American Revolutionary War.

Lionville has an independent ZIP Code and post office, but it has never had mail delivery. Many of the long-term residents who picked up mail at the now-closed general store or fire station locations now use a Downingtown address. Because much of the area also falls under the Exton ZIP code, many Lionville businesses use the Exton name instead, especially if they do not have other locations in the area.

== Geography ==
Lionville-Marchwood is located at 40°3′10″N 75°38′43″W (40.052833, -75.645237).

According to the U.S. Census Bureau, the CDP has a total area of 2.5 square miles (6.5 km^{2}), all land.

== Demographics ==
Historical population
Census	Pop.	Note	%±
2000	6,298		—
2010	6,189		−1.7%
2020	6,582		6.3%

At the 2000 census, there were 6,298 people, 2,574 households and 1,719 families residing in the CDP. The population density was 2,542.9 inhabitants per square mile (981.8/km^{2}). There were 2,645 housing units at an average density of 1,068.0 per square mile (412.4/km^{2}). The racial makeup of the CDP was 92.32% White, 2.56% African American, 0.11% Native American, 3.72% Asian, 0.02% Pacific Islander, 0.27% from other races, and 1.02% from two or more races. Hispanic or Latino of any race were 1.21% of the population.

There were 2,574 households, of which 32.6% had children under the age of 18 living with them, 55.9% were married couples living together, 8.8% had a female householder with no husband present, and 33.2% were non-families. 26.1% of all households were made up of individuals, and 4.4% had someone living alone who was 65 years of age or older. The average household size was 2.45 and the average family size was 3.02.

24.7% of the population were under the age of 18, 6.4% from 18 to 24, 34.6% from 25 to 44, 25.2% from 45 to 64, and 9.1% who were 65 years of age or older. The median age was 36 years. For every 100 females, there were 96.3 males. For every 100 females age 18 and over, there were 91.6 males.

The median household income was $63,677 and the median family income was $73,500. Males had a median income of $51,294 compared with $33,199 for females. The per capita income for the CDP was $33,003. About 1.0% of families and 1.9% of the population were below the poverty line, including none of those under age 18 and 6.1% of those age 65 or over.

== Education ==
Lionville is located in the Downingtown Area School District.

The Lionville area is home to three schools: Lionville Elementary (outside of the CDP), Lionville Middle (in the CDP), and Downingtown East High School (outside of the CDP).

Lionville is zoned to Lionville Elementary, Lionville Middle, and Downingtown East High.
