= Uwchlan Township, Pennsylvania =

Township in Pennsylvania

Uwchlan Township
- Township
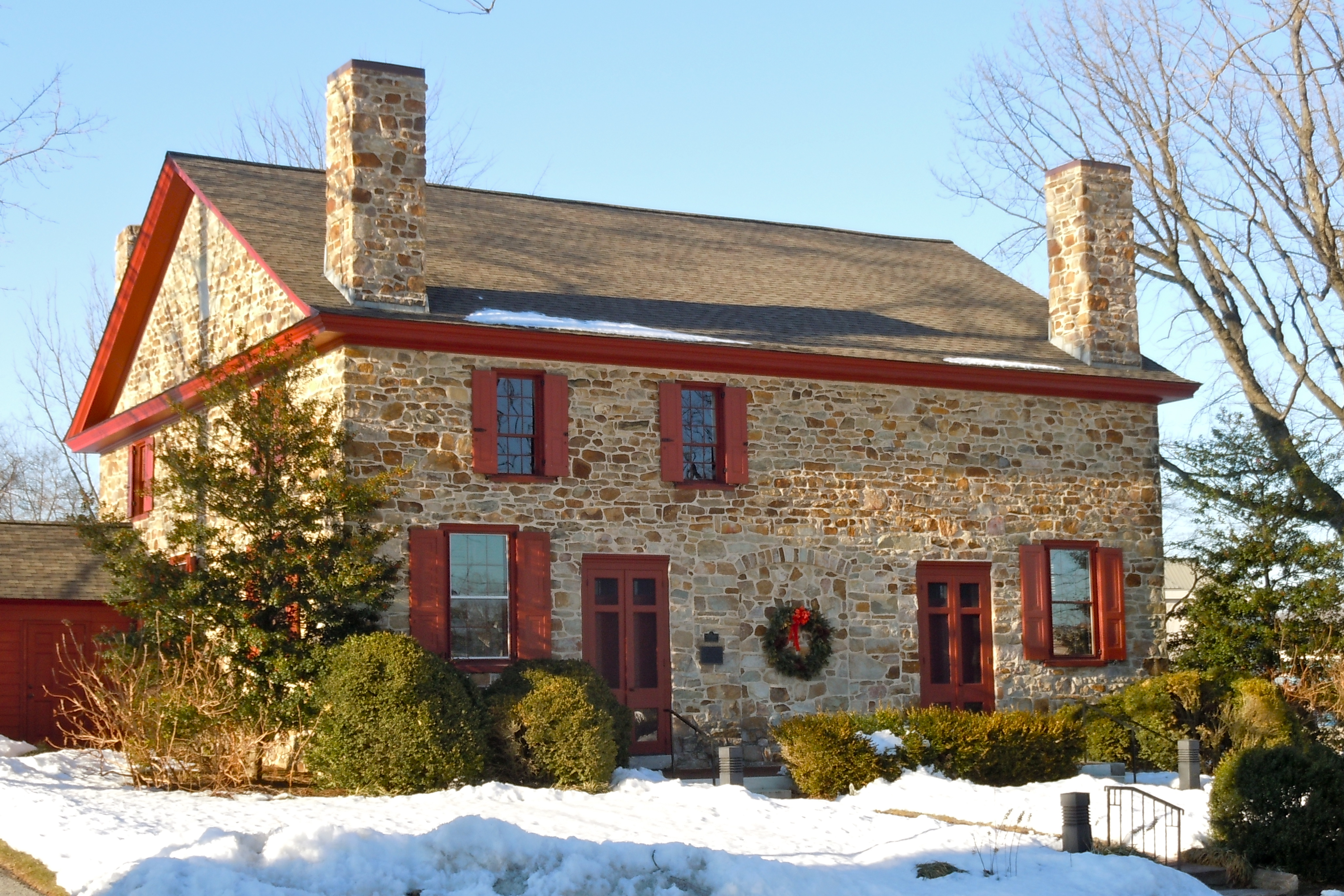
- Uwchlan Meetinghouse

- Seal

- Location of Uwchlan Township in Chester County and of Chester County in Pennsylvania

- Location of Pennsylvania in the United States
- Coordinates: 40°02′59″N 75°38′53″W
- Country: United States
- State: Pennsylvania
- County: Chester
- Founded: 1712

Government
  - Body: Board of Supervisors
  - Chairman: Bill Miller
  - Vice Chairman: Mayme Baumann

Area
  - Total: 10.46 sq mi (27.08 km^{2})
  - Land: 10.40 sq mi (26.93 km^{2})
  - Water: 0.058 sq mi (0.15 km^{2})
- Elevation: 522 ft (159 m)

Population (2010)
  - Total: 18,088
  - Estimate (2016): 18,977
  - Density: 1,824.8/sq mi (704.56/km^{2})
- Time zone: UTC-5 (EST)
  - Summer (DST): UTC-4 (EDT)
- Area code: 610
- FIPS code: 42-029-79480
- Website: www.uwchlan.com

Uwchlan Township (/ˈjuːklən/; Welsh: [ˈɪuxlan], "above the parish") is a township in Chester County, Pennsylvania. The population was 19,161 at the 2020 census.

== History ==
Most of the settlers emigrated from Wales. One of them, David Lloyd, who was a friend of William Penn's, sold large and small lots from the thousands that he owned. Because the land was hilly, the Welshmen call the area Uwchlan (in Welsh pronounced Iwchlan, with the 'ch' sound being the sound made when clearing one's throat) or "Youchlan," meaning Upland.

The Lionville Historic District and Uwchlan Meetinghouse are listed on the National Register of Historic Places.

== Geography ==
Uwchlan Township is located at 40°02′59″N 75°38′53″W at an elevation of 522 feet (159.1 m). According to the United States Census Bureau, the township has a total area of 10.4 square miles (27 km^{2}), all land. It contains the census-designated places of Eagleview and Lionville.

=== Adjacent municipalities ===
- Upper Uwchlan Township (north)
- West Pikeland Township (northeast)
- Charlestown Township (east)
- West Whiteland Township (southeast)
- East Caln Township (south)
- East Brandywine Township (west)

== Demographics ==
Historical population
Census	Pop.	Note	%±
1930	507		—
1940	599		18.1%
1950	761		27.0%
1960	995		30.7%
1970	5,473		450.1%
1980	8,364		52.8%
1990	12,999		55.4%
2000	16,576		27.5%
2010	18,088		9.1%
2020	19,161		5.9%

At the 2010 census, the township was 88.8% non-Hispanic White, 2.5% Black or African American, 0.1% Native American, 5.2% Asian, and 1.4% were two or more races. 2.3% of the population were of Hispanic or Latino ancestry.

As of the census of 2000, there were 16,576 people, 5,921 households, and 4,565 families residing in the township. The population density was 1,587.1 inhabitants per square mile (612.8/km^{2}). There were 6,030 housing units, at an average density of 577.4 per square mile (222.9/km^{2}). The racial makeup of the township was 93.67% White, 1.85% African American, 0.08% Native American, 3.24% Asian, 0.01% Pacific Islander, 0.31% from other races, and 0.86% from two or more races. Hispanic or Latino of any race were 1.24% of the population.

There were 5,921 households, of which 43.7% had children under the age of 18 living with them, 68.9% were married couples living together, 6.3% had a female householder with no husband present, and 22.9% were nonfamilies. 18.2% of all households were made up of individuals, and 3.8% had someone living alone who was 65 years of age or older. The average household size was 2.80, and the average family size was 3.24.

In the township, the population was spread out, with 30.2% under the age of 18, 5.2% from 18 to 24, 34.0% from 25 to 44, 24.1% from 45 to 64, and 6.6% who were 65 years of age or older. The median age was 36 years. For every 100 females, there were 96.5 males. For every 100 females age 18 and over, there were 92.9 males.

The median income for a household in the township was $81,985, and the median income for a family was $90,486. Males had a median income of $67,054 versus $35,658 for females. The per capita income for the township was $33,785. About 0.7% of families and 1.2% of the population were below the poverty line, including 0.3% of those under age 18 and 4.0% of those age 65 or over.

== Education ==
Uwchlan Township is home to six schools of the Downingtown Area School District:

- Lionville Elementary School
- Shamona Creek Elementary School
- Uwchlan Hills Elementary School
- Marsh Creek Sixth Grade Center
- Lionville Middle School
- Downingtown High School East Campus

Zoned elementary schools serving sections of the township include Shamona Creek, Uwchlan, Lionville, Pickering Valley (in Upper Uwchlan Township), and East Ward (in Downingtown Borough). Most of the township is zoned to Lionville Middle School and Downingtown East High School while some of it is zoned to Downingtown Middle School and Downingtown West High School.

== Transportation ==
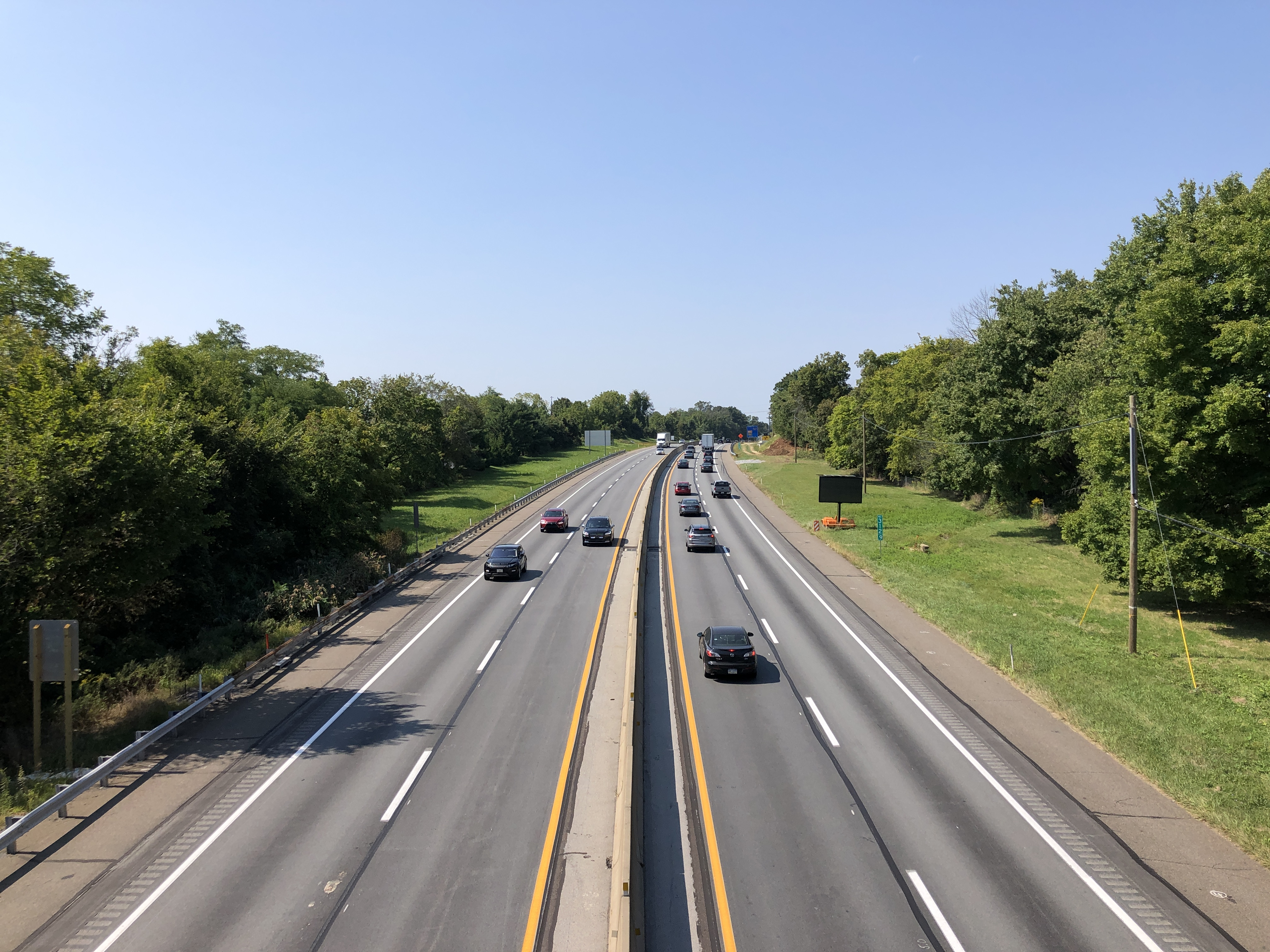
The Pennsylvania Turnpike/I-76 westbound in Uwchlan Township

As of 2018, there were 91.14 miles (146.68 km) of public roads in Uwchlan Township, of which 4.00 miles (6.44 km) were maintained by the Pennsylvania Turnpike Commission (PTC), 5.63 miles (9.06 km) were maintained by the Pennsylvania Department of Transportation (PennDOT) and 81.51 miles (131.18 km) were maintained by the township.

The most prominent road serving Uwchlan Township is the Pennsylvania Turnpike (I-76). It crosses the northern part of the township on an east–west alignment.

Exit 312 of the Turnpike connects it to Pennsylvania Route 100 (Pottstown Pike), which runs from the southeast near Exton in West Whiteland Township to the northwest, near Eagle in Upper Uwchlan Township. Route 100 is a four-lane divided highway from West Whiteland Township to Route 113, where it becomes a six-lane divided highway to Upper Uwchlan Township.

Route 113 (Uwchlan Avenue) runs from the southwest, near Downingtown, East Caln Township and an interchange with US 30 to the northeast, near Chester Springs in West Pikeland Township. The two roads cross in the village of Lionville. Route 113 is a two-lane highway from East Caln Township to Peck Road, at which point it becomes a four-lane highway (with a center turn lane) all the way to West Pikeland Township.

The northern terminus of the Struble Trail, a multi-use rail trail, is located on Dorlan's Mill Road in the township.

== See also ==
- Welsh Tract
