= Big Apple (disambiguation) =

The Big Apple is a nickname for New York City, United States.

Big Apple or The Big Apple may also refer to:

- Big Apple (Amtrak train), a train operated by Amtrak, now merged into the Keystone Service
- Central of Georgia "Big Apple", a nickname for train engines on the Central of Georgia Railway
- Big Apple (club), a nightclub in Munich, established in 1963
- Big Apple (Colborne, Ontario), a roadside attraction in Colborne, Ontario, Canada
- Big Apple Circus, a circus in New York City
- Big Apple Comix, an early independent comic book
- Big Apple (dance), a swing/jazz-era dance
- "The Big Apple", a 1937 song about the dance, recorded by Tommy Dorsey with Edythe Wright
- "Big Apple Rappin'", a 1980 rap single by Spyder-D
- "Big Apple" (song), a 1983 single by the British New Wave band Kajagoogoo
- Big Apple Township, Oregon County, Missouri
- Big Apple (TV series), a short-lived cop drama TV series on CBS
- The Big Apple (Waitomo), a tourist attraction in Waitomo, New Zealand
- Iso Omena (literally "Big Apple"), a shopping centre in Matinkylä, Espoo, Finland

== See also ==
- Little Apple (disambiguation)
