= Coatesville station =

Amtrak rail station in Pennsylvania, US

Coatesville, PA
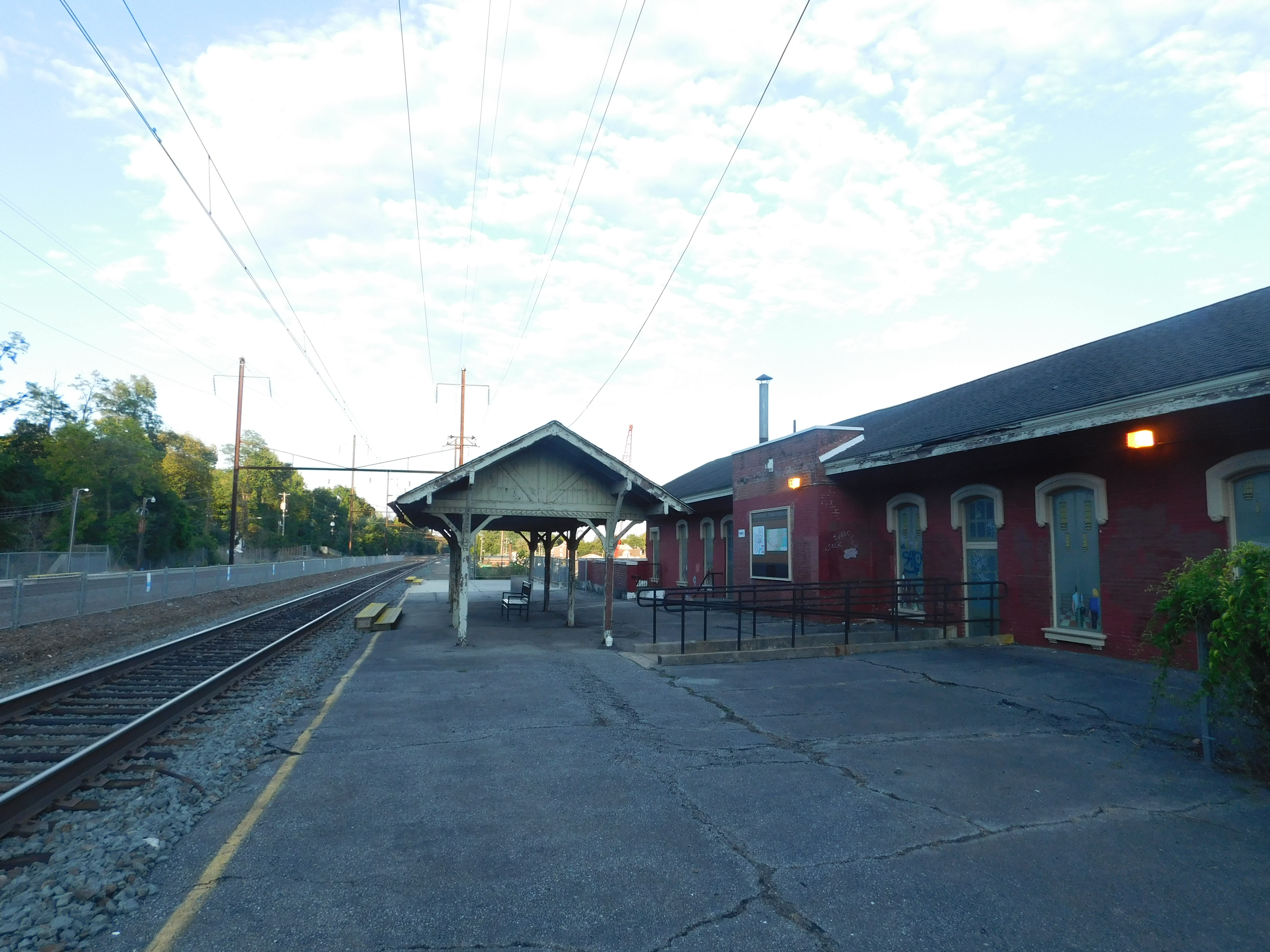
- The eastbound platform and disused station building in 2022

General information
- Location: Third Avenue and Fleetwood Street; Coatesville, Pennsylvania; United States
- Coordinates: 39°59′9″N 75°49′15″W
- Owner: Amtrak
- Line: Amtrak Philadelphia to Harrisburg Main Line (Keystone Corridor)
- Platforms: 2 side platforms
- Tracks: 3
- Connections: SEPTA Suburban Bus: 135; TMACC: Coatesville Link

Other information
- Station code: Amtrak: COT

History
- Opened: 1830s
- Rebuilt: 1868; 2021–2025 (under construction)
- Electrified: January 15, 1938

Passengers
- FY 2025: 15,220 annually (Amtrak)

Services
Preceding station	Amtrak	Following station
Parkesburg toward Harrisburg	Keystone Service	Downingtown toward New York
Pennsylvanian does not stop here
Former services
Preceding station	Amtrak	Following station
Parkesburg toward Pittsburgh	Pennsylvanian	Downingtown toward New York
Preceding station	SEPTA	Following station
Parkesburg Terminus	Parkesburg Line	Downingtown toward Suburban Station
Preceding station	Pennsylvania Railroad	Following station
Pomeroy toward Chicago	Main Line	Caln toward New York or Exchange Place
Future services
Preceding station	SEPTA	Following station
Terminus	Paoli/Thorndale Line	Thorndale toward Temple University
Location

Coatesville station is an Amtrak intercity rail station located in Coatesville, Pennsylvania. It is served by most Amtrak Keystone Service trains. The station has two side platforms serving the outer tracks of the three-track Philadelphia to Harrisburg Main Line.

== History ==
Coatesville station opened during the 1830s on the Philadelphia and Columbia Railroad, which later became part of the Main Line of the Pennsylvania Railroad (PRR). The railroad built a two-story Italianate brick depot, now disused, in 1868. Amtrak took over Philadelphia–Harrisburg Silverliner Service (now Keystone Service) from PRR successor Penn Central in 1972.

The SEPTA Regional Rail Parkesburg Line served Coatesville from 1990 to 1996, when service to Downingtown was reduced due to budget cuts.

=== Reconstruction ===
In summer 2013, the Chester County Economic Development Council announced the selection of a developer for a project to revitalize the Coatesville station area. Total costs will be dependent on final design and engineering estimates, but the Pennsylvania Department of Transportation (PennDOT) has pledged approximately $20 million to the project. Under the plan, a new station with parking would be built just east of the historic depot, along the tracks between Third and Fourth Avenues.

SEPTA indicated in March 2019 that Regional Rail service would be extended from Thorndale to Coatesville "in the near future." The $21 million project was put out to bid in July 2021, with construction planned to last from late 2021 to 2025. A $1.65 million parking garage will also be built. A groundbreaking ceremony was held on October 22, 2021, with Governor Tom Wolf in attendance.

== Gallery ==
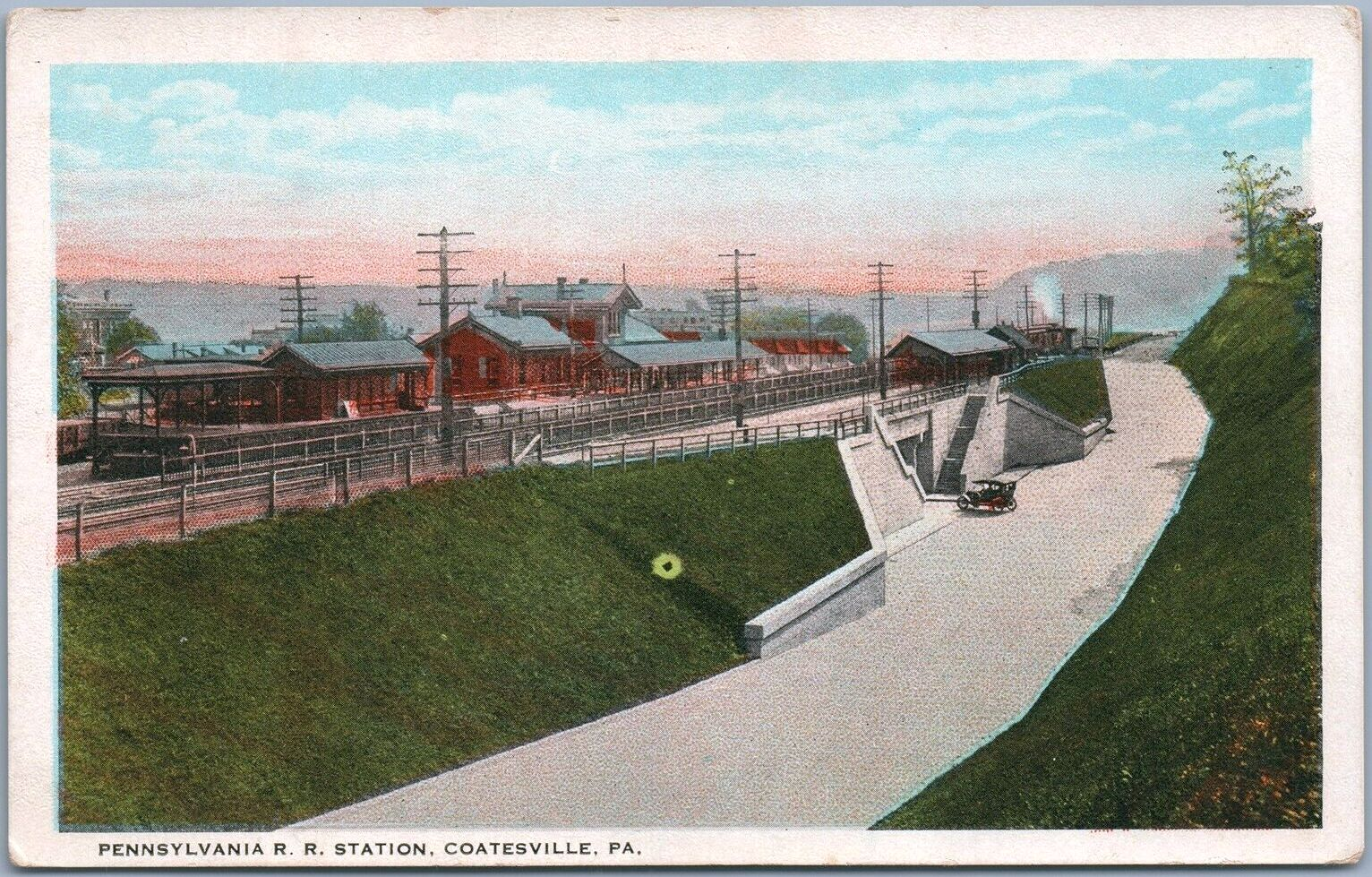
c. 1920s postcard of Coatesville station

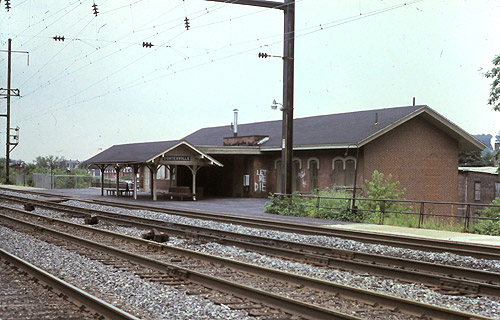
Coatesville station in 1984
