= Downingtown station =

Rail station in Downingtown, Pennsylvania

Downingtown
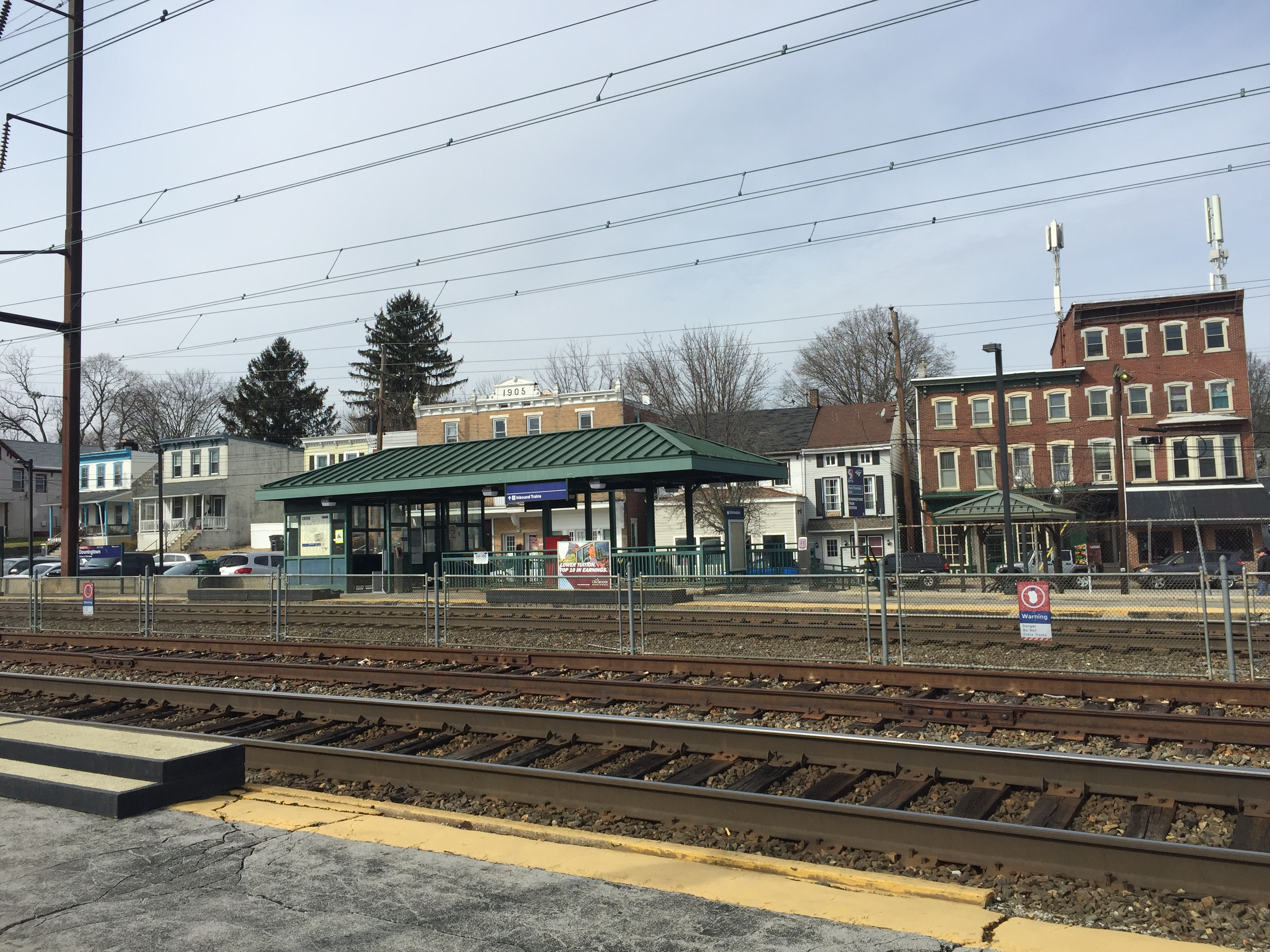
- Station with downtown Downingtown in the background

General information
- Location: 159 Viaduct Avenue; Downingtown, Pennsylvania; United States
- Coordinates: 40.002545°N 75.710363°W
- Owner: Amtrak
- Line: Amtrak Philadelphia to Harrisburg Main Line (Keystone Corridor)
- Platforms: 2 side platforms
- Tracks: 3
- Connections: SEPTA Suburban Bus: 135

Construction
- Structure type: Enclosed plexiglas shelters
- Parking: 360 spaces (226 daily, 134 municipal)
- Cycle facilities: 2 racks (4 spaces)
- Accessible: No

Other information
- Station code: Amtrak: DOW
- Fare zone: 4 (SEPTA)

History
- Opened: October 7, 1834
- Rebuilt: 1862; 1892; 1992
- Electrified: January 15, 1938

Key dates
- February 24, 1992: Pennsylvania Railroad depot burned

Passengers
- FY 2025: 60,830 annually (Amtrak)
- 2017: 291 boardings 312 alightings (weekday average) (SEPTA)
- Rank: 92 of 146 (SEPTA)

Services
Preceding station	Amtrak	Following station
Coatesville toward Harrisburg	Keystone Service	Exton toward New York
Pennsylvanian does not stop here
Preceding station	SEPTA	Following station
Thorndale Terminus	Paoli/Thorndale Line	Whitford toward Temple University
Former services
Preceding station	Amtrak	Following station
Coatesville toward Harrisburg	Keystone Service Before 1988	Whitford toward Philadelphia–Suburban
Lancaster toward Pittsburgh	Pennsylvanian	Exton toward New York
Preceding station	SEPTA	Following station
Coatesville Closed 1996 toward Parkesburg	Parkesburg Line Discontinued 1996	Whitford toward Suburban Station
Preceding station	Pennsylvania Railroad	Following station
Thorndale toward Chicago	Main Line	Woodbine toward New York or Exchange Place
Location

Downingtown station is an active commuter and intercity passenger railroad station in the eponymous borough of Downingtown, Chester County, Pennsylvania. Located on Viaduct Avenue to the south and U.S. Route 30 Business (Lincoln Highway) to the north, Downingtown station serves trains of SEPTA Regional Rail's Paoli/Thorndale Line and Amtrak's Keystone Service. Amtrak's Pennsylvanian bypasses the station. Downingtown station consists of two low-level side platforms with two station shelters and a parking lot on the Viaduct Avenue side of the tracks.

Railroad service in Downingtown began on October 7, 1834 with the completion of the second track of the Philadelphia and Columbia Railroad. After originally using a local tavern alongside the tracks as a station, a proper station was built in 1862 on Lancaster Avenue near a local railroad hotel. This station depot was demolished and replaced in 1892 with a structure at Viaduct Avenue. This new station, built by the Pennsylvania Railroad, was a Queen Anne style depot with a slate roof and two chimneys. A fire on the morning of February 24, 1992 resulted in the demolition of the structure and replacement with open shelters.

As part of upgrades to the Keystone Corridor, Downingtown station is expected to be upgraded. The station would be relocated eastward from Viaduct Avenue to the bridge where U.S. Route 322 (Brandywine Avenue) passed under the tracks. The work would include the construction of a new depot and expanded parking.

== History ==
The 1892 station depot at Downingtown caught fire in the early morning of February 24, 1992. By the time firefighters arrived by 3:00 a.m., the brick station building was aflame in its entirety and that the building lost a wall within several minutes. With the high intensity blaze, the firefighters chose to not douse the interior flames, which reached through the roof and windows. The firefighters took control of the burning structure around 4:37 a.m. However, the station depot was a total loss, with $200,000 in damage. The station fire caused few delays to Amtrak and SEPTA service, which was already back to normal by the time the destroyed station was removed from the site. Amtrak officials announced that the railroad would not enforce their normal surcharge for purchasing a ticket on board.

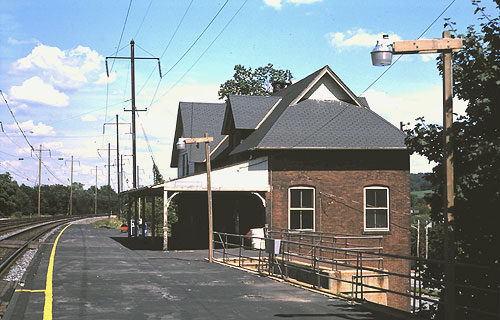
The 1892 station depot in August 1985

10 days after the fire, the Chester County Fire Marshal said that they could not find an immediate cause for the February 24 blaze but that Pennsylvania State Police in Embreeville was continuing to investigate the fire. Downingtown officials noted that they had not intervened on the decision to build a new station. Citing a preference to leave the decision making up to Amtrak and SEPTA, the municipality added that they wanted a new station but understand that they had no final say in construction decision. Downingtown Mayor Anthony Madiro noted that the municipality did not have the funding from taxpayers in order to put money into construction of a new station.

In early May 1992, SEPTA workers began construction of new 28-foot (8.5 m) plexiglass shelters on each side of the tracks. SEPTA stated that they were building the new station as part of a requirement to maintain the station as part of its lease of Amtrak. These new structures would cost $45,000. At that time, neither SEPTA or Amtrak wanted to accept responsibility of who would build it, resulting in slow progress. Amtrak also requested that SEPTA pay it for the $300,000 value of the burned station depot. The expectation was that the new station shelters would be in place by the end of June 1992. SEPTA and Amtrak were both running independent investigations on the fire, with Amtrak working with Downingtown police. They stated that they would release findings for the fire by the end of June. New passenger shelters were placed at the station, with the eastbound platform shelter placed on the foundation of the destroyed station building.

SEPTA's proposals to build a new station at Thorndale in Caln Township in June 1996 upset local residents in Downingtown. With the shelters SEPTA installed in 1992 falling apart and riddled with graffiti, they wondered what the point of building a new station was with Downingtown station in disrepair. SEPTA officials stated that they chose the Thorndale location for a new park and ride station because of land to allow for expanded parking (450 versus the combined 380 at Downingtown, Whitford and Exton). The station would also serve as the new western terminus of some trains for the R5 Paoli line, replacing Downingtown. Chester County officials and Rep. Curt Weldon pressured SEPTA to both build a new station at Thorndale and rehabilitate the station at Downingtown. However, SEPTA stated that they had no capital money to rehabilitate Downingtown station, despite the fact it was their responsibility as part of the lease from Amtrak.

The deteriorating conditions reached a high point by July 1998, with Barry Cassidy, the president of the local Main Street group, pushing the municipality to spend $25,000 on a study about the future of Downingtown station done by the Delaware Valley Regional Planning Commission. Cassidy stated that the station was the lynchpin to development in Downingtown and that a new station would go a long way in their success. Conditions at Downingtown station had gotten to poor lighting, continued graffiti of the property and urine all over the passenger tunnel. The plexiglass shelters were also leaking and paint was peeling. Several pieces of wood on the wooden shelters were also missing.

Amtrak also stated that they had plans to move the yard in Downingtown to a new location outside the municipality. They also had interest in finding someone to offer money on a private basis to build a new station. Cassidy wanted the station to be a part of the new Keystone Opportunity Zone, a state program proposed in Harrisburg that would help make development on a reduced tax rate.

SEPTA did minor renovation work in 1999, replacing the station shelters at Downingtown at the cost of $800,000. The renovations also added a new center track fence to promote use the pedestrian tunnel, new lighting, landscaping, and sidewalks. New signage was also installed for people to use. The station shelters were also painted green. SEPTA held a commemoration ceremony on October 1, 1999 to promote their work on the station as part of the greater project on the R5. Thorndale station opened on November 22, 1999.

== Future ==
In July 2021, the Pennsylvania Department of Transportation (PennDOT) announced that Downingtown station would be replaced with a new station moved east to the Brandywine Avenue (U.S. Route 322) underpass of the Keystone Corridor. The location of the current station at Viaduct Avenue being on a curve and its elevation over the street made it tough to build a new Americans with Disabilities Act-compliant station. By moving the station east, the new structure would be on a straight stretch of track, which was limited in the borough. The new station would be on both sides of Brandywine Avenue, which would get a new bridge in the process, replacing the 12-foot (3.7 m) clearance structure with one that reached 16 feet (4.9 m). Brandywine Avenue would gain wider traffic lanes and a turning lane, along with new shoulders and sidewalks. Elevators would be provided on each corner of the new station. The new Downingtown station would also have expanded parking, offering 480 spaces for commuters. A new pedestrian bridge would be provided to reach Johnsontown Park in Downingtown and a new kiss and ride loop would be provided at the new station. The Federal Transit Administration and the state of Pennsylvania provided $20 million for the design of the new station and related work on the right-of-way, with construction expected to begin in 2025.

In order to begin construction of the new station, railroad engineers had to remove DOWNS interlocking, which served an abandoned freight spur, located at the Brandywine Avenue crossing. This work was done by May 2026. Because of construction, utility lines would have to be moved to remove a conflict with the location. Utility poles would be replaced at Brandywine Avenue, Reed Street and Boot Road. Construction would be expected to being in the later half of May 2026. The utility relocation would be done on a 24-hour 7-day a week basis to reduce interference on the tracks and expected to be finished by November 2026. Changes in late May 2026 would also include Amtrak changing the overhead catenary wires during nights for several months. Construction of the new station and bridge over Brandywine Avenue would begin in the middle of 2027.

== Station layout ==
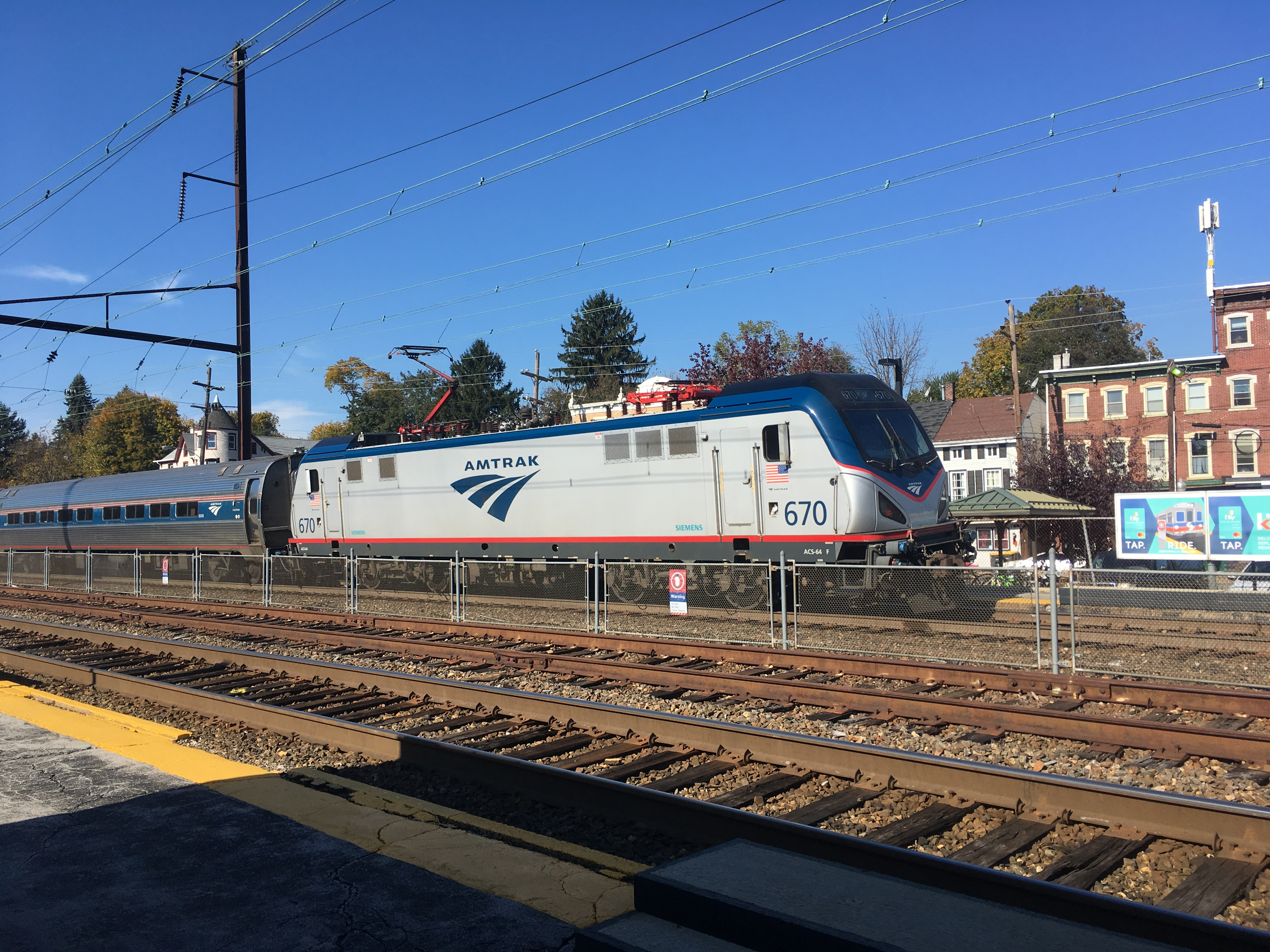
Harrisburg-bound Amtrak Keystone Service train in November 2018

Downingtown station consists of two low-level side platforms that serve SEPTA's Paoli/Thorndale Line between Caln Township and Philadelphia. There are three tracks, of which are in regular passenger service. The westbound platform is accessible from U.S. Route 30 Business (West Lancaster Avenue/Lincoln Highway). The eastbound platform follows Viaduct Aveune. Downingtown station has two parking lots consisting of 445 spaces on Viaduct Avenue, one of which is operated by SEPTA, the second of which is operated by the borough. The station's lots have a $2 daily parking fee, operated 21 hours a day. Parking is prohibited in the other three hours per day. Downingtown station sits in fare zone number 4 for SEPTA. SEPTA's 135 bus from West Chester Transit Center to Coatesville operates at the station.

Amtrak's Keystone Service between Harrisburg Transportation Center and New York Pennsylvania Station makes stops at Downingtown station.

== Gallery ==
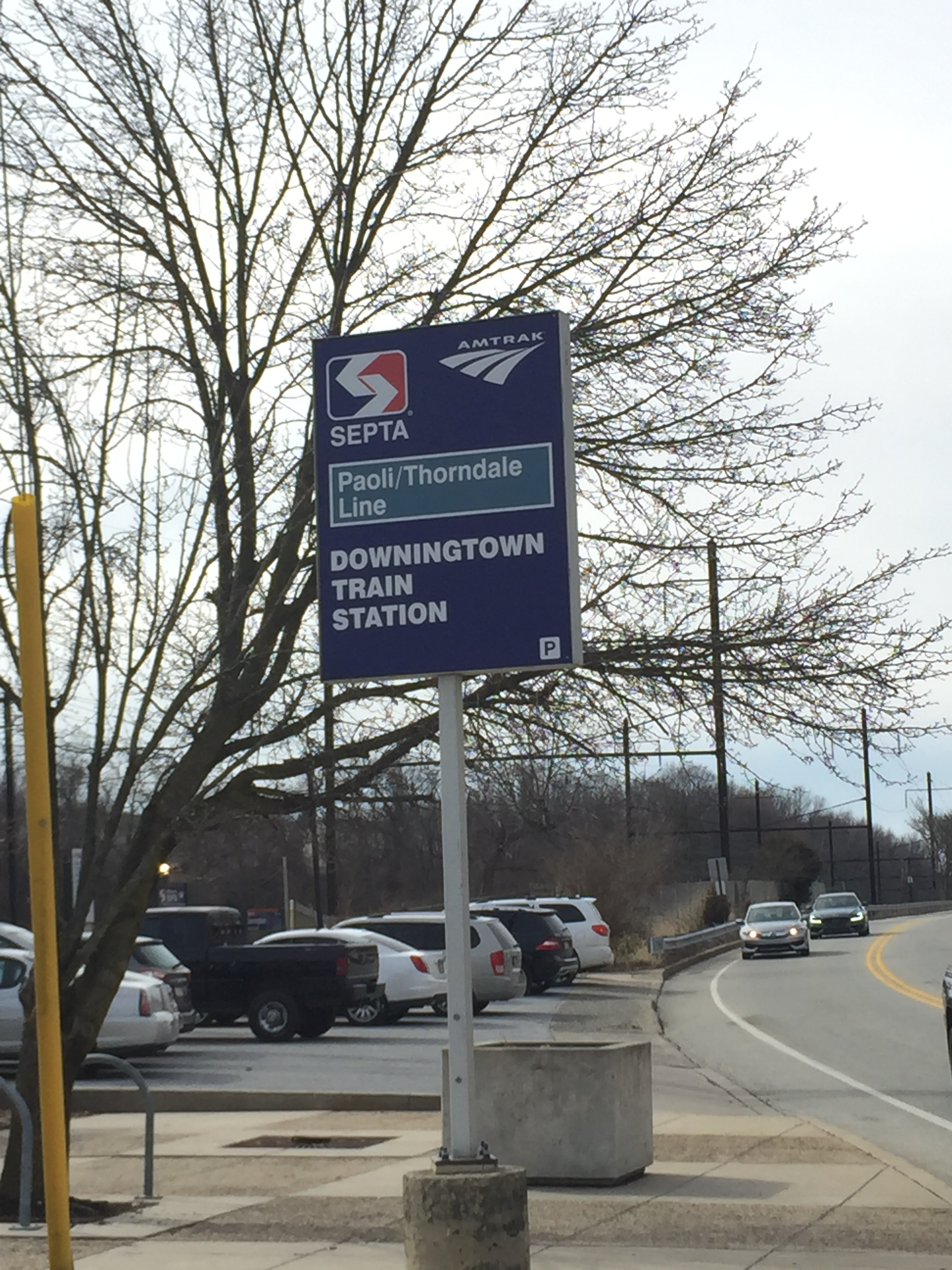
Station entrance sign

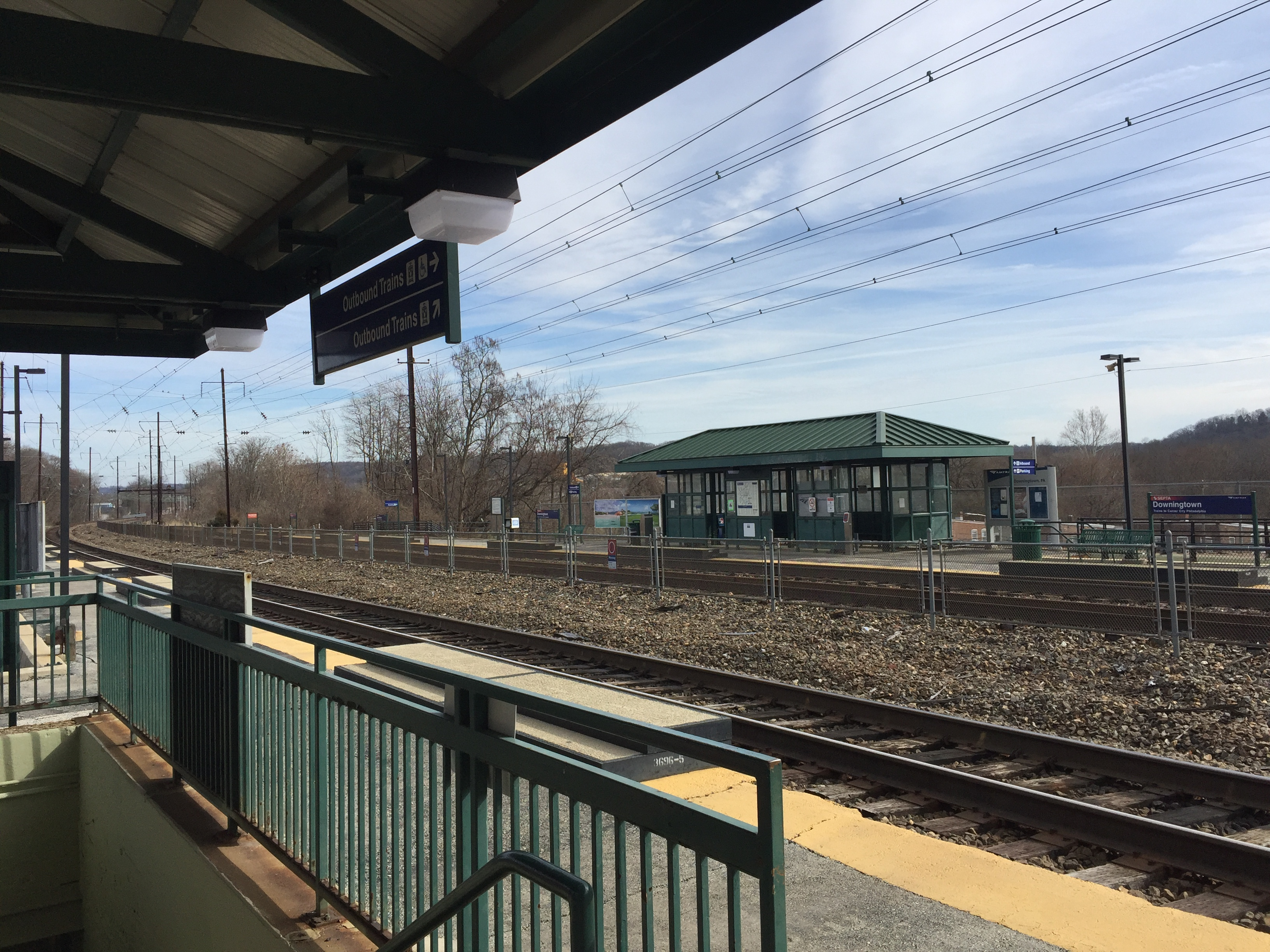
Station platform

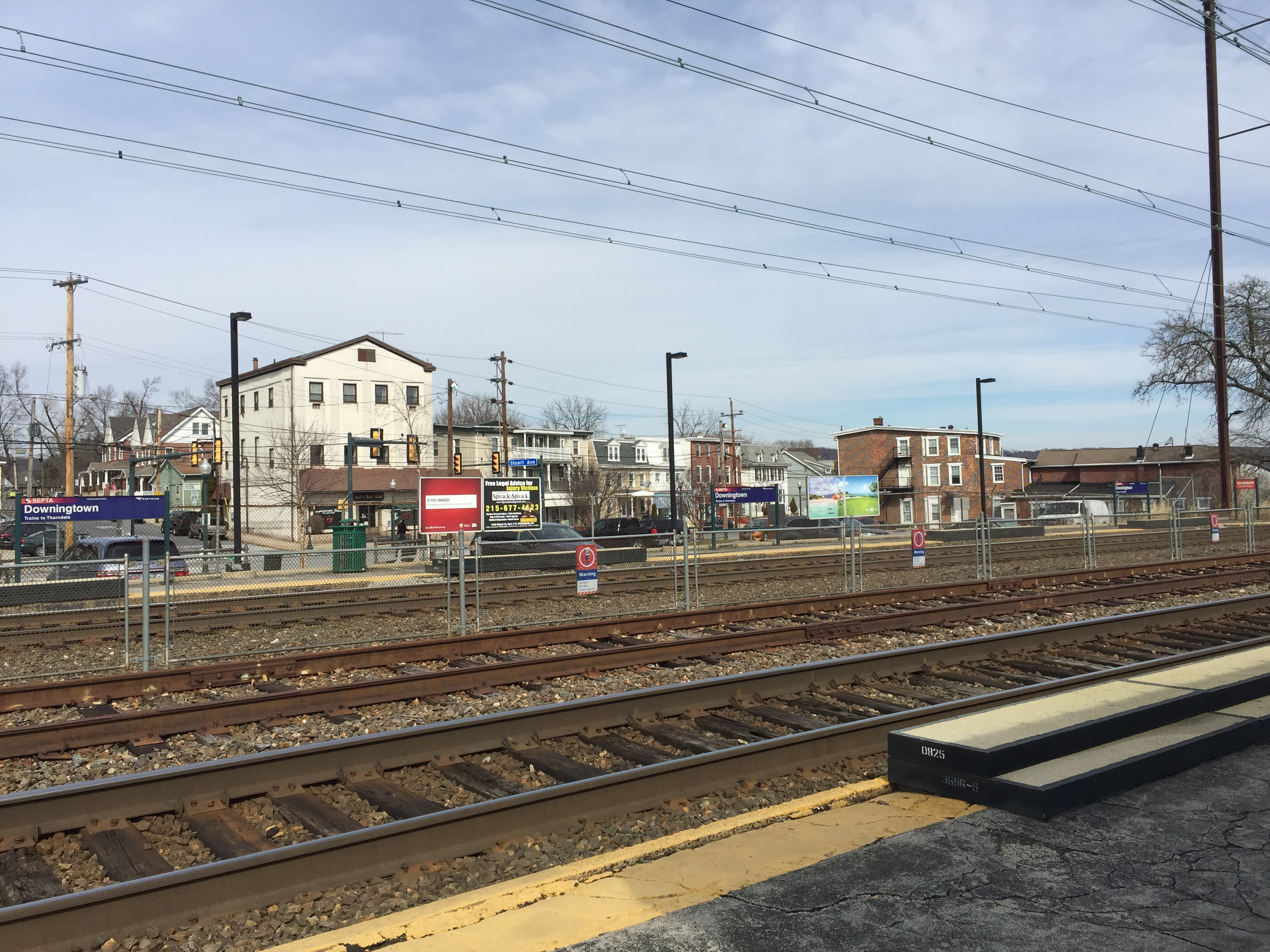
Station with downtown in background

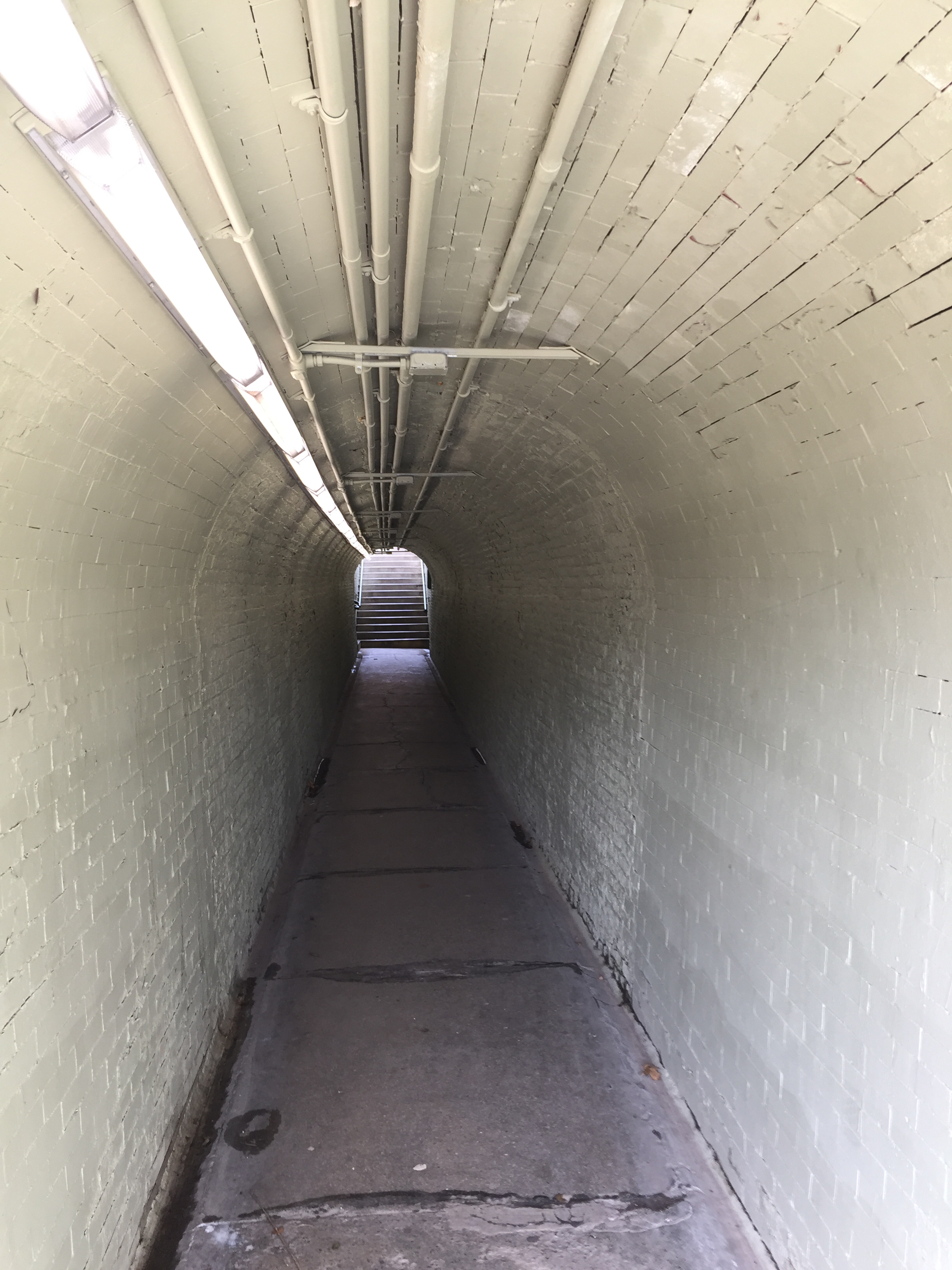
Transfer tunnel

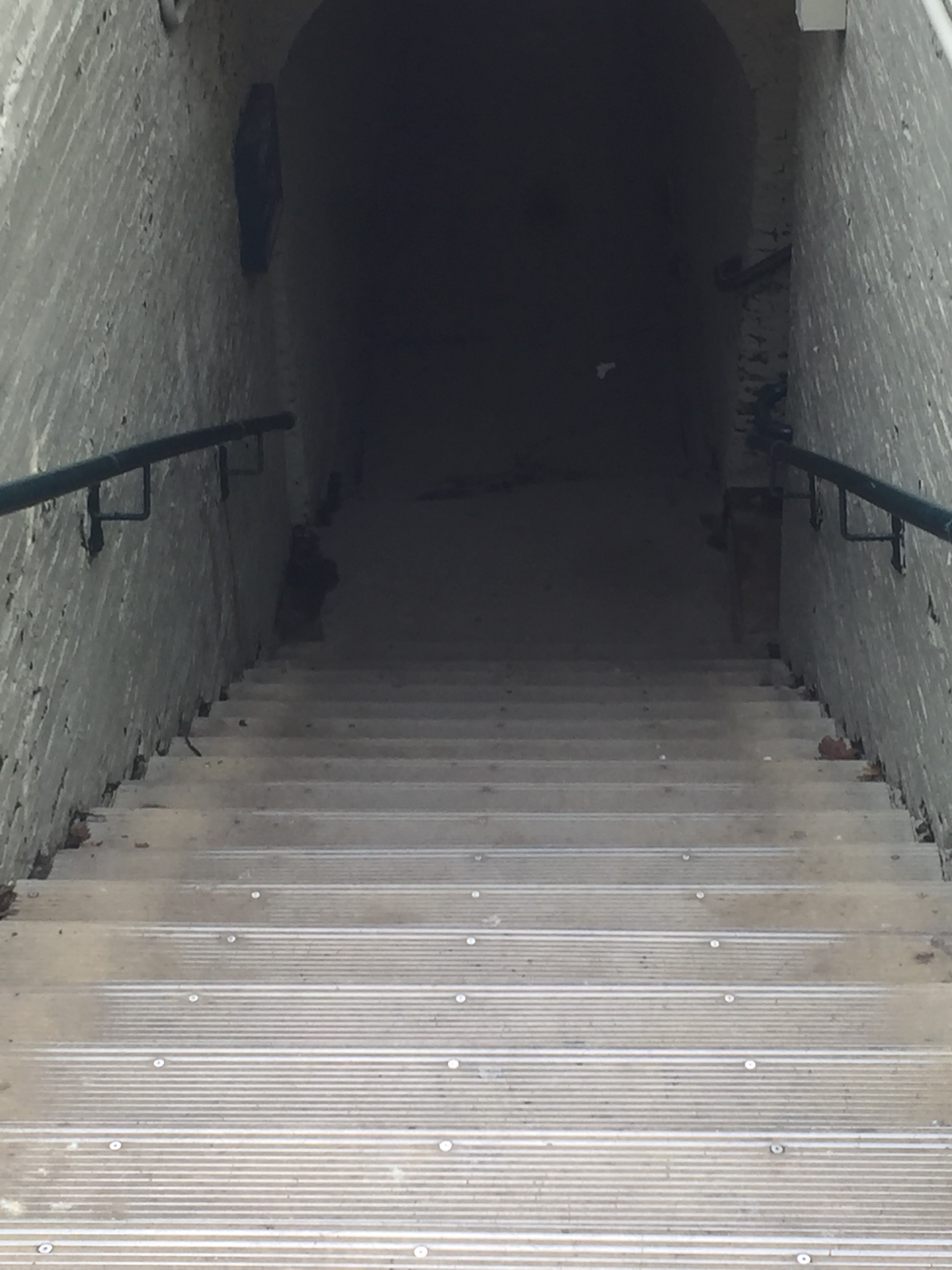
Stairs to the tunnel

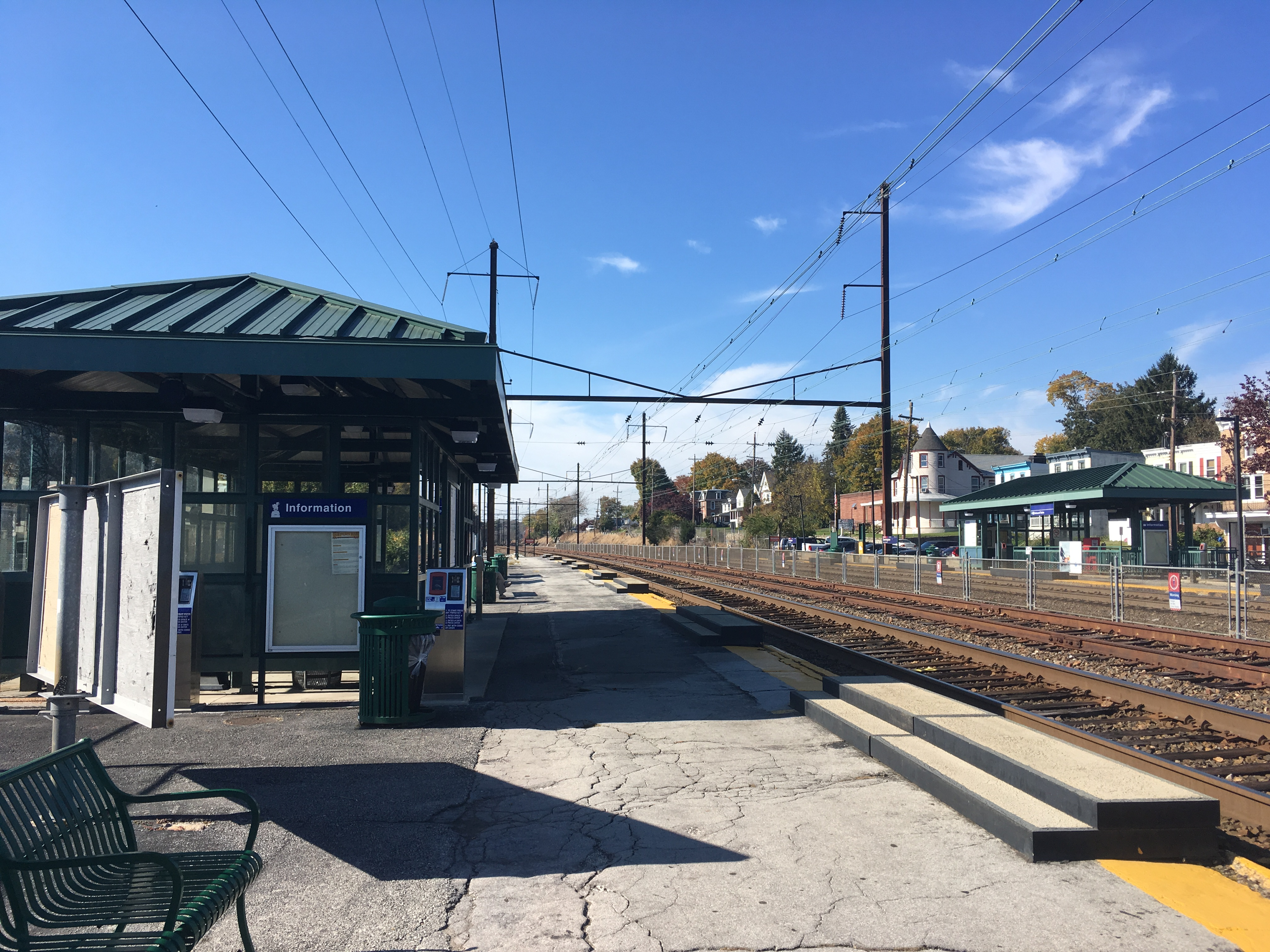
Philadelphia-bound platform at Downingtown station

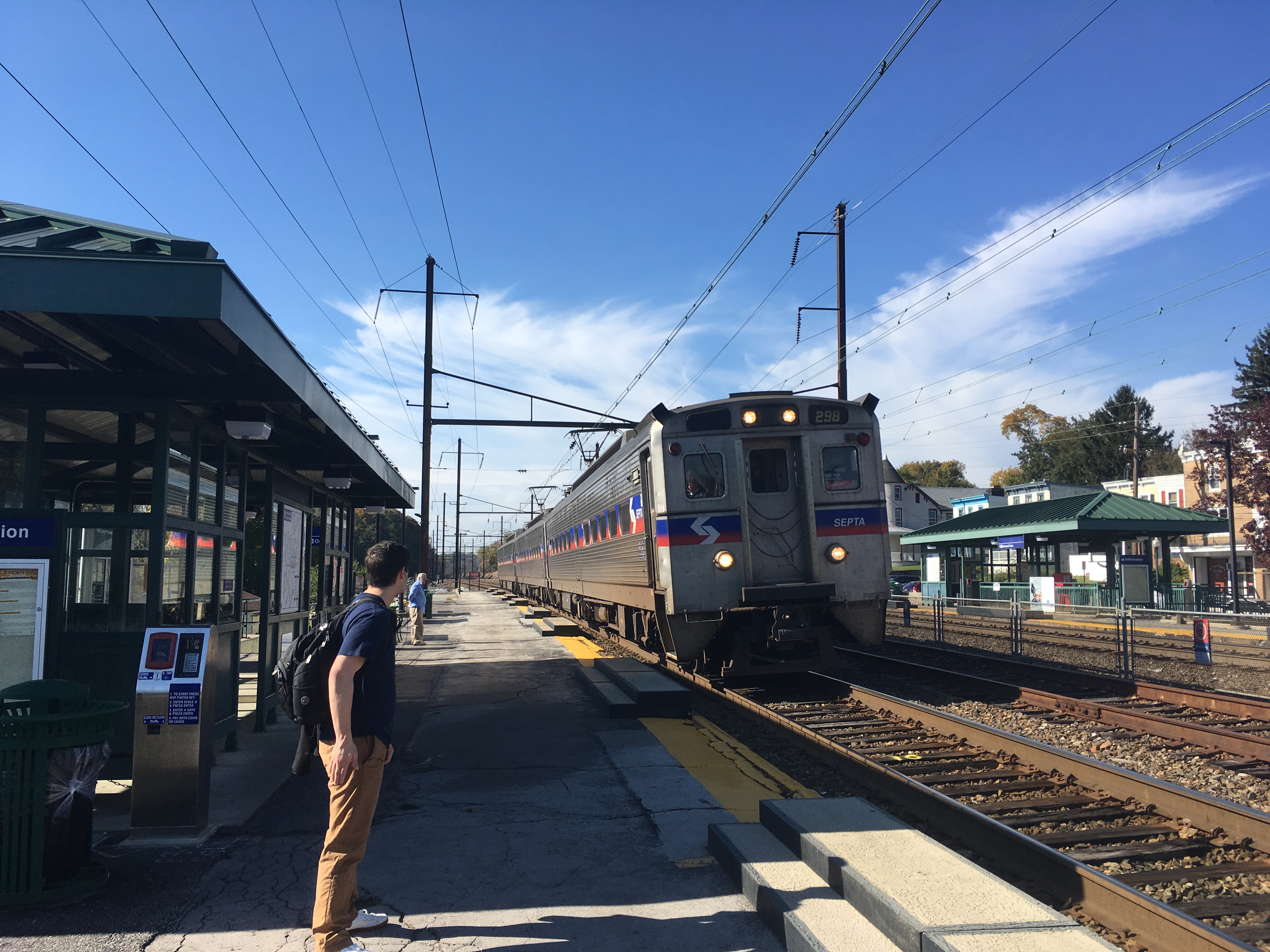
Philadelphia-bound SEPTA Paoli/Thorndale Line train stops at Downingtown station in November 2018

== Bibliography ==
- Hocker, Edward W. (1960). "Montgomery County History" (PDF). Bulletin of the Historical Society of Montgomery County Pennsylvania. XII (2, 3).
