= Exton station (Pennsylvania) =

Railway station in Pennsylvania

Exton
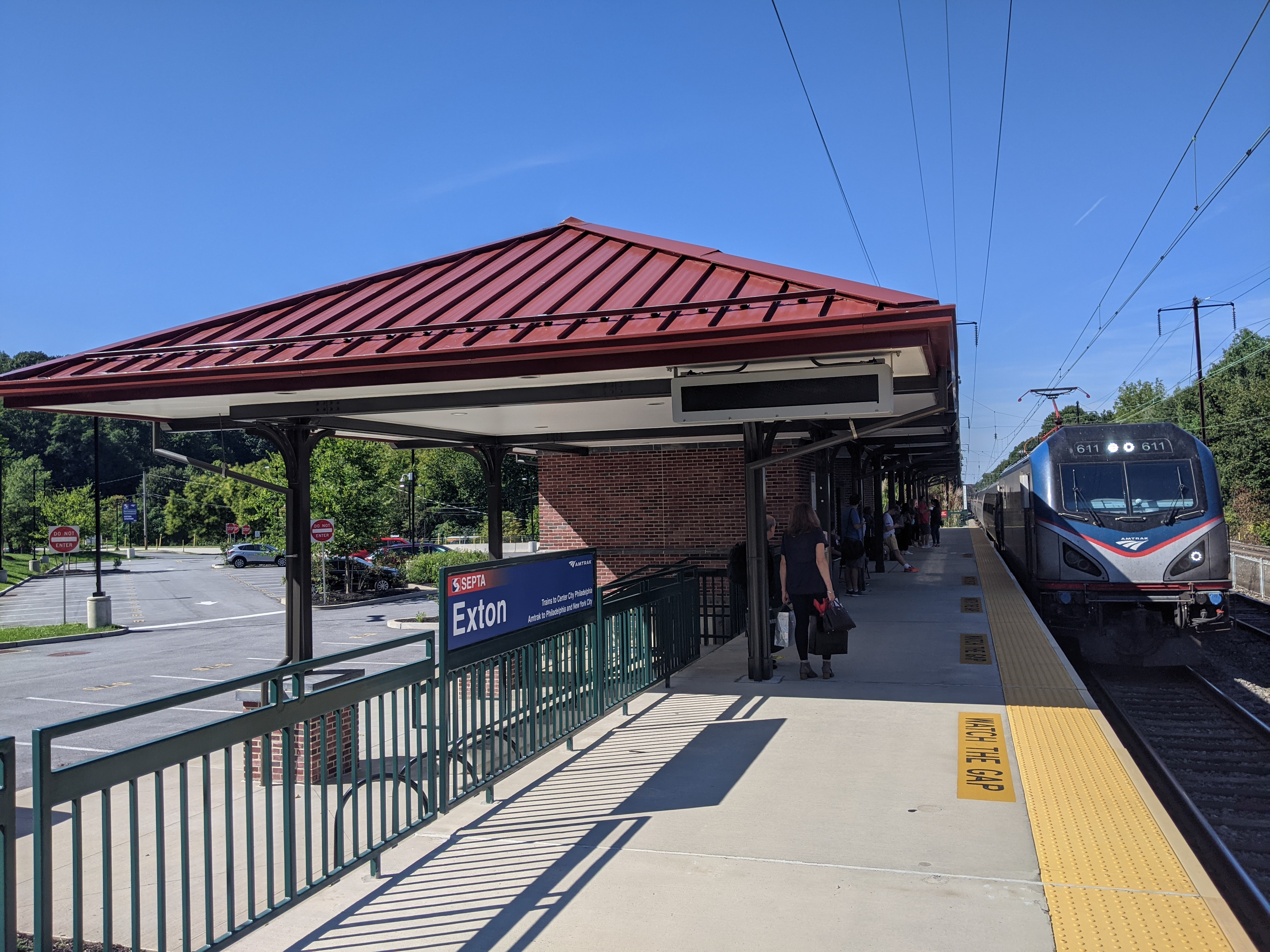
- An eastbound Keystone Service train at Exton in 2021

General information
- Location: 445 Walkertown Road; Exton, Pennsylvania; United States
- Coordinates: 40.0195°N 75.6218°W
- Owner: Amtrak
- Line: Amtrak Philadelphia to Harrisburg Main Line (Keystone Corridor)
- Platforms: 2 side platforms
- Tracks: 3
- Connections: SEPTA Suburban Bus: 135; West Chester University shuttle

Construction
- Parking: 643 spaces (555 daily, 88 permit)
- Cycle facilities: 4 racks (8 spaces)
- Accessible: Yes

Other information
- Station code: Amtrak: EXT
- Fare zone: 4 (SEPTA)

History
- Rebuilt: 1981, 2020
- Former names: Whiteland

Passengers
- FY 2025: 143,463 annually (Amtrak)
- 2017: 627 boardings 522 alightings (weekday average) (SEPTA)
- Rank: 36 of 146 (SEPTA)

Services
Preceding station	Amtrak	Following station
Downingtown toward Harrisburg	Keystone Service	Paoli toward New York
Pennsylvanian does not stop here
Preceding station	SEPTA	Following station
Whitford toward Thorndale	Paoli/Thorndale Line	Malvern toward Temple University
Former services
Preceding station	Amtrak	Following station
Whitford toward Harrisburg	Keystone Service Before 1988	Malvern toward Philadelphia–Suburban
Lancaster One-way operation	Pennsylvanian (Eastbound only)	Paoli toward New York
Preceding station	Pennsylvania Railroad	Following station
Whitford toward Chicago	Main Line	Ship Road toward New York or Exchange Place
Location

Exton station is a train station in Exton, West Whiteland Township, Pennsylvania, in the western suburbs of Philadelphia. It is served by most Amtrak Keystone Service trains, as well as SEPTA's Paoli/Thorndale Line. The station has two accessible high-level platforms serving the outer tracks of the three-track Philadelphia to Harrisburg Main Line. The platforms were built as part of a renovation completed in 2020.
