= Parkesburg station =

Railway station in Parkesburg, Pennsylvania

Parkesburg, PA
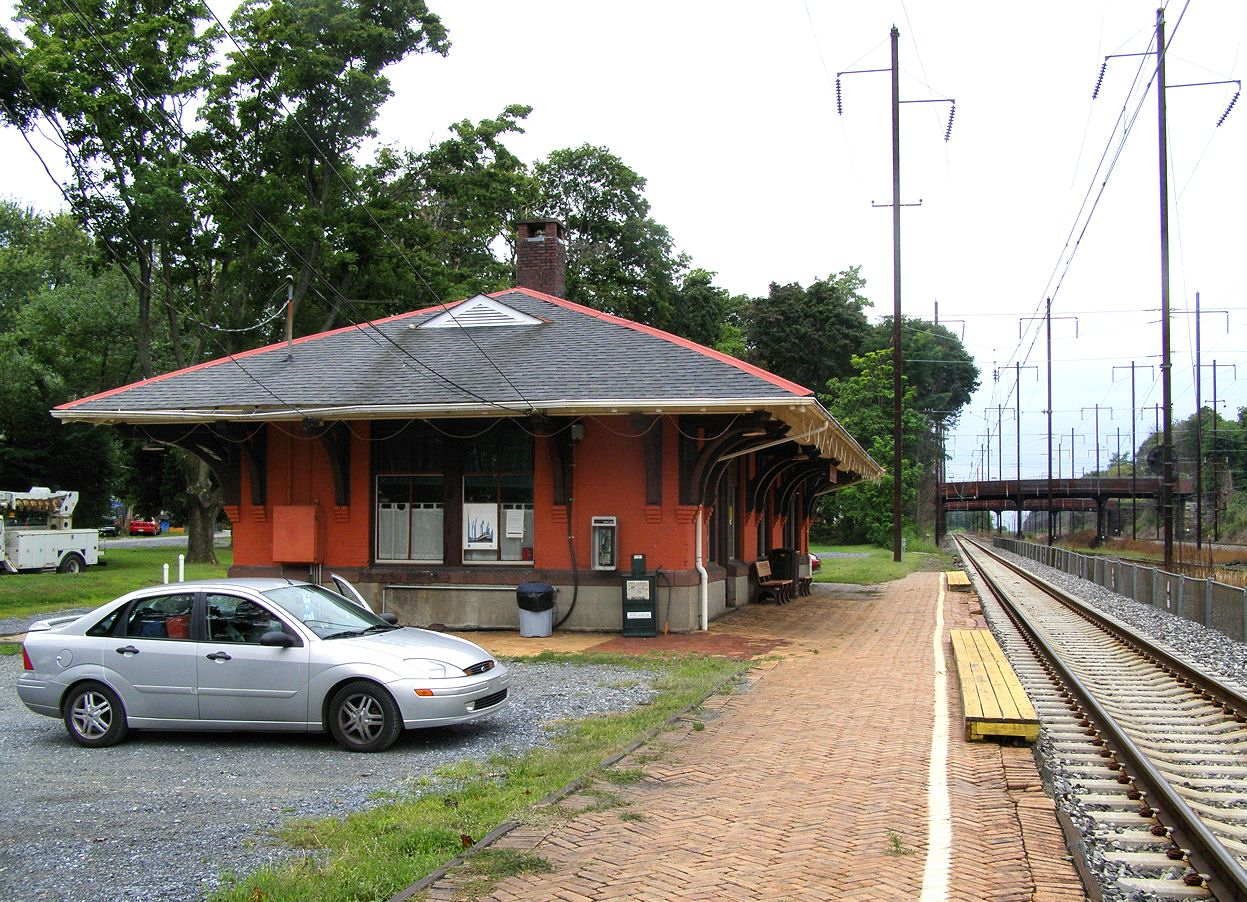
- Parkesburg Amtrak station on the eastbound track 1, but looking west.

General information
- Location: 501 Maple Street; Parkesburg, Pennsylvania; United States
- Coordinates: 39°57′33″N 75°55′20″W
- Owner: Amtrak
- Line: Amtrak Philadelphia to Harrisburg Main Line (Keystone Corridor)
- Platforms: 2 side platforms
- Tracks: 3
- Connections: TMACC: Coatesville Link

Other information
- Station code: Amtrak: PAR

History
- Opened: 1905
- Electrified: January 15, 1938

Passengers
- FY 2025: 27,273 (Amtrak)

Services
Preceding station	Amtrak	Following station
Lancaster toward Harrisburg	Keystone Service	Coatesville toward New York
Pennsylvanian does not stop here
Former services
Preceding station	Amtrak	Following station
Lancaster toward Pittsburgh	Pennsylvanian	Coatesville toward New York
Preceding station	SEPTA	Following station
Terminus	Parkesburg Line	Coatesville toward Suburban Station
Preceding station	Pennsylvania Railroad	Following station
Lenover toward Chicago	Main Line	Pomeroy toward New York or Exchange Place
Location

Parkesburg station is an Amtrak train station located at West First Avenue and South Culvert Street in Parkesburg, Pennsylvania. It is served by most Amtrak Keystone Service trains. A station building exists at the stop, but is not currently used as a ticket office. Parkesburg has two low-level side platforms; a center track is not used for passenger service.

== History ==
From c. 1914 until 1972, Parkesburg Tower was located near the Atlantic Avenue bridge. The tower served as a communication/signalling point for westbound (to Lancaster and beyond) trains, and a routing location for eastbound trains entering the Main Line of the Pennsylvania Railroad. A small service yard was also located nearby for both track service and to assist with sideling switching. Parkesburg station once was the westernmost stop for the SEPTA R5 commuter line from April 2, 1990 (now the Paoli/Thorndale Line). It was truncated to Downingtown November 10, 1996 because of the need for trains to deadhead to Lancaster to turn around. It has since been re-extended to Thorndale, a few miles west of Downingtown.

In 1984, the station appeared in the movie Witness.
