= Whitford station =

Commuter rail station in Chester County, Pennsylvania

Whitford
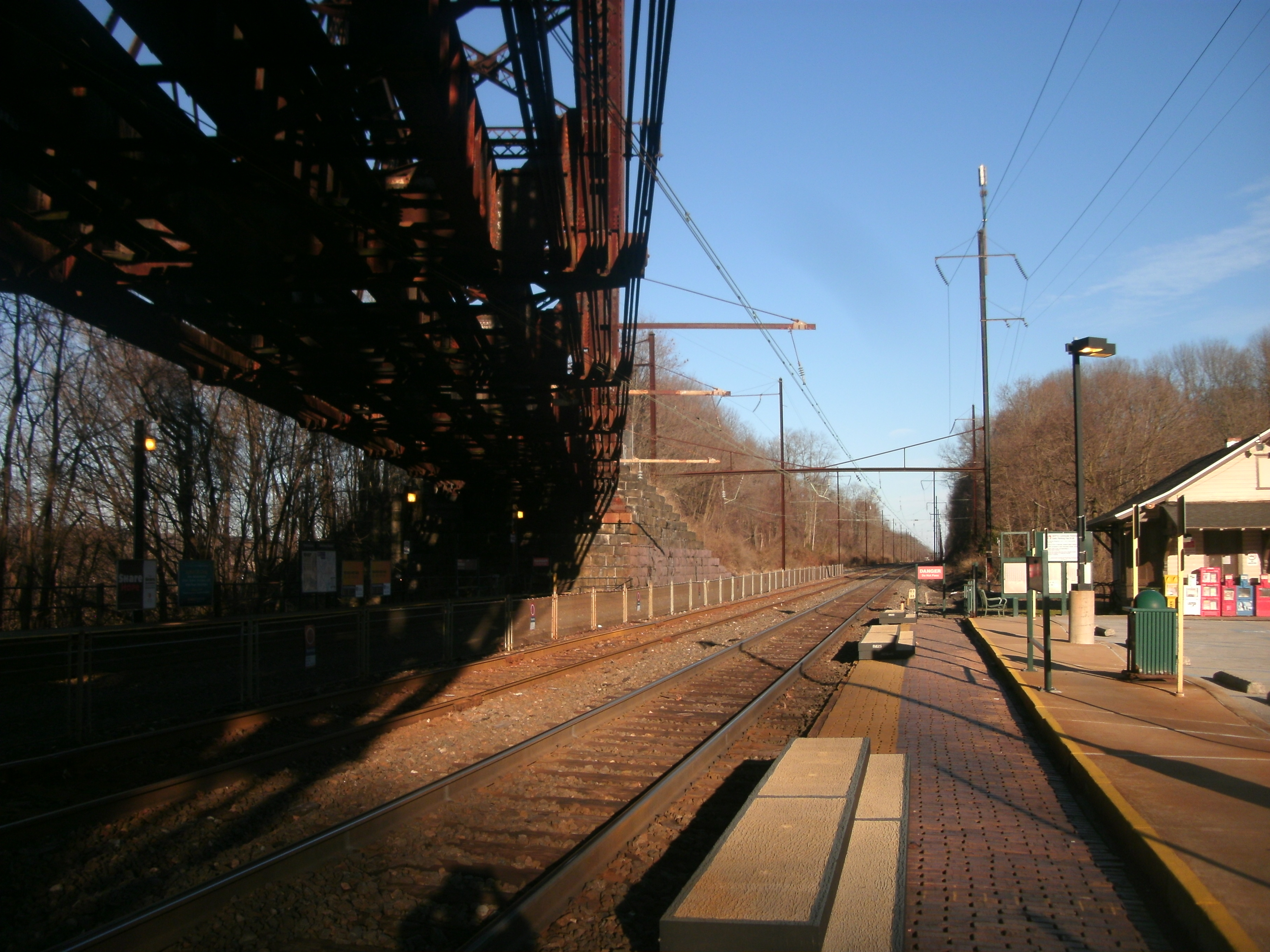
- Whitford station in January 2013

General information
- Location: 1597 South Whitford Road; Exton, Pennsylvania; United States
- Owner: Amtrak
- Operator: SEPTA
- Line: Amtrak Philadelphia to Harrisburg Main Line (Keystone Corridor)
- Platforms: 2 side platforms
- Tracks: 3

Construction
- Parking: 229 spaces (daily)
- Cycle facilities: 2 racks (4 spaces)
- Accessible: No

Other information
- Fare zone: 4

History
- Opened: 1880
- Electrified: January 15, 1938

Passengers
- 2017: 408 boardings 420 alightings (weekday average)
- Rank: 64 of 146

Services
Preceding station	SEPTA	Following station
Downingtown toward Thorndale	Paoli/Thorndale Line	Exton toward Temple University
Former services
Preceding station	Amtrak	Following station
Downingtown toward Harrisburg	Keystone Service Before 1988	Exton toward Philadelphia–Suburban
Preceding station	Pennsylvania Railroad	Following station
Bradford Hills toward Chicago	Main Line	Whiteland toward New York or Exchange Place
- Whitford Railroad Station
- U.S. National Register of Historic Places
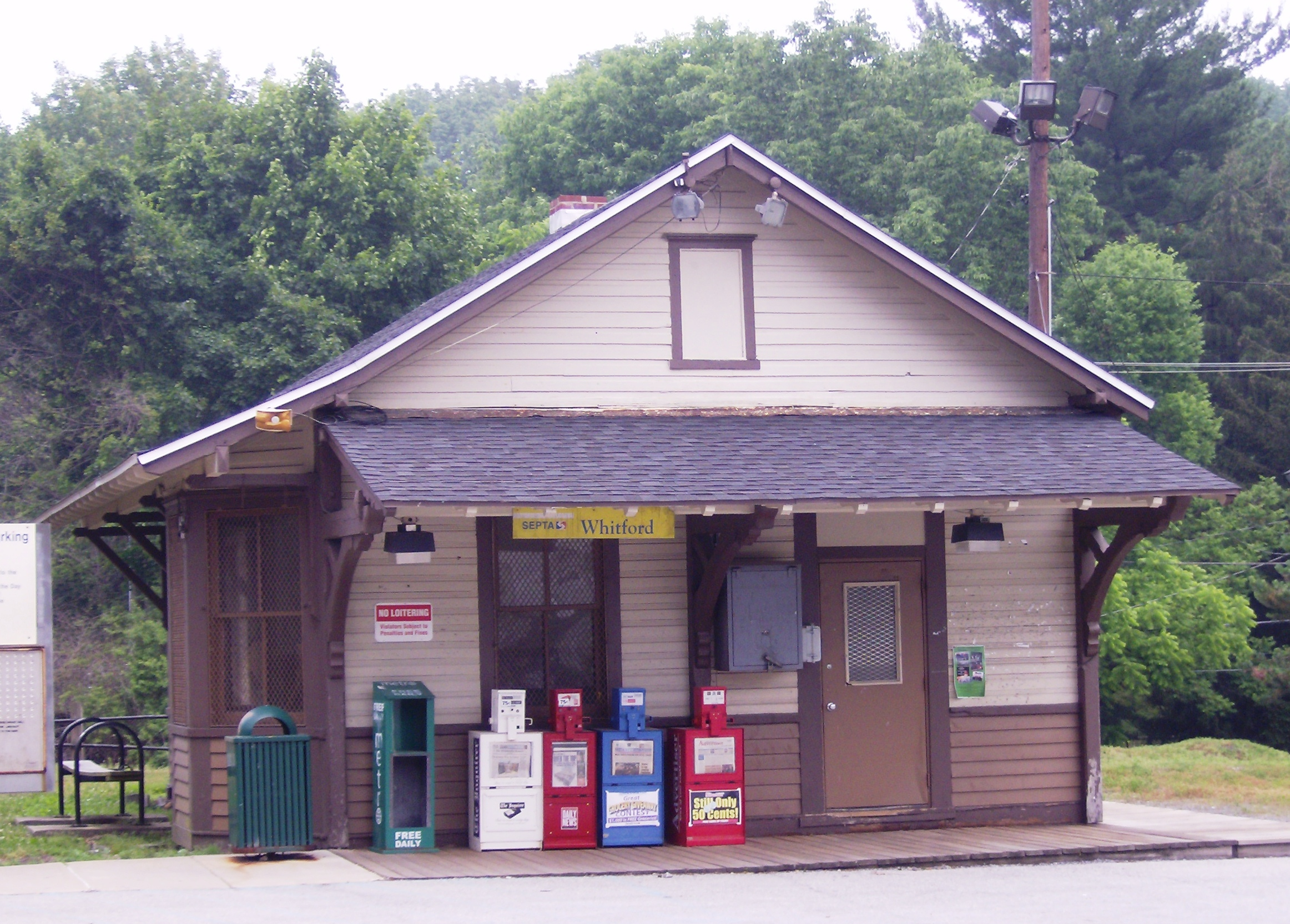
- The NRHP-listed station house
- Interactive map of Whitford Railroad Station
- Location: 405 South Whitford Road; Exton, Pennsylvania
- Coordinates: 40.0147°N 75.6381°W
- Built: 1880
- Architectural style: Clapboard
- NRHP reference No.: 84003324
- Added to NRHP: August 2, 1984
Location

Whitford station is a commuter rail and former intercity passenger rail station located in the western suburbs of Philadelphia at South Whitford Road and Spackman Lane, Exton, Pennsylvania. It is served by most SEPTA Paoli/Thorndale Line trains and until 1998 some of Amtrak's Keystone Service trains.

== Whitford Flyover ==
Whitford station is best known for the abandoned railway bridge that sits directly above the station site. The current station sits along the once-busy former Pennsylvania Railroad (PRR) four-track Main Line, which, in its prime, hosted a constant flow of commuter and long distance trains. To circumvent constant bottlenecks near Philadelphia, the PRR constructed a low-grade double-track electrified line in 1906 to host its freight traffic. This was done to bypass the steep grades and busy Philadelphia suburbs. Known as the Philadelphia and Thorndale Branch, the line ran alongside the current Paoli/Thorndale Line, crossing (or "flying") over it via a massive truss directly above the Whitford station. After the sharp decline in rail traffic in the 1970s, the freight line was abandoned outright by Conrail in 1989. In addition, the current passenger line was reduced from four tracks to three in the 1960s.

In its heyday, the PRR produced a series of calendars that included paintings of scenes throughout the extensive rail system. Artist Grif Teller captured a busy moment at Whitford in his "Main Lines—Freight and Passenger" painting from 1949, when the overhead trestle was still in use.

=== Current station ===
On August 2, 1984, the station house was listed on the National Register of Historic Places. There is no ticket office at the station. There are 229 parking spaces at the station for daily parking, some of which sit on the abandoned freight line that crosses over the station site.

This station is 28.7 track miles from Philadelphia's Suburban Station. In 2017, the average total weekday boardings at this station was 408, and the average total weekday alightings was 420.

== Station layout ==
Whitford has two low-level side platforms. A center track is not used for passenger service.
