= Little Apple =

Little Apple may refer to:

- "Little Apple" (song), 2014 song by Chinese group Chopstick Brothers
- Little Apple Books, publisher
- The Little Apple, nickname of Manhattan, Kansas, United States
- HP Little Apple, Saturn CPU

== See also ==
- Big Apple (disambiguation)
- An Apple a Day (小蘋果), 1970 Hong Kong film starring Lau Dan
