= The Big Apple (Waitomo) =

Tourist attraction in Waitomo, New Zealand

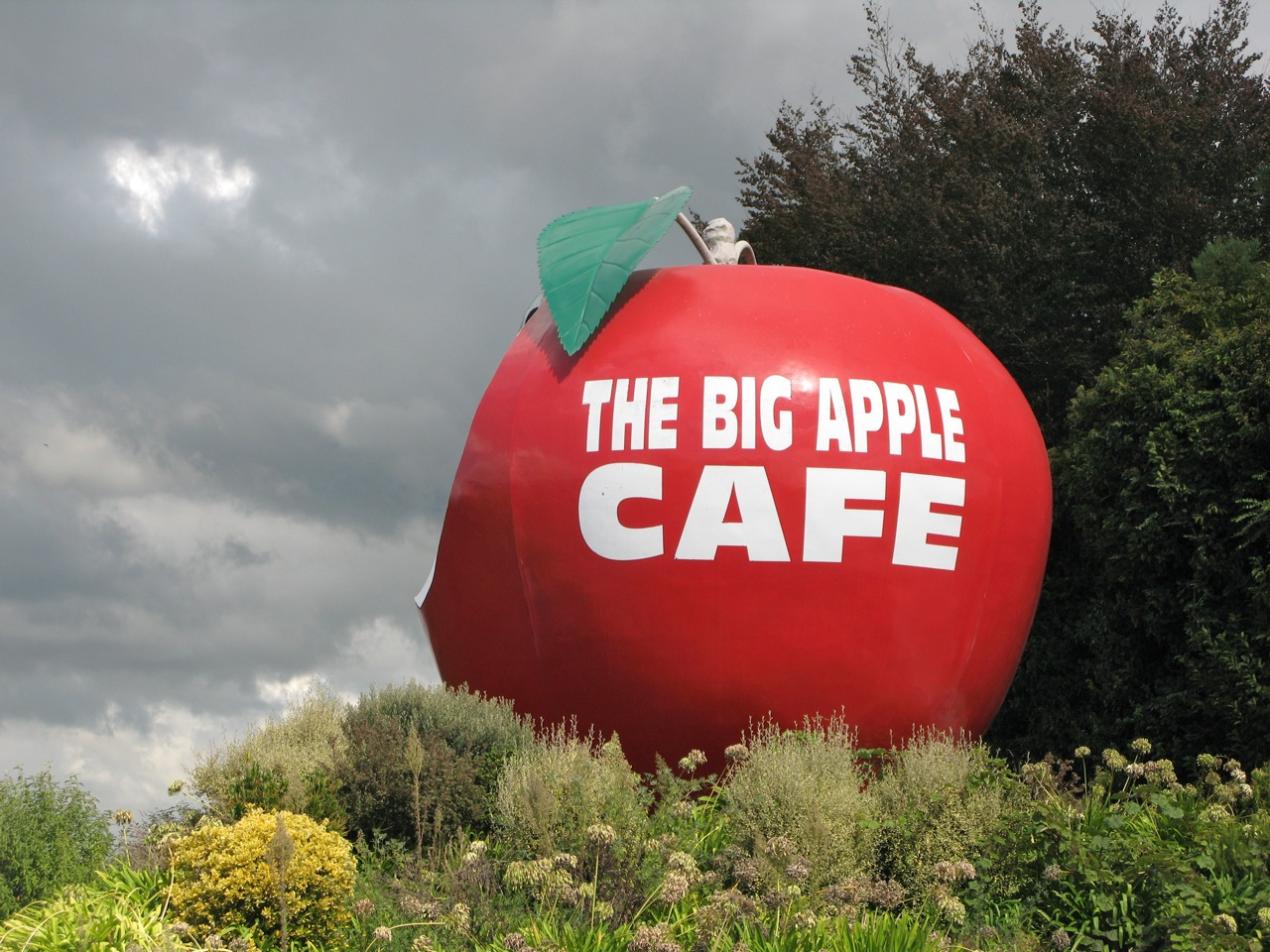
- The Big Apple in 2011
- Dimensions: 7.5 m (25 ft)
- Location: Waitomo, New Zealand
- 38.2444°S 175.1826°E

The Big Apple is a large statue of an apple in Waitomo, New Zealand. It is 7.5 metres (25 ft) tall, and located between Ōtorohanga and Te Kūiti on State Highway 3. It also includes a restaurant, café, and conference facility. It is near a 1,920-square-metre (20,700 sq ft) orchard, and has four dining areas with a capacity of 500 people. As of 2009, it attracted tourists in numbers of "thousands a week." It is one of New Zealand's big things.

== History ==
Pieter and Betsy van Straalen purchased the orchard in 1963 and opened the Big Apple restaurant in 1995. The business was bought by their eldest son Arnold and his wife in 2003, who started a souvenir shop and converted a 1920s villa into a function venue that can hold 60 people. In 2009 they listed the business for sale for $3.9 million, saying that they wanted to experience tourism as tourists rather than business owners. In 2001 Arnold became chairman of an entity that promotes tourism to the Waitomo Caves, Destination Waitomo.

In 2013 people queued at The Big Apple to make themselves be heard on proposed changes by the New Zealand Transport Agency on an intersection that was the site of two deaths of North American tourists in two accidents in 2012.

In 2015 Tourism Holdings bought the Big Apple with the intention of it becoming a "high-class" tourist attraction. Tourism Holdings said that they would refurbish the retail space, and the interior of the conference facility which would include a new bar, new seating, and new flooring. It was expected to close on 30 September for these renovations and open again in December.

== See also ==
- Peachoid
- Big Apple (Colborne, Ontario)
