= Central of Georgia K class =

Class of locomotive

Central of Georgia K class ("Big Apple")
Type and origin
- Power type: Steam
- Builder: Lima Locomotive Works
- Serial number: 8254–8261
- Build date: October 1943
- Total produced: 8
Specifications
- Configuration
  - Whyte: 4-8-4
  - UIC: 2′D2′ h2
- Gauge: 4 ft 8 1/2 in (1,435 mm)
- Driver dia.: 73.5 in (1.867 m)
- Adhesive weight: 260,000 lb (120 t)
- Loco weight: 447,400 lb (202.9 t)
- Boiler pressure: 250 psi (1.72 MPa)
- Cylinders: Two, outside
- Cylinder size: 27 in × 30 in (686 mm × 762 mm)
Performance figures
- Tractive effort: 63,200 lbf (281.13 kN), 74,710 lbf (332.33 kN) with booster
Career
- Operators: Central of Georgia Railway
- Class: K
- Numbers: 451–458
- Nicknames: Big Apples
- Retired: 1953
- Disposition: All scrapped

The Central of Georgia Railway (CofG) K class (known as the "Big Apples") were a class of 4-8-4 steam locomotives produced by Lima Locomotive Works for the CofG during World War II.

The Central of Georgia Railway (CofG), like most other railroads, were in need of motive power during World War II. Freight and passenger traffic soared to new heights. Part of the wartime traffic consisted of "mains" as troop trains headed to and from the numerous military bases located on the line, namely Fort Benning, near Columbus, Georgia. The CofG had freight and passenger power that had been overhauled into tip top shape. However, it left it wear and tear on the existing steam engines. The Central decided they needed a new locomotive to replace their 4-8-2s in existing service handling trains like the Seminole and the Flamingo were brought in from the Illinois Central Railroad and the Louisville and Nashville Railroad, respectively from Birmingham, Alabama. They decided that the class M Mountain could not handle those trains unassisted to Albany, Georgia.

The answer to this problem was answered by the Lima Locomotive Works in October 1943, when they delivered eight new dual service 4-8-4 locomotives. The engines were nicknamed "Big Apples" by engine crews on the western end of the railroad. Locomotive numbers were 451–458. Because of the War Production Board's restriction on designing new engines, they were patterned after the Southern Pacific GS-2 type 4-8-4s.

It was noted in the 1944 Railway Mechanical Engineers that fuel performance for the CofG K class 4-8-4s was well under 100 lb of coal per 1,000 gross ton miles and averaged 11.4 lb per passenger-train car mile in service

The "Big Apples" operated in passenger and freight service from Albany, Georgia to both Birmingham, Alabama and Atlanta, Georgia. They could handle 1,500 tons between Birmingham and Columbus, Georgia, unassisted and 2,350 tons from Macon, Georgia to Americus, Georgia. It is also believed that they could handle as many as 17 passenger cars on the Seminole and the Flamingo.

They lasted in service for 10 years. In 1953, they were withdrawn from service and were scrapped later that year. No. 451 remained in storage in Macon, Georgia until 1959 when it was scrapped after the railroad failed to find a city or an institution to accept it as a display piece.
