= Keystone Service =

Amtrak service in Pennsylvania

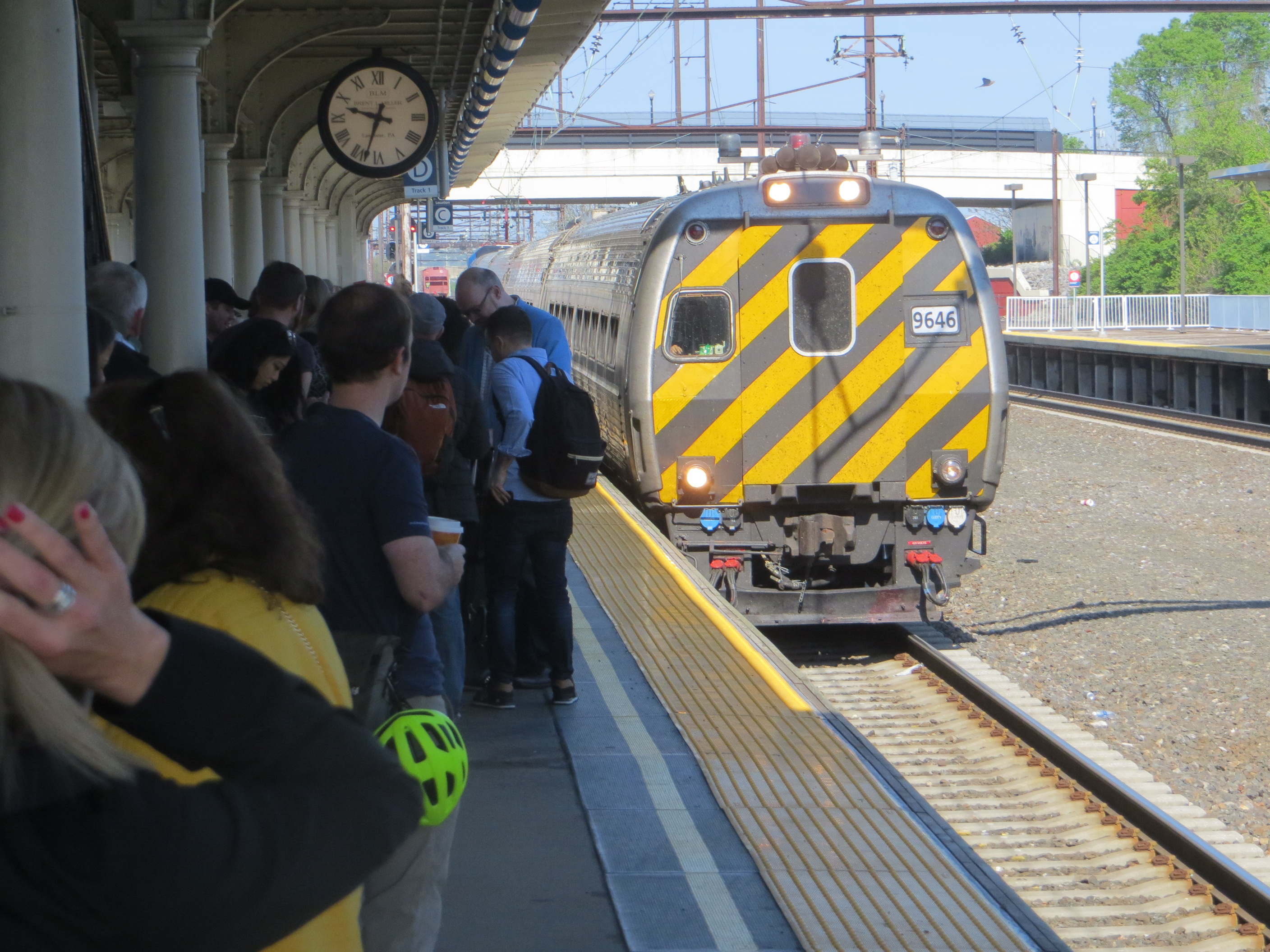
- A Keystone Service train at Lancaster station in Lancaster, Pennsylvania in 2018

Overview
- Service type: Inter-city rail, higher-speed rail
- Locale: Northeastern United States
- Predecessor: Penn Central corridor trains
- First service: October 29, 1972
- Current operator: Amtrak in partnership with PennDOT
- Annual ridership: 1,330,349 (FY 25) ▲3.6% (Note: Amtrak's Fiscal Year (FY) runs from October 1 of the prior year to September 30 of the named year.)

Route
- Termini: Philadelphia, Pennsylvania or New York City, New York; Harrisburg, Pennsylvania
- Stops: 19
- Distance travelled: 195 miles (314 km)
- Average journey time: 3 hours, 30 minutes (New York–Harrisburg); 1 hour, 45 minutes (Philadelphia–Harrisburg)
- Service frequency: 13 daily round trips
- Train number: 600–601, 605, 607, 609–612, 615, 618–620, 622, 637, 639–656, 658, 660–667, 669–672, 674

On-board services
- Class: Coach Class

Technical
- Rolling stock: Amfleet coaches Metroliner cab car Siemens ACS-64 locomotives
- Electrification: Overhead line, 12 kV 25 Hz AC
- Operating speed: 56 mph (90 km/h) (avg.); 110 mph (180 km/h) (top, Keystone Corridor); 125 mph (200 km/h) (top, Northeast Corridor)

The Keystone Service is a 195-mile (314 km) regional passenger train service from Amtrak, that operates between the Harrisburg Transportation Center in Harrisburg, Pennsylvania, and 30th Street Station in Philadelphia, running along the Philadelphia to Harrisburg Main Line (known as the Keystone Corridor). Most trains also operate along the Northeast Corridor (NEC) between Philadelphia and Penn Station in New York City.

Trips between Harrisburg and New York take approximately 3 1/2 hours, including 1 3/4 hours between Harrisburg and Philadelphia. There are also several express services that can cut the journey times of both by approximately 15 minutes.

The line is considered higher-speed rail with trains operating at up to 125 miles per hour (200 km/h) over parts of the Northeast Corridor and up to 110 mph (180 km/h) over parts of the Keystone Corridor.

As of 2024 it is Amtrak's fifth-busiest route nationally, and the third-busiest among services in the greater Northeast Corridor, carrying 1.27 million passengers, an increase of 13.7% over FY2023. Total revenue in FY2016 was $41,123,787, an increase of 7.5% over FY2015. The route is primarily funded by the Pennsylvania Department of Transportation (PennDOT).

== History ==
=== Takeover from Penn Central ===
The Keystone Service is the successor to numerous services running along the Philadelphia to Harrisburg Main Line dating back to 1857, when the Pennsylvania Railroad (PRR) bought the Philadelphia and Columbia Railroad, enabling service between Philadelphia and Harrisburg.

By the time the PRR merged with Penn Central in 1968, it operated three types of service on the Main Line: commuter service between the suburb of Paoli and Suburban Station via 30th Street Station, regional service (trains numbered in the 600s) between Harrisburg and Suburban Station via 30th Street Station, and express intercity service like the Broadway Limited and Duquesne, which skipped 30th Street Station entirely and used North Philadelphia station as their only Philadelphia stop.

When the Metroliner high-speed program had begun two years earlier, the state had attempted to capitalize on the opportunity to purchase upgraded rolling stock for the 600-series trains. On August 30, 1966, Governor William Scranton of Pennsylvania announced plans to purchase 11 Metroliners capable of 80 mph (130 km/h) service to replace the Silverliners then used. The cars were ordered through Philadelphia commuter agency SEPTA, as the state was not permitted to contract directly with the PRR. The state, SEPTA, and PRR reached an agreement on November 3; the state and SEPTA would each pay $2 million, funded mostly by mass transit grants from the newly formed Department of Housing and Urban Development (HUD), and the PRR would receive a free 15-year lease of the cars. The PRR soon withdrew after complaints from competing Red Arrow Lines and Capitol Trailways, and the HUD grants were later found to be inapplicable to intercity service.

In June 1968, an agreement was reached where the state Transportation Assistance Authority would pay $2 million and Penn Central would pay $2.5 million for the 11 Metroliners for Harrisburg service. On July 14, a 4-car train was tested on the line, with several demonstration runs for officials on August 21. On February 25, 1970, the cars intended for Harrisburg service completed their performance testing. Penn Central refused to accept the cars, citing numerous technical issues with the cars and their general unsuitability for the service. They had slower acceleration than the Silverliners already in service, tended to overheat when making numerous closely spaced stops, and had difficulty climbing the grade out of Suburban Station. Additionally, the corridor lacked high-level platforms to effectively use the cars, and 15 substations would require expensive modifications. The 11 cars were unused for some time before Penn Central ultimately decided to lease the cars for use on the core New York–Washington service. They were moved back to the Budd plant for modifications in April. In July 1970, the state authorized $100,000 to upgrade existing Silverliners for the Harrisburg service instead.

When Amtrak was created to take over intercity passenger rail service in 1971, there was substantial debate about whether some trains constituted intercity services (to be either taken over by Amtrak or discontinued, relieving private companies like Penn Central of the financial burden) or commuter services (to be retained by the private companies unless discontinuance was approved by the ICC). Penn Central alleged that several of its regional services – the 600-series trains, connecting Lancaster–York buses, Clockers, and New York–Chatham service – were intercity services that could be discontinued since they were not included in Amtrak's initial system.

On March 31, 1971, Penn Central filed with ICC to discontinue the 600-series trains at the conclusion of their contract with SEPTA on June 30. The state filed suit against Penn Central on April 7 to stop the discontinuance. On April 23, Penn Central filed in District Court to discontinue the regional services. Five days later, the state and the UTU filed an opposing suit, calling the trains a commuter service. On April 30, Judge John P. Fullam ordered Penn Central to continue operating the trains and ultimately referred the case to the ICC.

When Amtrak took over intercity service on May 1, 1971, the 600-series trains continued to be operated by Penn Central, though they were listed in Amtrak schedules. The city of Philadelphia and the state both preferred to have Penn Central rather than Amtrak operate the service, as Amtrak was exempt from state control. On June 21, the ICC ruled that the service was not intercity rail, as sought by the state and not by Penn Central. On August 3, Fullam ordered Penn Central to continue operating the regional services.

On October 29, 1972, after further negotiations with Penn Central, Amtrak took over operation of the 600-series trains as Silverliner Service, named for the Silverliner cars used to run the trains. Amtrak assumed formal responsibility for the Silverliner Service and Clockers around April 1974. Penn Central (and later Conrail and finally SEPTA Regional Rail) continued to operate Paoli–Philadelphia commuter service. Amtrak took over ticketing for the Silverliner Service and Clockers from Penn Central on July 1, 1975. On October 26, 1975, SEPTA funded an increase from 9 to 11 daily round trips. Amtrak began including a listing of connecting trains to/from New York City in the November 1975 timetable.

=== Declining service ===
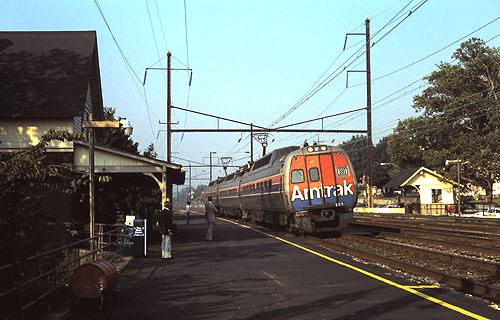
A Keystone Service train of Metroliners at Downingtown in 1985

In the late 1970s, NJDOT's new Arrow III railcars arrived several years ahead of the completion of electrification projects to allow their use in New Jersey commuter service. By this time, Amtrak was desperate for electric propulsion, as the aging GG1 locomotives were nearing the end of their usefulness, replacement E60 locomotives were proving unreliable, and new EMD AEM-7 locomotives were only just beginning to arrive. In April 1978, Amtrak leased 70 of NJDOT's Arrow II cars for use on the Clockers, Keystone Service, and the new Chesapeake. By January 1979, the Arrows were rotated between the Clockers and Silverliner Service. The Arrows had bathrooms and water fountains, making them more suitable for regional service than the Silverliners. In late 1980, under pressure from NJDOT, Amtrak returned all but 32 of the Arrows, which quickly created the need to find other rolling stock for the Silverliner Service. Despite being pronounced unsuitable for Harrisburg service a decade before, the Metroliners were the only easily available rolling stock, as they were being slowly retired from the eponymous service. A test run with Metroliners was made on January 20, 1981, and Metroliners were used in revenue service for two weeks in February. Metroliners were used on the New York – Harrisburg Valley Forge for a week in August, and a maintenance facility at Harrisburg opened on October 13, 1981.

As the new AEM-7 locomotives continued to arrive, Amtrak assigned them to haul crack Metroliner trains with Amfleet consists, and reassigned the less-reliable Metroliners for the secondary Philadelphia–Harrisburg service, dubbing them Capitoliners. On October 25, 1981, the service was rebranded as Keystone Service. All service was then operated by the Metroliners, which lacked the quick acceleration of the Silverliners or Arrows, making them unsuitable for the service. After a single Metroliner set was withdrawn from Clocker service in March 1982, the Keystone Service was the only remaining use of the Metroliners. On April 24, 1983, a pair of weekday trains – the 9:54 am arrival and 3:55 pm departure from Suburban Station – were renamed Keystone Executive. Intended to attract riders from the western end of the corridor, the trains made intermediate stops only at Lancaster, Downingtown, and 30th Street, with a 99-minute schedule.

The first westbound train of the morning made numerous local stops for commuters to Harrisburg, including some at stations not served by any other Amtrak train. This was first shown in the April 29, 1973, schedule. These one-off stops were gradually dropped: Merion in 1979; 52nd Street and Berwyn in 1980; Radnor and Narberth in 1982; and Bryn Mawr, Overbrook, and Wayne in 1987. Amtrak and SEPTA opened a station in Exton on November 2, 1981, to serve fast-growing suburban areas.

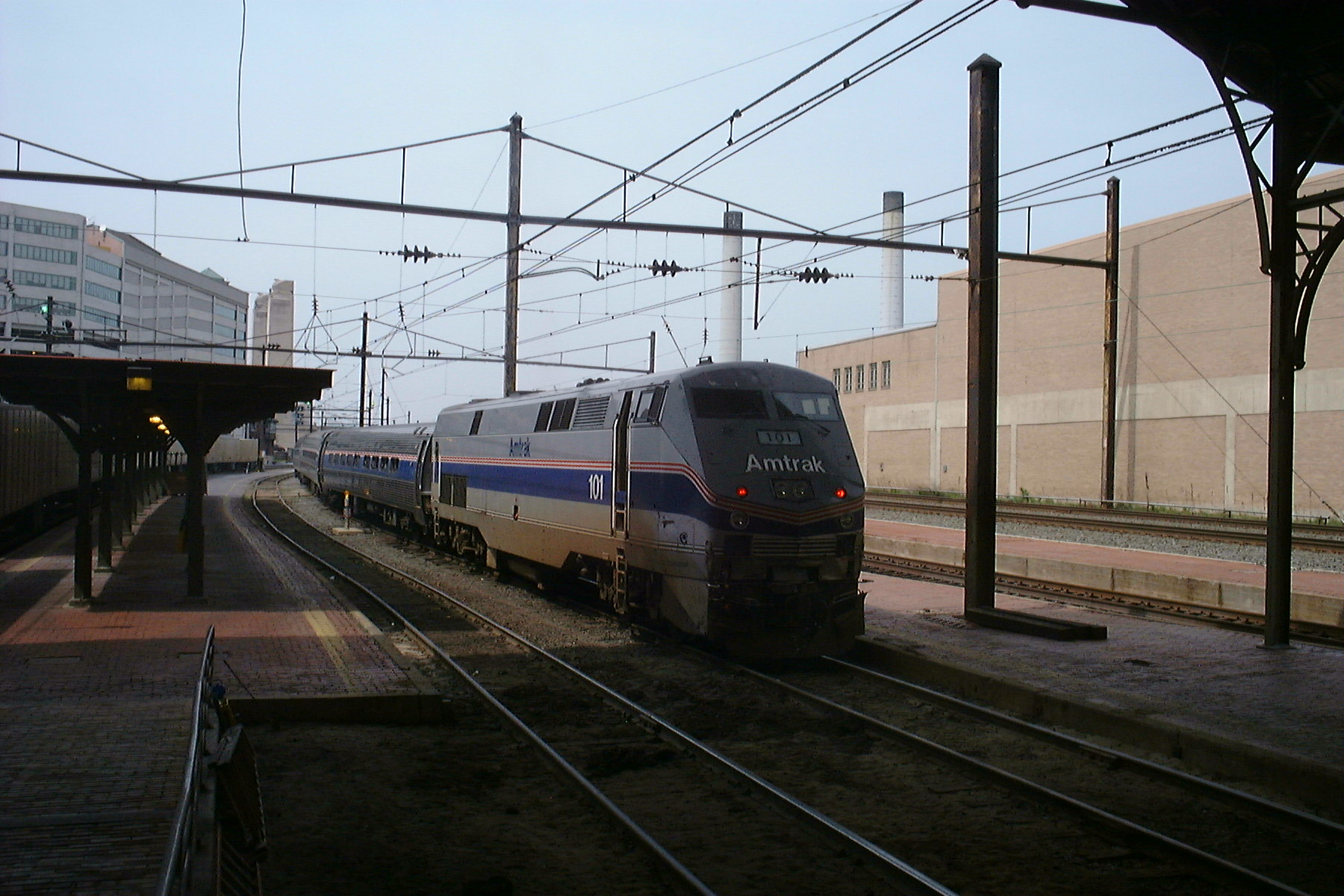
Diesel-powered Keystone Service train at Harrisburg in 2002

The Silverliner Service carried over one million passengers in 1980, but ridership was in steep decline due to a variety of factors. On October 30, 1983, Amtrak reduced the service from 11 to 9 weekday round trips, prompting an 8% drop in ridership. A decrease to 6 weekday round trips on January 12, 1986, and 5 round trips on April 27, cut ridership by an additional 45%. The cuts included the termination of the Keystone Executive. Despite the loss of service, fares doubled from 1980 to 1987. The single SEPTA round trip past Paoli to Downingtown was cut in 1983, but two round trips were restored in March 1985, with additional midday and weekend service added in 1988. Service was further extended to Parkesburg in 1990, with lower fares than Amtrak. By 1990, SEPTA carried 595,000 passengers west of Paoli, twice that of Amtrak's ridership on the entire Keystone Service.

The Metroliner cars, worn out from nearly two decades of heavy use, began to fail frequently. In April 1985, Amtrak began studying the possibility of removing electrification west of Paoli. On-time performance decreased from around 85% in 1985 to below 60% in early 1988. On January 25, 1988, Amtrak began towing the Metroliner cars with AEM-7 locomotives rather than running them under their own power, although the cars had their pantographs up to power lighting and heating systems. A wreck of the Night Owl four days later took two AEM-7 locomotives out of commission, exacerbating a shortage of electric power available to Amtrak. On February 1, Amtrak converted all Keystone Service trains to diesel power and terminated them on the lower level of 30th Street Station, as diesel-powered trains were not allowed in the tunnels to Suburban Station. The change was listed as "temporary" on timetables starting on May 15, 1988, and lasting into 1990. After dieselization and the lengthening of schedules, on-time performance began to consistently exceed 90%.

=== Through service ===
At its inception on May 1, 1971, Amtrak ran two through services on the line: the combined New York–Chicago Broadway Limited and New York–St. Louis Spirit of St. Louis (soon renamed National Limited), and the Pittsburgh–New York Duquesne (soon renamed Keystone). The former train stopped only at Lancaster and Paoli between Harrisburg and North Philadelphia; it was intended for long-distance travelers between the East Coast and the Midwest rather than local passengers. The Duquesne/Keystone had one additional stop at Coatesville and was intended for medium-distance intercity travel.

Amtrak discontinued the Keystone on April 30, 1972, leaving the 600-series trains as the only local service along their route. The Broadway Limited and National Limited were split; they added local stops west of Harrisburg, but passengers from between Harrisburg and Philadelphia had to change trains at Harrisburg, Lancaster, Paoli, or Philadelphia to reach stops west of Harrisburg or north of Philadelphia.

On October 28, 1973, Amtrak changed the weekday-only Valley Forge from a Philadelphia–New Haven local train to a Harrisburg–New York City train. It only made the same intermediate stops as the Keystone, including no direct service to 30th Street Station. However, its introduction meant that through passengers no longer had to change at Philadelphia or rely on the Broadway Limited, whose on-time performance had plunged to just 6.8% in 1973.

Additional local stops in Pennsylvania were later added. On May 19, 1974, Amtrak added weekend service on the Valley Forge: a Saturday train from Harrisburg to Boston, and a Sunday train from Boston to Harrisburg. The weekend service ended on October 26, 1975. On October 28, 1979, Amtrak and SEPTA began the "Ardmore Connection": the Valley Forge began stopping at Ardmore, where a close connection could be made with a SEPTA Paoli–Philadelphia local train. On December 17, 1979, the westbound Valley Forge began stopping at 30th Street rather than bypassing it using the Pittsburgh Subway; however, it retained the Ardmore stop.

The Washington sections of the Broadway Limited and National Limited originally split at Harrisburg and reached the Northeast Corridor via the Port Road Branch. The Washington section of the Broadway Limited was rerouted through Philadelphia on October 26, 1975; the National Limited followed suit on October 29, 1978. The National Limited was discontinued entirely on October 1, 1979; the state began funding the Pittsburgh–Philadelphia Pennsylvanian as a replacement on April 27, 1980.

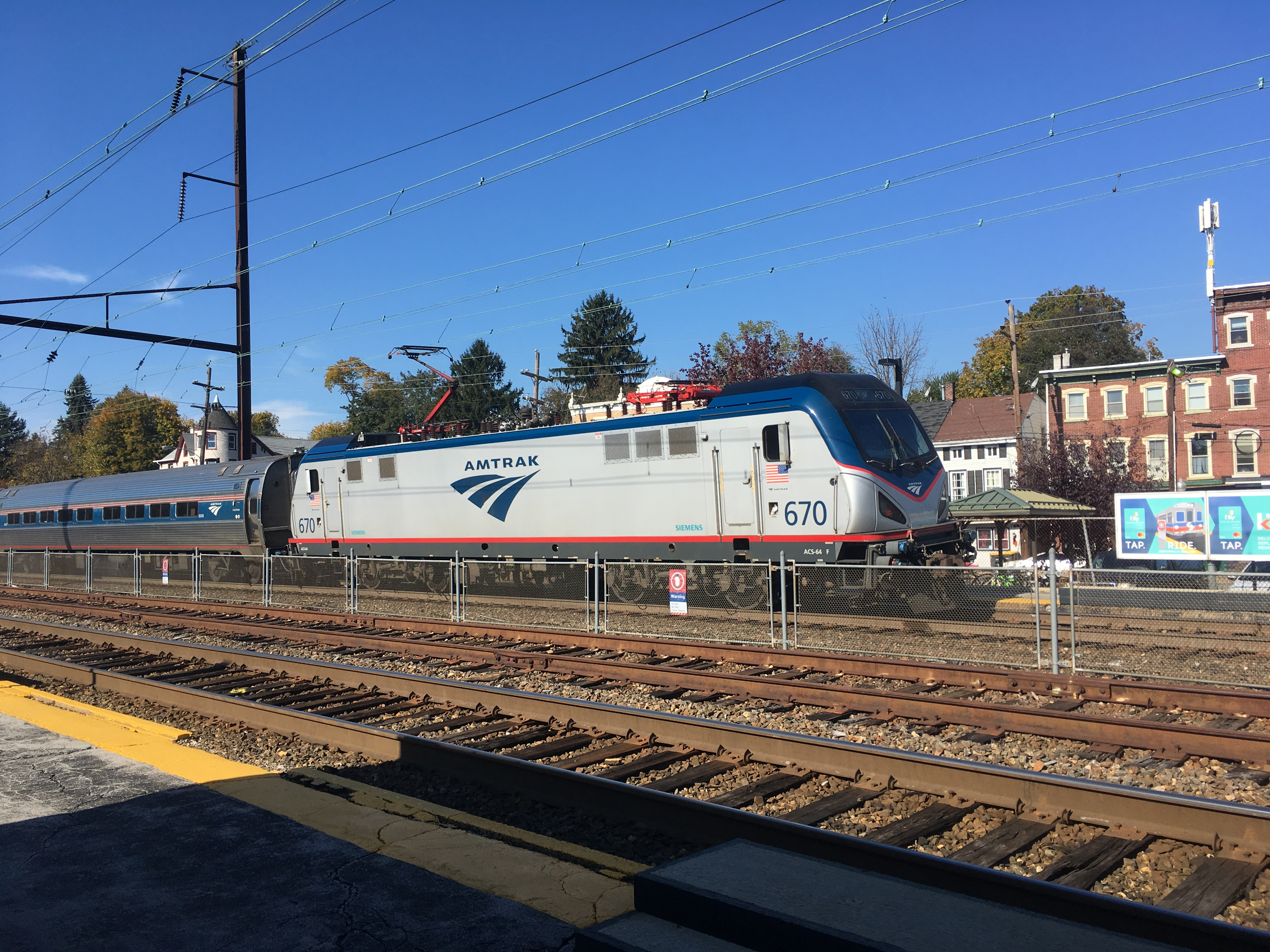
Harrisburg-bound Keystone Service train at Downingtown in 2018, with locomotive at the rear of the train

At the same time, a pair of Clockers, the westbound Keystone and eastbound Big Apple, were extended to Harrisburg on weekends. They ran within an hour of the Valley Forge's weekday schedule; however, they ran to 30th Street and Suburban stations rather than only serving North Philadelphia. The Keystone was renamed Susquehanna on October 25, 1981. The Big Apple and Susquehanna dropped the Suburban Station stop a year later, but continued to serve 30th Street. On October 30, 1983, the Pennsylvanian was extended to New York City, eliminating the transfer at Philadelphia (although it continued to stop at 30th Street). On January 12, 1986, the eastbound Valley Forge began serving 30th Street (as the westbound had for six years); this allowed it to effectively replace a canceled Keystone Service train (#600, the first morning eastbound) to serve commuters.

Amtrak began operating the Atlantic City–Philadelphia Atlantic City Express in 1989, and later extended it along several busy corridors in hopes of increasing ridership. On April 4, 1991, one daily Keystone Service round trip was extended to Atlantic City under the Atlantic City Express brand. Only a weekend round trip continued to be through-routed. The Atlantic City Express was discontinued on April 2, 1995; New Jersey Transit Atlantic City Line trains continue to serve 30th Street Station.

=== Modern improvements ===
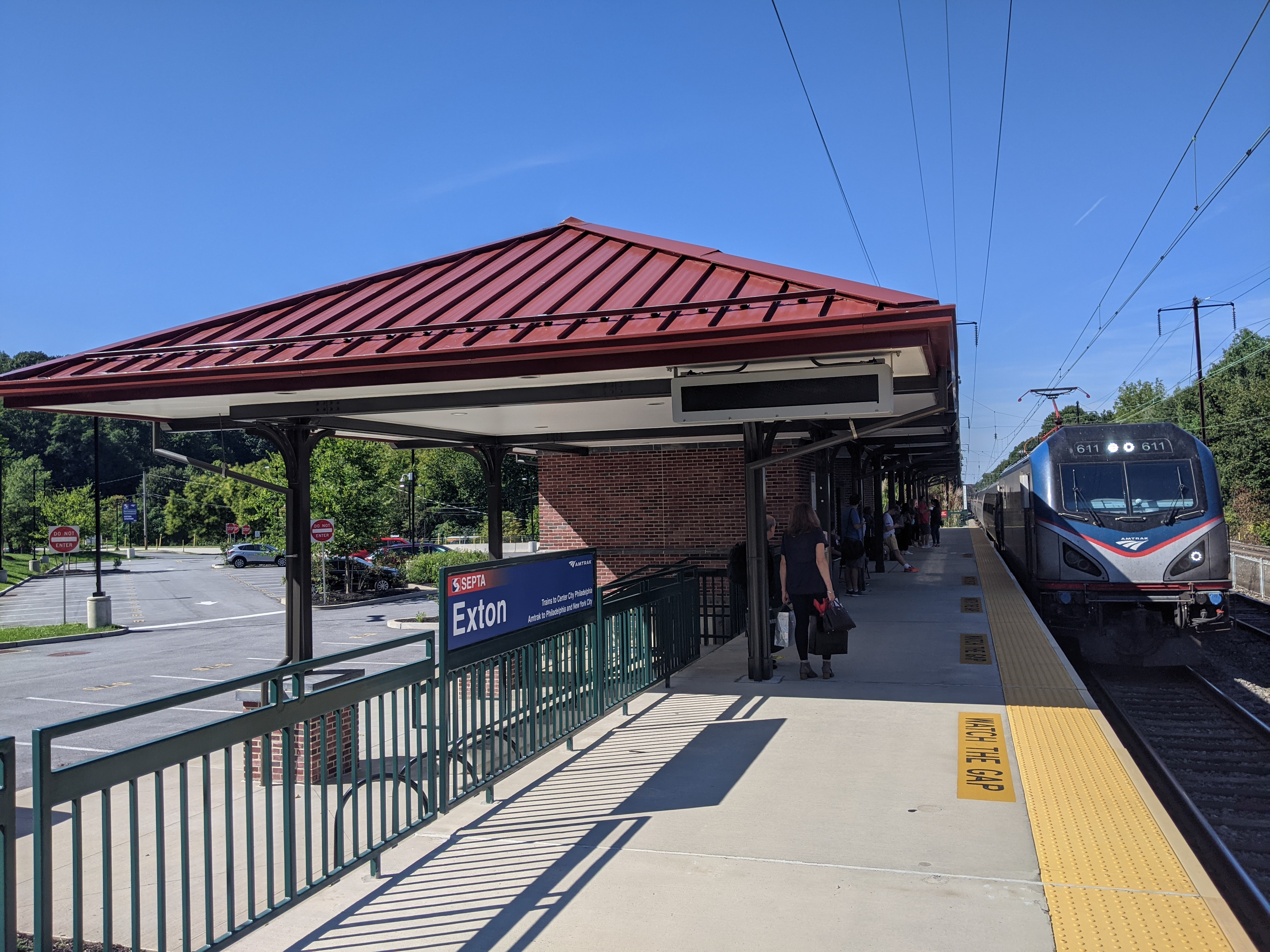
An eastbound Keystone Service train arriving at the rebuilt Exton station in 2021

In November 1996, as part of a general cutback of Regional Rail service, SEPTA cut service back to Downingtown, leaving Parkesburg and Coatesville as Amtrak-only stations. Amtrak added the stations to several existing round trips as a result. Amtrak discontinued its stops at Whitford and Malvern (both served only by a single round trip) on April 5, 1998, reducing the number of suburban stations shared by SEPTA and Keystone Service trains to four.

Beginning in 2000, Amtrak and PennDOT spent $166 million to rehabilitate the Philadelphia to Harrisburg Main Line. This included the restoration of fully electrified service, as well as track improvements for a top speed of 110 miles per hour (180 km/h). When the project was completed and electric service began in October 2006, travel times between Harrisburg and Philadelphia were reduced from 120 minutes to 95 minutes, with further time savings for through trains by eliminating the need for an engine change at Philadelphia. Service was also increased from 11 to 14 daily round trips. By FY 2010, ridership was up 91% since FY 2000 and 58% since FY 2006.

Later improvements aimed to develop a sealed corridor without public at-grade crossings, which would allow future speed increases to 125 miles per hour (201 km/h) west of Philadelphia. The last two such at-grade crossings on the line, located just east of Mount Joy, were closed on September 24, 2014. They were replaced with a bridge connecting to a nearby street. However, private crossings continued to be used on the line. One private crossing east of Mount Joy was closed soon after a train collided with a tractor using the crossing. Today, only one private crossing remains on the line, west of Lancaster on a private roadway leading to a substation.

On March 18, 2020, Amtrak temporarily suspended all Keystone Service trains due to declining demand because of the ongoing COVID-19 pandemic. Service between Philadelphia and Harrisburg resumed on June 1, 2020, with all-reserved seating. On July 6, 2020, Amtrak restored one Keystone Service train in each direction running the full route between New York City and Harrisburg. Amtrak restored full service between Philadelphia and Harrisburg on September 8, 2020. On January 4, 2021, Amtrak reduced service levels along the Keystone Service due to decreased ridership caused by the COVID-19 pandemic. With the reduction in service, the Keystone Service had seven roundtrips on weekdays and six roundtrips on weekends between Philadelphia and Harrisburg, with three daily roundtrips running the full route between New York City and Harrisburg. Most pre-pandemic service was restored on April 25, 2022, with eleven weekday Philadelphia–Harrisburg round trips.

From March to November 2024, midday Keystone Service trains were replaced with buses west of Lancaster to allow for track work. Service between New York and Philadelphia was reduced to five daily round trips from February 14 to March 15, 2026, to allow one track from the Portal Bridge to be cut over to the new Portal North Bridge.

=== Proposed expansion ===
Proposals for an infill station in Paradise Township have been under considerations since the 1990s. The stop would be about halfway between Lancaster and Parkesburg, serving the local Plain community and allowing tourists to transfer to the Strasburg Rail Road. A July 2004 plan was rejected by the Federal Railroad Administration over concerns that the curved track would preclude ADA-compliant boarding platforms.

== Operation ==
=== Equipment ===
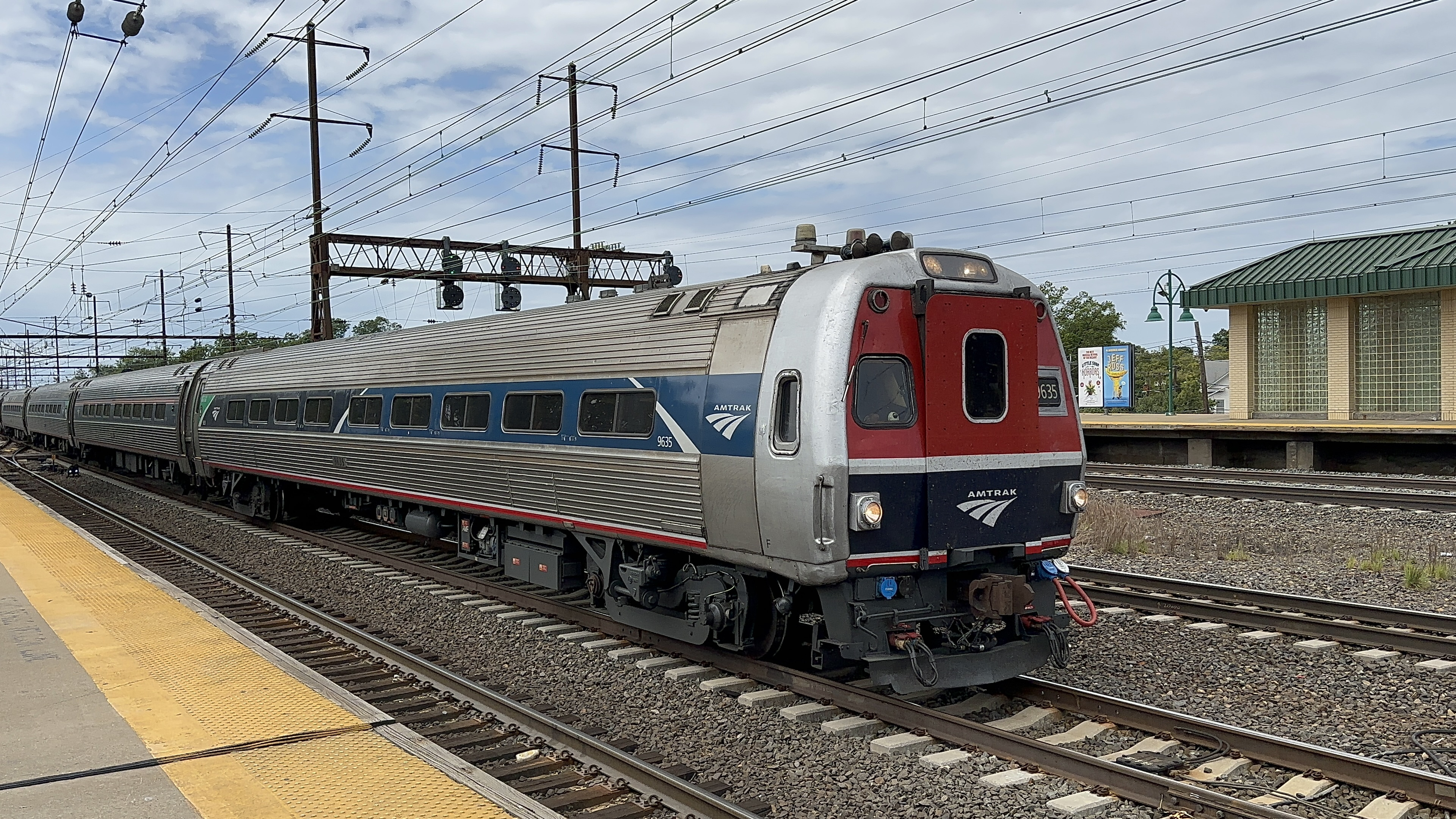
A Keystone Service train being led by a Metroliner cab car at Rahway, New Jersey, in 2025

Keystone Service trains consist of push–pull sets of Amfleet I coaches with a Metroliner cab car and a Siemens ACS-64 electric locomotive. The service offers a single class of service (coach class) with 2×2 seating. Service is unreserved between Harrisburg and Philadelphia and reserved east of Philadelphia to New York. Unlike most Amtrak routes, Keystone Service trains do not offer onboard food service.

By 2031, the train's existing equipment is expected to be replaced by Amtrak Airo trainsets, Amtrak's branding for trainsets combining Siemens Venture passenger cars with a Siemens Charger diesel-electric locomotive. The trainsets for the Keystone Service will include six passenger cars with a food service area and a mix of 2×2 Coach Class and 1×2 Business Class seating. The car nearest the locomotive will be an "Auxiliary Power Vehicle" (APV) equipped with a pantograph to draw power from overhead lines and supply electricity to four electric traction motors in the APV and four in the locomotive.

=== Route ===
Map of the Keystone Service route

The Keystone Service operates entirely over Amtrak-owned trackage:

- Amtrak Philadelphia to Harrisburg Main Line, Harrisburg–Philadelphia
- Amtrak Northeast Corridor, Philadelphia–New York

Trains operate at speeds up to 125 mph (201 km/h) over the Northeast Corridor and up to 110 mph (177 km/h) over the Main Line.

=== Ridership ===
Year	Passengers	Change	Passenger totals
FY08	1,127,518	-	
FY09	1,215,785	+7.8%	
FY10	1,296,838	+6.7%	
FY11	1,342,507	+3.5%	
FY12	1,420,392	+5.8%	
FY13	1,466,504	+3.2%	
FY14	1,326,450	−9.6%	
FY15	1,359,615	+2.5%	
FY16	1,467,216	+7.9%	
FY17	1,505,518	+2.6%	
FY18	1,519,936	+1.0%	
FY19	1,546,058	+1.7%	
FY20	783,764	−49.3%	
FY21	394,279	−49.7%	
FY22	806,430	+104.5%	
FY23	1,115,779	+38.4%	
FY24	1,269,005	+13.7%	
FY25	1,330,349	+4.8%	

=== Service ===
On weekdays there are thirteen Keystone trains and one Pennsylvanian train in each direction. All trains run between Harrisburg and Philadelphia, with nine Keystone trains plus the Pennsylvanian continuing on to New York. There are eight round-trip trains on both Saturdays and Sundays. All but one, including the Pennsylvanian, make the full trip between Harrisburg and New York. On the majority of the trains, the journey between Harrisburg and New York takes approximately 3 hours and 30 minutes, including 1 hour and 45 minutes to travel between Harrisburg and Philadelphia. There are also several express trains which cut both journey times by approximately 15 minutes each.

== Stations ==
State	Miles (km)	Town/City	Station	Connections
New York	0	New York City	Penn Station	Amtrak (long-distance): Cardinal, Crescent, Lake Shore Limited, Palmetto, Silver Meteor; Amtrak (intercity): Acela, Adirondack, Berkshire Flyer, Carolinian, Empire Service, Ethan Allen Express, Maple Leaf, Northeast Regional, Pennsylvanian, Vermonter; Long Island Rail Road: ■ City Terminal Zone, ■ Port Washington Branch; NJ Transit: ■ North Jersey Coast Line, ■ Northeast Corridor Line, ■ Gladstone Branch, ■ Montclair–Boonton Line, ■ Morristown Line; NYC Subway: PATH: HOB-33 JSQ-33 JSQ-33 (via HOB); Local bus: MTA Bus; Intercity bus: FlixBus, Tripper Bus, Vamoose Bus
New Jersey	10 (16)	Newark	Newark Penn Station	Amtrak: Acela, Cardinal, Carolinian, Crescent, Northeast Regional, Palmetto, Pennsylvanian, Silver Meteor, Vermonter; Newark Light Rail; NJ Transit: ■ North Jersey Coast Line, ■ Northeast Corridor Line, ■ Raritan Valley Line; PATH: NWK-WTC; Local bus: NJ Transit Bus; Intercity bus: Greyhound, Coach USA, FlixBus, Fullington Trailways
New Jersey	13 (21)	Newark	Newark Airport	AirTrain Newark to Newark Liberty International Airport; Amtrak: Northeast Regional; NJ Transit: ■ North Jersey Coast Line, ■ Northeast Corridor Line
New Jersey	25 (40)	Iselin	Metropark	Amtrak: Acela, Northeast Regional, Palmetto, Vermonter; NJ Transit: ■ Northeast Corridor Line; Local bus: NJ Transit Bus
New Jersey	33 (53)	New Brunswick	New Brunswick	Amtrak: Northeast Regional; NJ Transit: ■ Northeast Corridor Line; Local bus: NJ Transit Bus; Intercity bus: Flixbus, Suburban Transit
New Jersey	49 (79)	West Windsor	Princeton Junction	Amtrak: Northeast Regional; NJ Transit: ■ Northeast Corridor Line, ■ Princeton Branch; Local bus: NJ Transit Bus
New Jersey	58 (93)	Trenton	Trenton	Amtrak: Cardinal, Carolinian, Crescent, Northeast Regional, Palmetto, Pennsylvanian, Silver Meteor, Vermonter; NJ Transit: ■ Northeast Corridor Line, ■ River Line; SEPTA Regional Rail: ■ Trenton Line; Local bus: SEPTA Suburban Bus, NJ Transit Bus
Pennsylvania	74 (119)	Cornwells Heights	Cornwells Heights	SEPTA Regional Rail: ■ Trenton Line; Local bus: SEPTA City Bus, SEPTA Suburban Bus
Pennsylvania	86 (138)	Philadelphia	North Philadelphia	SEPTA Regional Rail: ■ Trenton Line, ■ Chestnut Hill West Line; SEPTA Metro: Local bus: SEPTA City Bus
Pennsylvania	91 (146)	Philadelphia	30th Street Station	Amtrak: Acela, Cardinal, Carolinian, Crescent, Northeast Regional, Palmetto, Pennsylvanian, Silver Meteor, Vermonter; SEPTA Regional Rail: all lines NJ Transit: ■ Atlantic City Line; SEPTA Metro: Local bus: SEPTA City Bus, SEPTA Suburban Bus, NJ Transit Bus; Intercity bus: Martz Trailways, Peter Pan
Pennsylvania	95 (153)	Philadelphia	Overbrook	Bypassed in 1988
Pennsylvania	97 (156)	Narberth	Narberth	Bypassed in 1982
Pennsylvania	99 (159)	Ardmore	Ardmore	SEPTA Regional Rail: ■ Paoli/Thorndale Line; Local bus: SEPTA City Bus, SEPTA Suburban Bus
Pennsylvania	100 (160)	Bryn Mawr	Bryn Mawr	Bypassed in 1988
Pennsylvania	113 (182)	Radnor	Radnor	Bypassed in 1982
Pennsylvania	115 (185)	Wayne	Wayne	Bypassed in 1988
Pennsylvania	110 (180)	Paoli	Paoli	Amtrak: Pennsylvanian; SEPTA Regional Rail: ■ Paoli/Thorndale Line; Local bus: SEPTA Suburban Bus
Pennsylvania	111 (179)	Malvern	Malvern	Bypassed in 1998
Pennsylvania	112 (180)	Exton	Exton	SEPTA Regional Rail: ■ Paoli/Thorndale Line; Local bus: SEPTA Suburban Bus, West Chester University shuttle
Pennsylvania	113 (182)	Whitford	Whitford	Bypassed in 1998
Pennsylvania	123 (198)	Downingtown	Downingtown	SEPTA Regional Rail: ■ Paoli/Thorndale Line; Local bus: SEPTA Suburban Bus
Pennsylvania	129 (208)	Coatesville	Coatesville	Local bus: SEPTA Suburban Bus, ChescoBus
Pennsylvania	133 (214)	Parkesburg	Parkesburg	Local bus: ChescoBus
Pennsylvania	159 (256)	Lancaster	Lancaster	Amtrak: Pennsylvanian; Local bus: Red Rose Transit Authority
Pennsylvania	171 (275)	Mount Joy	Mount Joy	Local bus: Red Rose Transit Authority
Pennsylvania	177 (285)	Elizabethtown	Elizabethtown	Amtrak: Pennsylvanian; Local bus: Red Rose Transit Authority
Pennsylvania	185 (298)	Middletown	Middletown	Local bus: Capital Area Transit
Pennsylvania	195 (314)	Harrisburg	Harrisburg Transportation Center	Amtrak: Pennsylvanian; Local bus: Capital Area Transit, Lebanon Transit, rabbittransit Intercity bus: Greyhound, FlixBus, Fullington Trailways
