= Big Apple Township, Oregon County, Missouri =

Township in Oregon County, Missouri, U.S.

Coordinates: 36.6156°N 91.6278°W

Big Apple Township is an inactive township in Oregon County, in the U.S. state of Missouri.

Big Apple Township was so named on account of apple orchards within its borders.
