= Big Apple (Colborne, Ontario) =

Roadside attraction in Colborne, Ontario, Canada

Coordinates: 44°01′20″N 77°54′20″W

The Big Apple
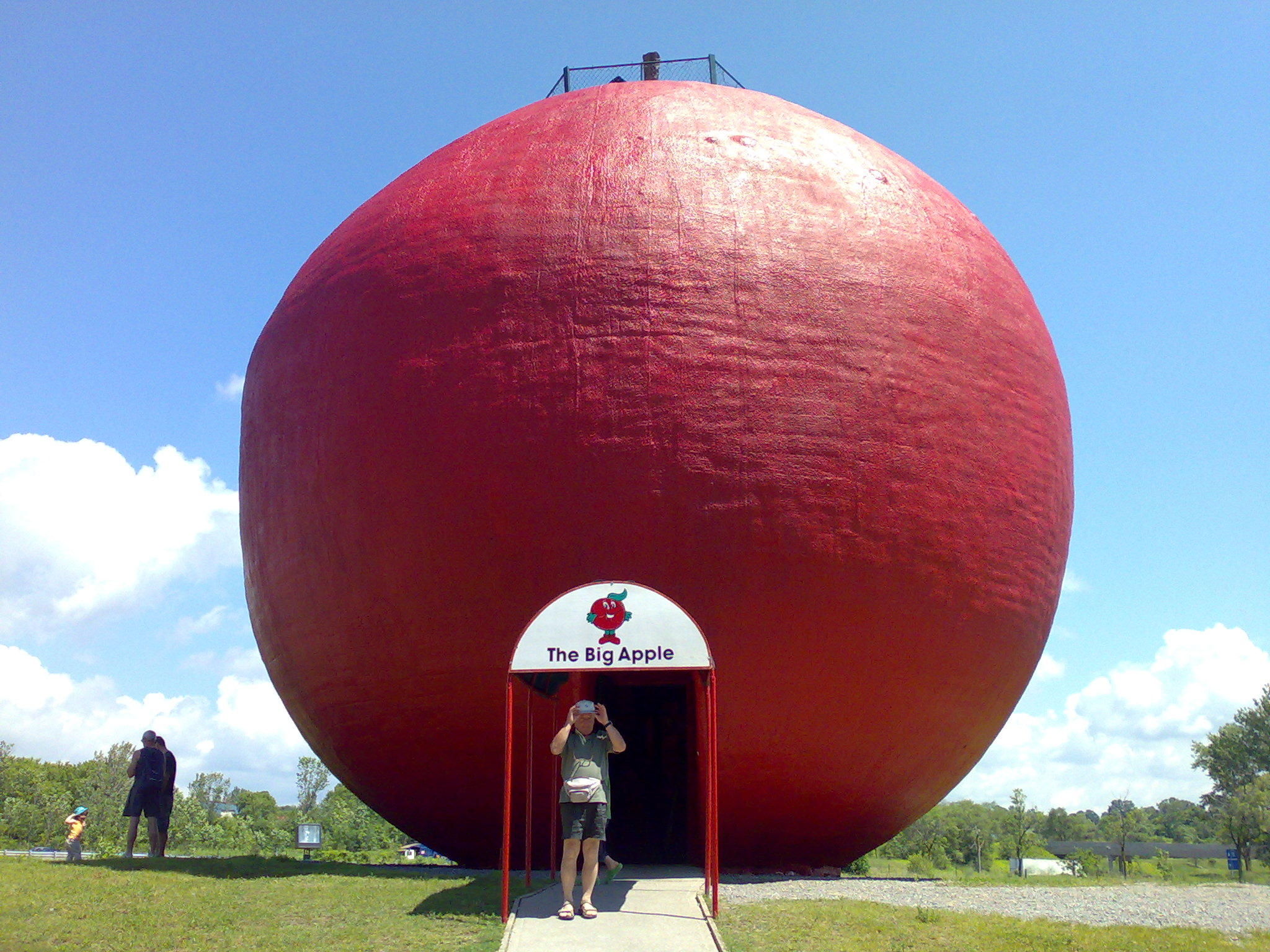
- The Big Apple in 2006
- Interactive map of the The Big Apple area

General information
- Location: Colborne, Ontario, Canada
- Completed: 1987

Height
- Height: 12.1 m (40 ft)

The Big Apple is a roadside attraction in Colborne, a village in the municipality of Cramahe, in Northumberland County, Ontario, Canada. Located on the south side of Ontario Highway 401 at interchange 497 (Northumberland County Road 25/Percy Street), it is easily recognizable from the highway by its large apple-shaped structure, claimed to be the world's largest.

== History ==
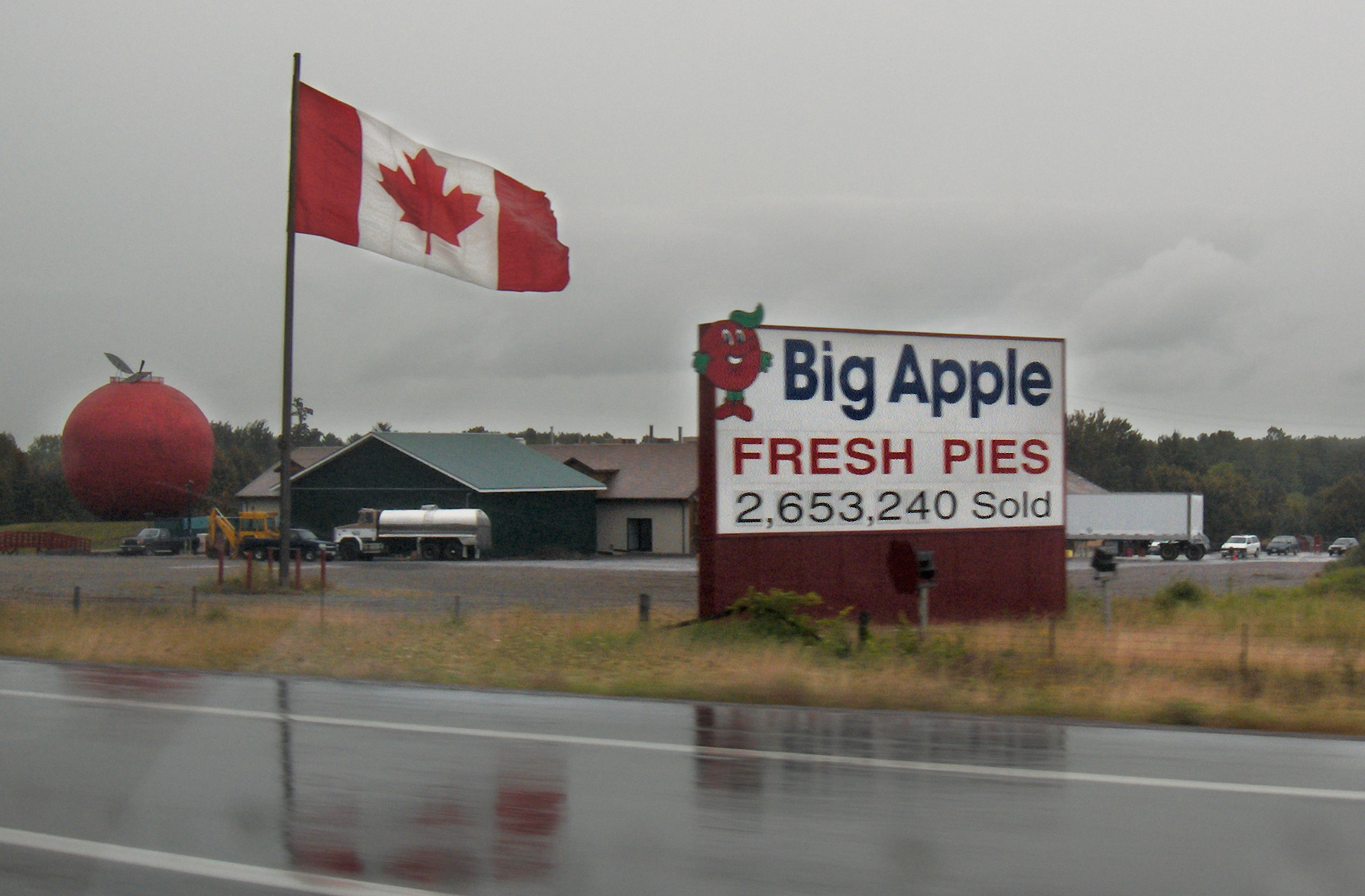
View from Highway 401, circa 2006

The Big Apple was conceived by George Boycott, an Australian immigrant to Canada who took inspiration from the Big Pineapple in Sunshine Coast Region, Queensland. Boycott sold the six pizza shops he owned in Australia and moved to Colborne in 1976, the village being one of the largest apple-producing areas in Ontario. Boycott sold real estate in Ontario to fund the construction of the Big Apple. In 1983 he met Henry Mensen, a local builder, with whom Boycott planned the construction of the Big Apple over the next five years.

The Big Apple opened in 1987, with its construction costs covered through a combination of a government loan and investment by Doug Rutherford, the owner of a local trucking company. Boycott sold his stake in the Big Apple in 1992, and began to pursue a career in real estate and local politics; he served in several government positions over the subsequent fourteen years, including as the final reeve of Colborne prior to its amalgamation with Cramahe in 2001.

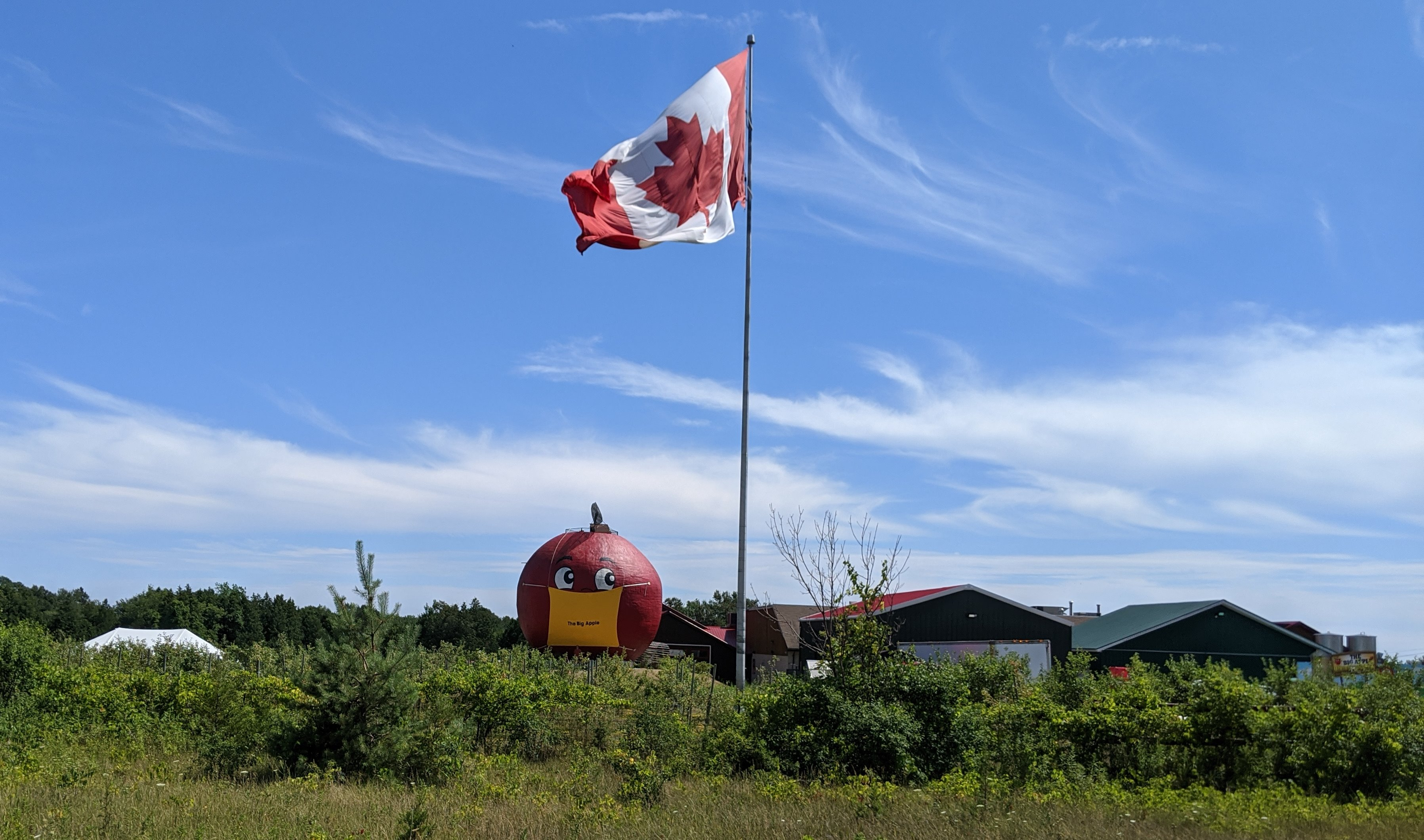
Big Apple during COVID-19 with face mask

In 2013, a cartoon face was painted on the Big Apple. In April 2020, amid the COVID-19 pandemic in Ontario, the Big Apple donated hundreds of apple pies to hospital workers. In July 2020, a face mask was hung on the Big Apple in a show of support for front-line workers.

== Operations ==
The primary attraction of the Big Apple is the eponymous Big Apple, a 12.1 m (40 ft) tall, 11.5 m (38 ft) wide apple-shaped structure named "Mr. Applehead". The Big Apple claims to be the largest apple-shaped structure in the world. The structure contains apple-based trivia in its interior, and an observation deck on its roof. The structure weighs 42 tonnes, and can purportedly hold 650,000 apples.

In addition to the apple structure, the Big Apple contains a dine-in restaurant, a pie factory, a souvenir store, a petting zoo, an amusement park (for small children), a miniature golf course, and an outdoor picnic area. The Big Apple hosts more than 500,000 visitors per year and sells 2,000 pies per week, and has sold over 7.9 million pies since its initial opening.

== See also ==
- Peachoid
- The Big Orange
- The Big Apple (Waitomo)
