= The Escape =

The Escape may refer to:

== Film and television ==
=== Film ===
- The Escape (1914 film), an American silent film directed by D. W. Griffith
- The Escape (1926 film), an American silent Western
- The Escape (1928 film), an American silent drama
- The Escape (1939 film), an American crime film
- The Escape (1944 film), a Mexican historical adventure film
- The Escape (1972 film), a Hong Kong film directed by Peter Yang Kwan
- The Escape (1998 film), a Canadian action film directed by Stuart Gillard
- The Escape (2009 film), a Danish drama
- The Escape (2016 film), a short action film produced by BMW
- The Escape (2017 film), a British drama
- Gulumaal: The Escape, a 2009 Indian comedy film

=== Television episodes ===
- "The Escape" (Animorphs episode), 1998
- "The Escape" (Doctor Who), third episode of The Daleks, 1964
- "The Escape" (MacGyver), 1986
- "The Escape" (Modern Family), 2018
- "The Escape" (The O.C.), 2003
- "The Escape" (Star Wars Resistance)
- "The Escape" (What We Do in the Shadows), 2021

== Literature ==
- The Escape (Baldacci novel), a 2014 John Puller novel by David Baldacci
- The Escape (Muchamore novel), a 2009 Henderson's Boys novel by Robert Muchamore
- The Escape, a 1998 Animorphs novel by K. A. Applegate
- The Escape, a 1995 Star Trek: Voyager novel by Dean Wesley Smith and Kristine Kathryn Rusch
- The Escape; or, A Leap for Freedom, an 1858 play by William Wells Brown

== Music ==
- The Escape (band), a 1980s British new wave band
- The Escape, a 2011 EP by the Agonist
- "The Escape", a 2016 song by Oh Land from Askepot

== Other uses ==
- Escape Nightclub, or The Escape, a defunct all-ages LGBT-friendly nightclub in Portland, Oregon, US
- The Escape, Pennsylvania, a census-designated place

== See also ==
- Escape (disambiguation)
- The Great Escape (disambiguation)
