= SISTINE =

NASA mission to study stars as clues of life on exoplanets

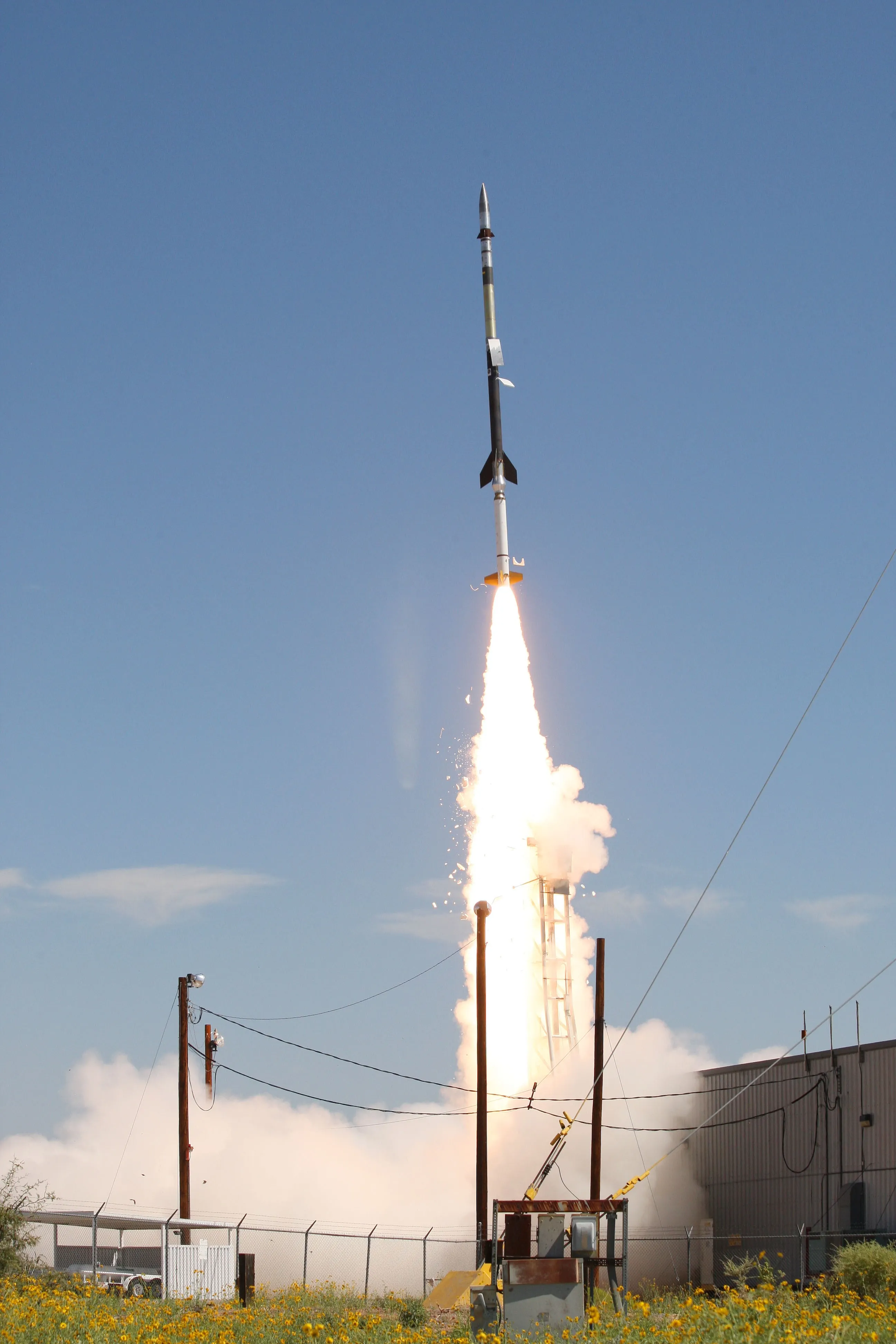
Black Brant 9 sounding rocket launch

SISTINE (also known as SISTINE Mission and SISTINE Program) (acronym for "Suborbital Imaging Spectrograph for Transition region Irradiance from Nearby Exoplanet host stars") is a NASA mission designed to study distant stars as a way of finding life on exoplanets.

The technology to be employed is up to 100 times the UV spectroscopic ability of the Hubble Space Telescope. The first test of the mission was launched on a Black Brant 9 rocket, a two-stage sounding rocket, at White Sands Missile Range, New Mexico, on 11 August 2019. This suborbital rocket can carry a payload of up to 1200 pounds, which, in the case of SISTINE, includes spectrographic equipment capable of covering the far ultra-violet spectral range of 100 to 160 nm, well suited to study strong atomic emission lines associated with the formation temperatures in the atmospheres of low-mass stars, and their effects on the potential atmospheres of exoplanets.

The second launch of SISTINE occurred on 8 November 2021. This launch focused on observing the spectra of Procyon A.

A third launch occurred on 6 July 2022 at 13:47 UTC from the Arnhem Space Centre in Nhulunbuy, Australia, reaching an apogee of 243 km (151 mi). This launch focused on the spectra of Alpha Centauri A and B in the Alpha Centauri system which contains three stars and Proxima Centauri b, the closest exoplanet to the Earth.

The principal investigator of the mission is astronomer Kevin France, Assistant Professor at the Department of Astrophysical and Planetary Sciences, Laboratory for Atmospheric and Space Physics, University of Colorado in Boulder, Colorado.

== See also ==
- Sounding rocket
- Ultraviolet astronomy
- Ultraviolet–visible spectroscopy
