= Lebanon Valley Mall =

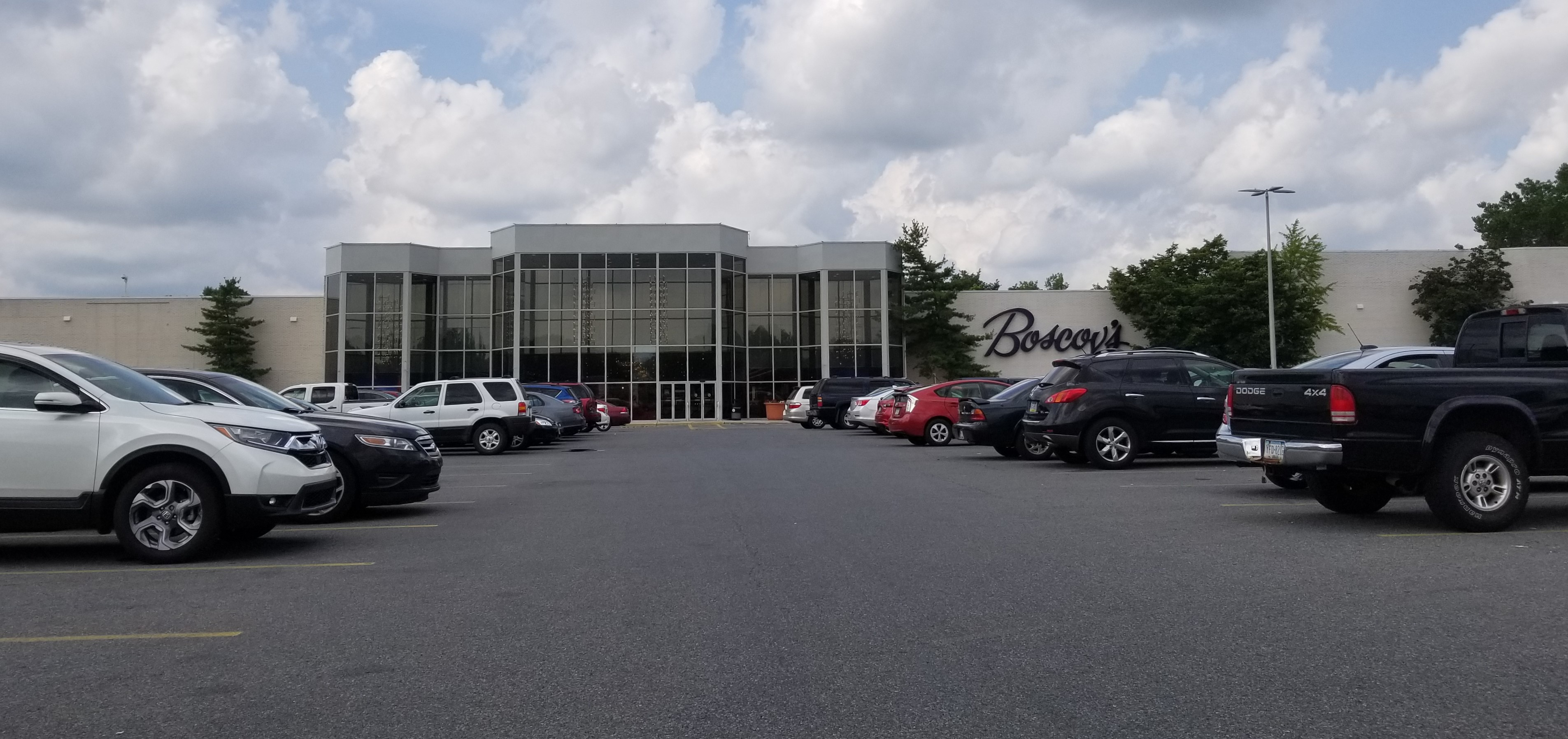
- Boscov's at Lebanon Valley Mall, August 2018
- Location: North Lebanon Township, Pennsylvania, United States
- Coordinates: 40.34098°N 76.45093°W
- Address: 2231 Lebanon Valley Mall, Route 422
- Opened: September 10, 1975; 51 years ago
- Developer: Lebanon Valley Mall Company (Boscov's)
- Manager: Prizm Asset Management Group
- Owner: Boscov's
- Num. of stores: 40 (when fully leased)
- Num. of anchor tenants: 4
- Floor area: 396,810 sq ft (36,865 m^{2})
- Floors: 1
- Parking: 2,207 spaces
- Public transit: LT bus: 1, 8, 16
- Website: lebanonvalleymall.com

The Lebanon Valley Mall is a shopping mall located just west of Lebanon, Pennsylvania. It is anchored by Boscov's, Hobby Lobby, and Planet Fitness.

== History ==
Lebanon Valley Mall was built on the site of a landfill. Boscov's Department Store opened in August 1972 and the mall was completed in 1975. The Boscov's store at Lebanon Valley Mall was the first Boscov's location to be opened outside of Berks County. The Lebanon Valley Mall Company, a real estate development group owned by parent company Boscov's, oversaw construction of this mall on U.S. Route 422 on the west side of town. Boscov's then served as one of the original anchor stores, along with G. C. Murphy's discount division, Murphy's Mart. Other major tenants upon opening included Acme Markets, Rea & Derrick drugstore, Kinney Shoes, RadioShack, Zales Jewelers, Hardee's, General Nutrition Center, Waldenbooks, and a movie theater. In 1988, following the closure of the Acme Markets grocery store, Boscov's expanded into that space.

Work on the next major expansion began in 1996; JCPenney then became a new anchor, but has since closed. Great Escape Lebanon Valley 10 opened at the mall in 2006 and was later changed to a Regal in 2014 after the chains sale. After the 2014 renaming, the theater property was sold several times. The mall previously had a Fox Theater. In 2010, mall managers announced that Hobby Lobby would open that year in the former JCPenney space. Planet Fitness then opened in early 2014, using part of the former Ames space. Price Rite opened in June 2015. Price Rite closed in September 2024. Regal closed in January 2025.

== See also ==
- List of shopping malls in Pennsylvania

== Gallery ==
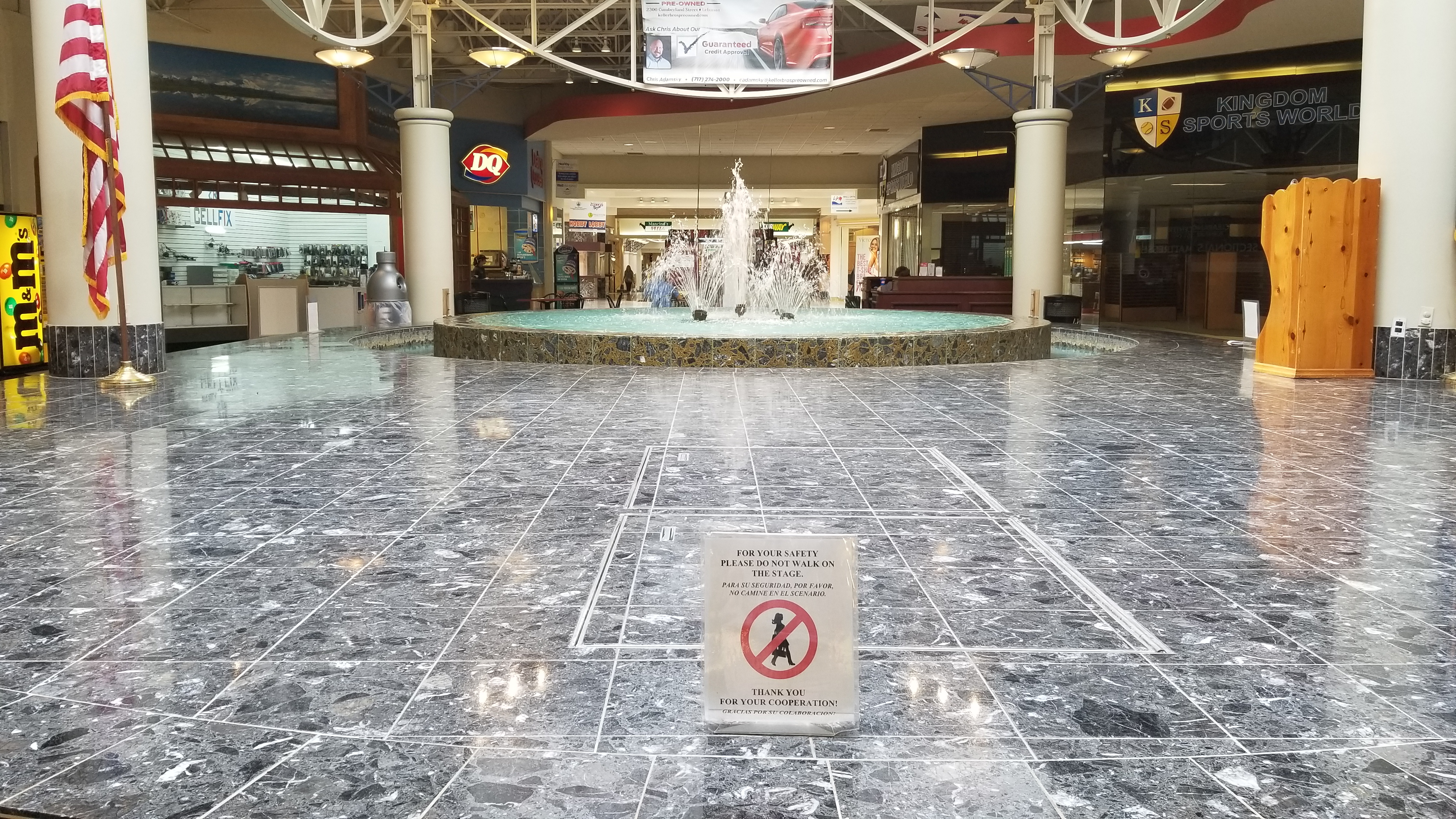
Mall fountain, 2018
