= Great Escape =

Great Escape or The Great Escape may refer to:

== History ==
In chronological order

- The great Carson City prison escape (September 17, 1871), the prison break from Nevada State Prison
- Stalag Luft III escape (1944), known as the "Great Escape", a World War II mass escape from the German prisoner-of-war camp Stalag Luft III
- June 1962 Alcatraz escape, sometimes referred to as "The Great Escape"
- Maze Prison escape (1983), known to Irish Republicans as the "Great Escape"

== Arts, entertainment, and media ==
=== Film and TV ===
- The Great Escape (film), a 1963 film dramatising the Stalag Luft III escape, based on Paul Brickhill's 1950 book of the same name

==== TV series ====
- The Great Escape (American TV series), a 2012 reality series
- The Great Escape (Irish TV series), a 2006–2009 documentary series
- Great Escape (South Korean TV series), a 2018–2021 reality series

==== TV episodes ====
- "The Great Escape" (Aaahh!!! Real Monsters)
- "The Great Escape" (The Chief)
- "The Great Escape", an episode of Game On
- "The Great Escape", an episode of The Life and Times of Juniper Lee
- "The Great Escape", an episode of Married... with Children
- "The Great Escape" (Monster Allergy episode)
- "The Great Escape!", an episode of The Raccoons
- "The Great Escape" (Runaways)
- "The Great Escape", an episode of Tanner '88

=== Literature ===
- The Great Escape (book), a 1950 book by Paul Brickhill describing the 1944 Stalag Luft III escape
- The Great Escape (1971), a children's book by Monica Dickens
- The Great Escape: Or, The Sewer Story (1973), a children's story about sewer alligators by Peter Lippman (Golden Press)
- A Great Escape (1990), a children's book by Colin Dann
- Upchuck and the Rotten Willy: The Great Escape (1998), a children's book by Bill Wallace
- The Great Escape (2002), a short story collection by Ian Watson
- The Great Escape (2007), a children's book by Natalie Haynes
- The Great Escape (2012), a novel by Susan Elizabeth Phillips and the seventh installment in the Wynette, Texas series
- The Great Escape: Health, Wealth, and the Origins of Inequality (2013), a non-fiction book by Angus Deaton

=== Music ===
==== Albums ====
- Great Escape (Tara Blaise album), or the title song
- The Great Escape (Blur album), 1995
- The Great Escape (EP), by Morning Runner, or the title song (see below)
- The Great Escape (Ilse DeLange album), or the title song
- The Great Escape (Larry June album), 2023
- The Great Escape (Richard Clapton album), 1982
- The Great Escape (Seventh Wonder album), 2010
- Great Escape (The Rifles album), or the title song

==== Songs ====
- "Great Escape" (Cinema Staff song), 2013
- "Great Escape", by Guster from Goldfly, 1997
- "Great Escape", by Moby from 18, 2002
- "Great Escape", by Tini from Tini, 2016
- "The Great Escape" (Boys Like Girls song), 2007
- "The Great Escape", by Blanco and Central Cee, 2021
- "The Great Escape", by BT from Emotional Technology, 2003
- "The Great Escape", by Dala from Best Day, 2012
- "The Great Escape", by Girls' Generation from Girls' Generation, 2011
- "The Great Escape", by Marillion from Brave, 1994
- "The Great Escape", by Morning Runner from Wilderness Is Paradise Now, 2006
- "The Great Escape", by Nelson from Because They Can, 1995
- "The Great Escape", by P!nk from The Truth About Love, 2012
- "The Great Escape", by Patrick Watson from Close to Paradise, 2006
- "The Great Escape", by We Are Scientists from With Love and Squalor, 2005
- "The Great Escape", by Woodkid from The Golden Age, 2013

==== Other uses in music ====
- The Great Escape (festival), an Australian music festival
- The Great Escape Festival, a music festival in Brighton, England
- The Great Escape Tour, 2015 tour by Australian rapper Iggy Azalea

=== Video games ===
- Great Escape (1983 video game), a game for the Atari 2600
- The Great Escape (1986 video game), a game which shares a title and similar plot to the movie
- The Great Escape (2003 video game), a game based on the film
- Rayman 2: The Great Escape, a 1999 platforming video game and the sequel to Rayman
- Great Escape!, the in-game title of Monty Is Innocent, a 1985 game for the ZX Spectrum

== Sport ==
- "The Great Escape", West Bromwich Albion's escape from relegation during the FA Premier League 2004–2005 season
- "The Great Escape", Salford City's escape from relegation during the Northern Premier League 2008–2009 season

== Other uses ==
- Great Escape (amusement park), an amusement park and outdoor water park in Queensbury, New York, U.S.
- Great Escape Lodge, a resort and indoor water park in Queensbury, New York, U.S.
- Great Escape Theatres, a movie theatre chain primarily in the Midwestern U.S.
- The Great Escape, a former amusement park in Hillarys Boat Harbour, Perth, Australia

== See also ==
- The Great Escaper, a 2023 movie
- The Grape Escape, board game originally released in 1992
