= Scape =

Scape may refer to:

== Arts ==
- SCAPE Public Art, public art organisation in Christchurch, New Zealand

== Biology ==
- The basal, "stalk" part of a projecting insect organ, such as first (basal) segment of an antenna or the oviscape of the ovipositor
- A finger-like appendage of the epigyne of a female spider
- Scape (botany), part of a flowering stem

== Cooking ==
- Garlic scapes, the edible, immature flowering stems of the garlic plant

== Gaming ==
- Planescape, a campaign setting for the Dungeons & Dragons fantasy role-playing game
- RuneScape, a massively multiplayer online role-playing game

== Television ==
- Farscape, an Australian science fiction television series

== See also ==
- Escape (disambiguation)
- Landscape, the visible features of an area of land
  - Cityscape, the urban equivalent of a landscape
- Scapegoating, singling out one person for unmerited negative treatment or blame
- Soundscape, a part of an acoustic environment
