= Escape =

Escape or Escaping may refer to:

== Arts and media ==
=== Film ===
- Escape (1928 film), a German silent drama film
- Escape! (film), a 1930 British crime film starring Austin Trevor and Edna Best
- Escape (1940 film), starring Robert Taylor and Norma Shearer, based on the novel by Ethel Vance
- Escape (1948 film), starring Rex Harrison
- Escape (1971 film), a television movie starring Christopher George and William Windom
- Escape (1980 film), a television movie starring Timothy Bottoms and Colleen Dewhurst
- Escape (1988 film), an Egyptian film directed by Atef El-Tayeb
- Escape (2012 American film), a thriller starring C. Thomas Howell, John Rhys-Davies, Anora Lyn
- Escape (2012 Norwegian film), a thriller originally titled Flukt
- Escapes (film), a 2017 documentary film about Blade Runner screenwriter Hampton Fancher
- Escape (2021 film), a Malayalam film starring Santhosh Keezhattoor
- Escape (2023 film), a Malaysian film starring Kamal Adli
- Escape (2024 South Korean film), an action film starring Lee Je-hoon and Koo Kyo-hwan
- Escape (2024 Spanish film), a Spanish thriller directed by Rodrigo Cortés

=== Literature ===
==== Books ====
- Escape! The Story of the Great Houdini, a 2006 book by Sid Fleischman
- Escape (Jessop and Palmer book), a 2007 book about Jessop's upbringing in a Fundamentalist Church of Jesus Christ of Latter-Day Saints polygamous community
- Escape (Choose Your Own Adventure), a Choose Your Own Adventure book
- Escape (McMillan book), a 2008 autobiographical book by smuggler David McMillan
- Escape, a 1939 novel by Grace Zaring Stone under the pseudonym Ethel Vance
- Escape, a 2022 novel by K.R. Alexander.

==== Other literature ====
- Escape (play), a 1926 play by the British writer John Galsworthy
- Escape (magazine), a British comic strip magazine published between 1983 and 1989
- "Escape!", a 1945 science fiction short story by Isaac Asimov
- Escape (manga), a 1981 short manga by Akira Toriyama

=== Music ===
==== Albums ====
- Escape (Enrique Iglesias album), or the title song (see below), 2001
- Escape (Gorgon City album), 2018
- Escape (Jody Harris and Robert Quine album), 1981
- Escape (Journey album), or the title song, 1981
- Escape (Nine Lashes album), 2009
- Escape (Ram-Zet album), 2002
- Escape (Whodini album), or the title song, 1984
- Escape (EP), by Kim Hyung-jun, 2012
- Escape, an EP by Daoko with Yohji Igarashi, 2022

==== Songs ====
- "Escape" (Enrique Iglesias song), 2001
- "Escape" (Misia song), 2000
- "Escape (The Piña Colada Song)", by Rupert Holmes, 1979
- "Escape", a song by Alice Cooper from Welcome to My Nightmare
- "Escape", a song by Craig Armstrong
- "Escape", a song by (G)I-dle from I Never Die
- "Escape", a song by Hoobastank from The Reason
- "Escape", a song by Kehlani from SweetSexySavage
- "Escape", a song by Kx5 and Hayla
- "Escape", a song by Matisyahu from Light
- "Escape", a song by Metallica from Ride the Lightning
- "Escape", a song by Muse from Showbiz
- "Escape", a song by Stray Kids from Mixtape: Dominate
- "Escape", a song by Zara Larsson from Venus
- "Escaping" (song), by Margaret Urlich, 1989
- "Escaping", a song by Blues Traveler from the single "Run-Around", 1995
- "Escaping", a song by High Flight Society from High Flight Society, 2007
- "Escaping", a song by Kathryn Williams from Over Fly Over, 2005
- "Escaping", a song by Kiko Loureiro from No Gravity, 2005

=== Radio ===
- Escape (radio program), a radio drama series on CBS
- Escape (Sirius XM), a music channel on satellite radio

=== Television ===
- Escape (TV network), American TV network now named Ion Mystery since 2022
- Escape (1950 TV series), a 1950 American drama anthology series that aired on CBS
- Escape (1973 TV series), a 1973 American adventure anthology series that aired on NBC
- Escape (British TV series), a 1957 British anthology series
- Escape, a Thomas the Tank Engine and Friends episode
- Escape, a Bluey episode

=== Video games ===
- Escape (video game), a ZX Spectrum video game developed and released by New Generation Software in 1982
- Westone Bit Entertainment, a video game company formerly known as Escape

== Science and technology ==
=== Computing ===
- Escape character, a character that signifies that what follows takes an alternative interpretation
  - Escape sequence, a series of characters used to trigger some sort of command state in computers
- Escape key, the "Esc" key on a computer keyboard

=== Life sciences ===
- Antigenic escape, inability to respond to an infectious agent
- Escape response, instinctive behaviour in animals

=== Space science ===
- Extreme-ultraviolet Stellar Characterization for Atmospheric Physics and Evolution, a NASA Small Explorer satellite
- Escape from a gravitationally bound orbit, by exceeding escape velocity

== Other uses ==
- Fire escape, a type of emergency exit often found on multiple-storey residential buildings
- Ford Escape, a small sport utility vehicle
- Prison escape, the act of breaking out of prison

== See also ==
- The Escape (disambiguation)
- Escapism, mental diversion by means of entertainment or recreation
- Escapology, the study and practice of escaping from physical restraints
- E-scape, an educational assessment project at Goldsmiths University, London
- Escapa (disambiguation)
- Xscape (disambiguation)
- Escape Cliffs, a historic settlement site in the Northern Territory, Australia
- ESKAPE
