= Harrisburg Mall =

Coordinates: 40.252°N 76.830°W

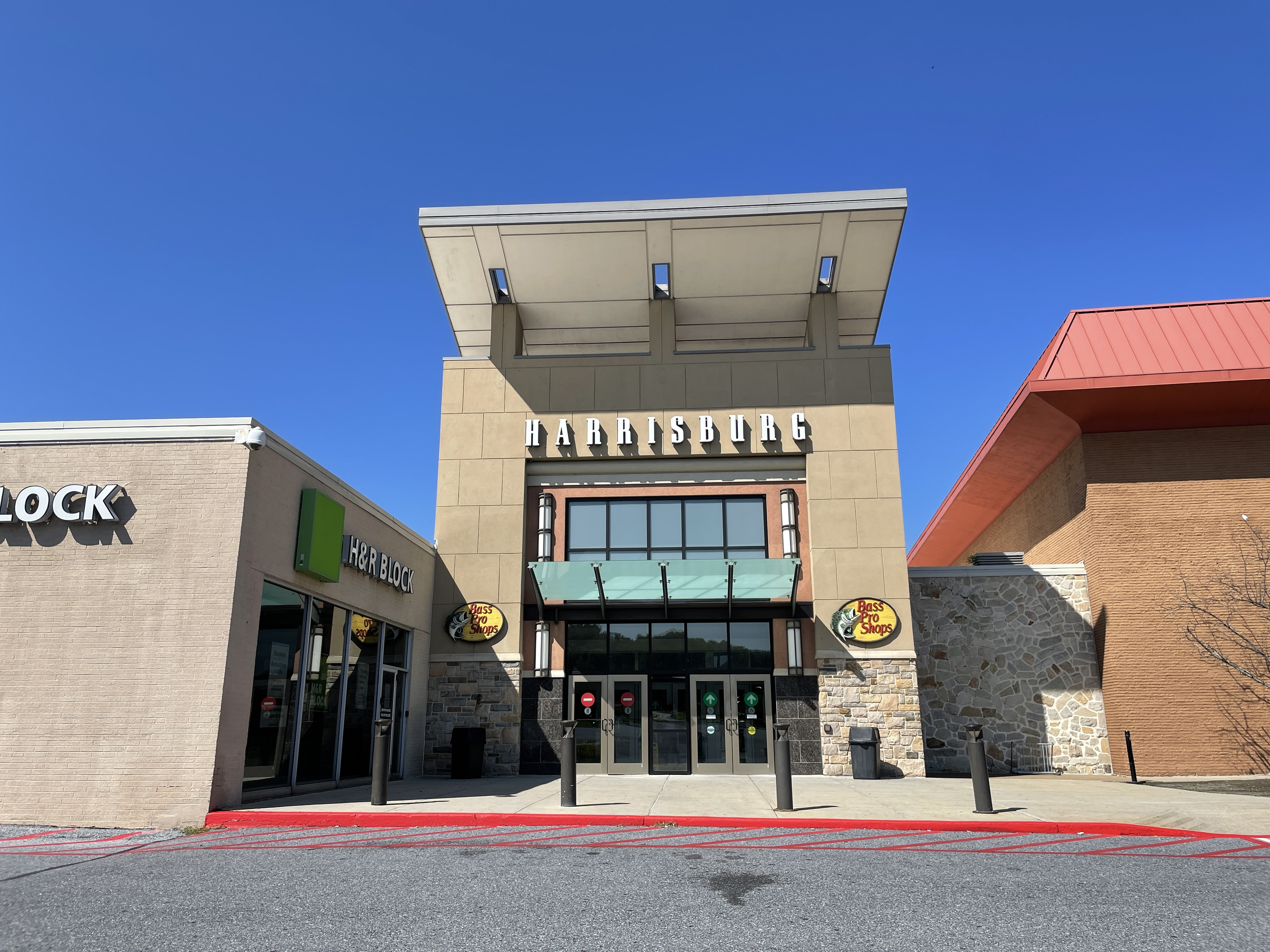
- Harrisburg Mall entrance near Bass Pro Shops in September 2022
- Location: Swatara Township, Pennsylvania, U.S.
- Address: 3501 Paxton Street Harrisburg, PA 17111
- Opened: 1969
- Closed: January 31, 2024
- Developer: M.A. Kravitz/Fidelity Mutual Life Insurance
- Owner: St. John Properties
- Num. of stores: 35+
- Num. of anchor tenants: 3 (1 open, 2 vacant)
- Floor area: 995,000 square feet (92,400 m^{2})
- Floors: 2 (3 in former Macy's, private 3rd floor in Bass Pro Shops from original Wanamaker's)
- Public transit: CAT bus: 6/13, 8, 19, 20
- Website: www.shopharrisburgmall.com

The Harrisburg Mall was a regional mall located just outside Harrisburg in Swatara Township, Pennsylvania. It was the largest mall in the Harrisburg metropolitan area. The anchor store is Bass Pro Shops. There are 2 vacant anchor stores that were once Macy's and Boscov's.

== History ==
The mall, formerly known as the Harrisburg East Mall, opened in 1969, initially with Wanamaker's, and Gimbels as anchors, with JCPenney opening later. During construction a natural limestone cave known variously as Big Pit, Paxtang or Crystal Paradise Cave known for its anthodite and speleothem formations was uncovered.

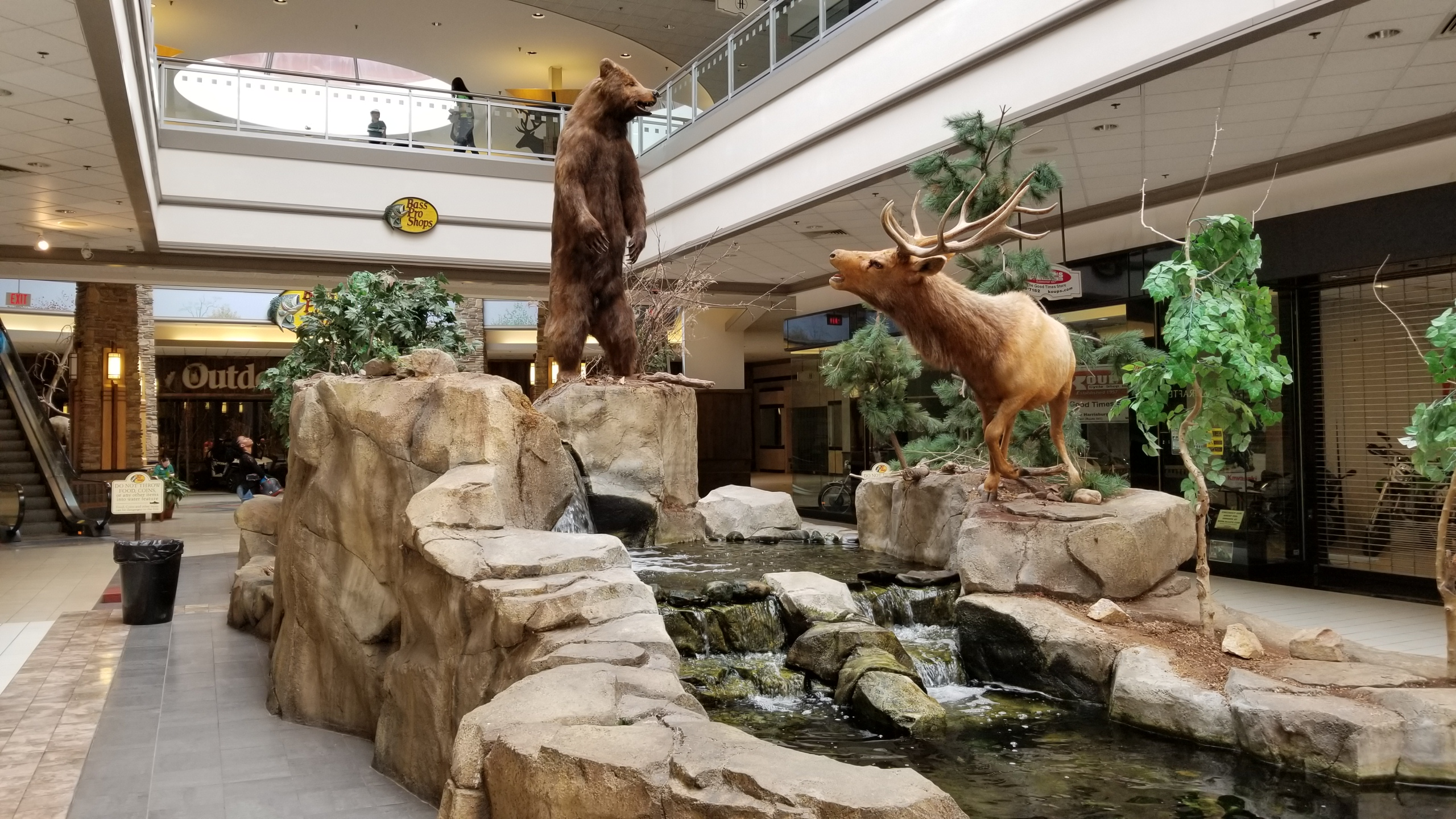
Interior view of Harrisburg Mall near Bass Pro Shops, March 2018

In 1978, Gimbels closed, due to poor sales at the location as well as its distance from the other stores in the chain which made it unprofitable. Hess's opened in that space later the same year.

In 1994, Hess's sold their remaining locations to May Company Department Stores. May rebranded the location as Hecht's.

In 1999, Wanamaker's closed, and Lord & Taylor opened a year later.

In 2001, JCPenney closed, and Boscov's opened in that space in 2003.

In 2004, A $77 million revitalization of the mall which, in addition to renovations to the mall's decor, included the addition of a 14-screen Great Escape theater and entertainment complex on the southwest corner of the mall. The last phase of the renovation was planned to be completed in 2008 with a brand new "streetscape" look on the north side of the mall. However, the addition remained uncompleted in 2009, due in part to changing market conditions, as well financial difficulties with the mall's owner, Feldman Mall Properties. All three of these stores were abandoned in an unfinished state.

In 2004, Lord & Taylor closed, and Bass Pro Shops opened later that year, after a two floor expansion of the building was built, and the Wanamaker's third floor was made private.

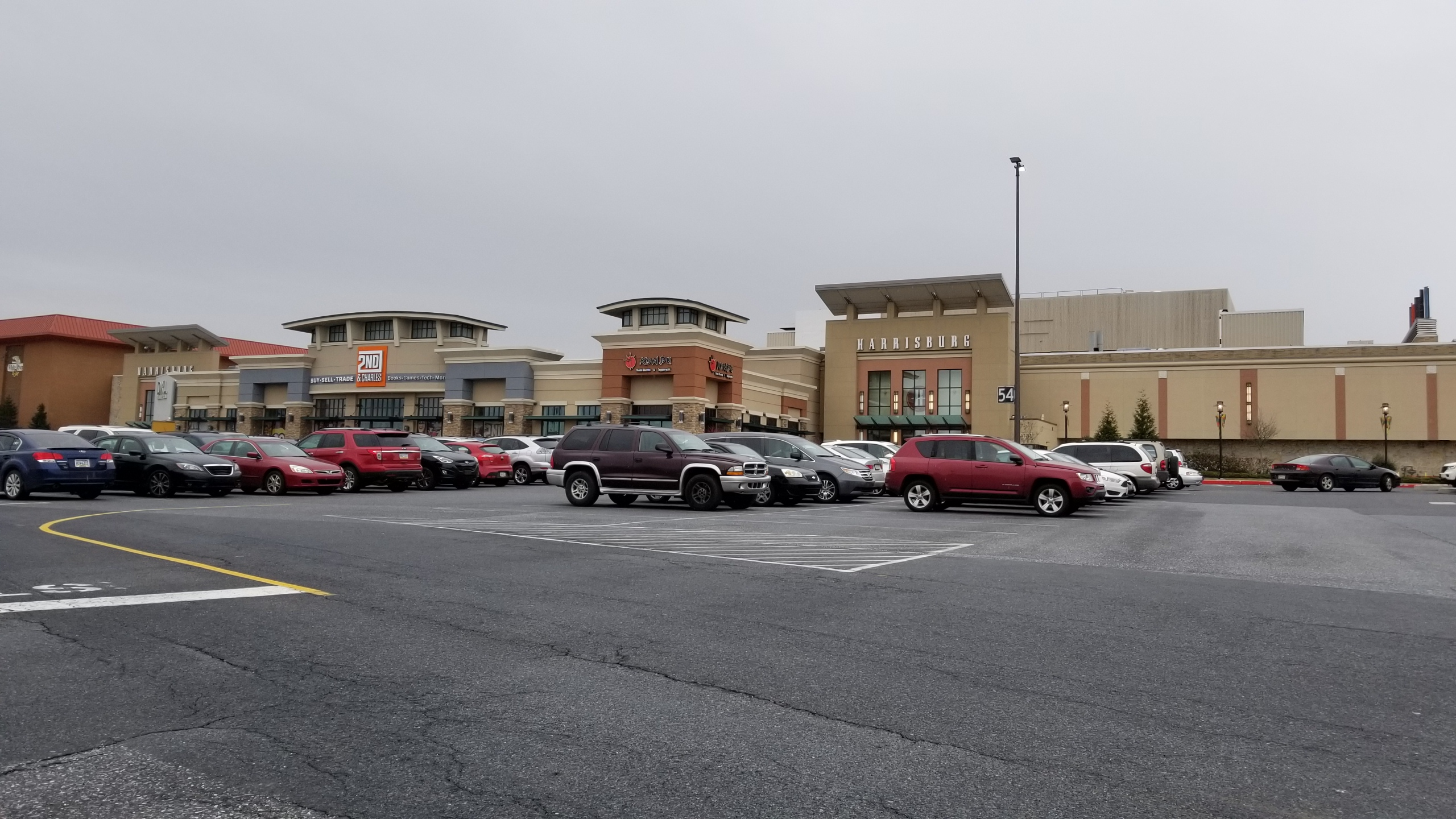
An exterior view of Harrisburg Mall, March 2018

In 2006, Hecht's was converted to Macy's due to Macy's parent company (Federated Department Stores) having acquired Hecht's parent company (May Department Stores) in 2005.

In 2008, Boscov's filed for Chapter 11 Bankruptcy, causing 10 stores to close, the Harrisburg Mall location being one of them. The building has been vacant since.

On July 9, 2009, the Harrisburg Mall was sold at sheriff's sale to three financial groups after the previous owner, Feldman Lubert Adler defaulted on a $52.5 million mortgage. In June 2012, Harrisburg Mall was purchased from TD Bank by Maryland-based commercial real estate developers St. John Properties and Petrie Ross Ventures, who collectively own or have developed over 25 million sq. ft. of commercial property in six states.

The Sega Sports Restaurant space was demolished in mid-2012. In 2013, Books-A-Million opened a 2nd & Charles store in the spot originally slated for Barnes & Noble.

On January 6, 2020, it was announced that Macy's would be closing in March 2020 as part of a plan to close 125 stores nationwide. After Macy's closed, Bass Pro Shops is the only anchor store left.

Harrisburg Mall post demolition

On February 7, 2023, St. John Properties revealed a redevelopment plan for the Harrisburg Mall in which the mall, with the exception of Bass Pro Shops, would be demolished and redeveloped to include retail along with business space that can be used for medical offices, schools, light manufacturing, and general offices. The redevelopment plan still needs approval. Demolition of the mall would begin no earlier than 2024. Tenants of the Harrisburg Mall have been given notices to vacate by January 31, 2024, to allow for demolition and redevelopment of the mall to begin.

On January 31, 2024, Harrisburg Mall officially closed, marking the end of its 54-year run. Demolition trucks are now stationed in the parking lot, signaling the imminent commencement of the gutting and demolition process.

As of May 14, 2025 the main structure of the building has been demolished and is being redeveloped into a 12 building complex called "Swatara Exchange" with retail, offices and restaurants on the newly cleared site.
