= Middletown station (Pennsylvania) =

Amtrak rail station in Middletown, Pennsylvania, USA

Middletown, PA
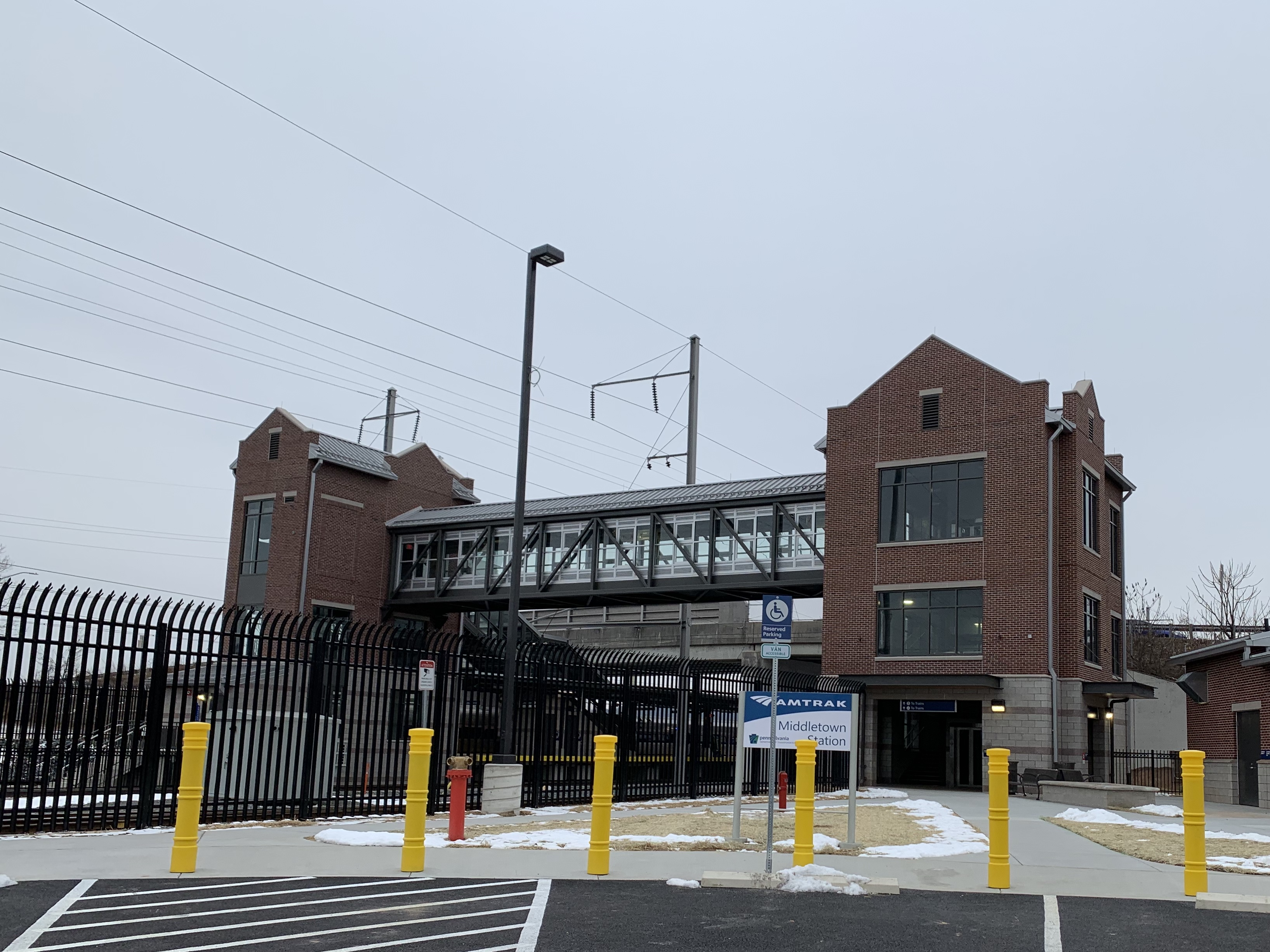
- The new Middletown station in January 2022.

General information
- Location: 270 West Emaus Street; Middletown, Pennsylvania; United States
- Coordinates: 40.196144°N 76.738944°W
- Owner: Amtrak
- Line: Amtrak Philadelphia to Harrisburg Main Line (Keystone Corridor)
- Platforms: 1 island platform
- Tracks: 3
- Connections: CAT: 7

Construction
- Parking: Yes
- Accessible: Yes

Other information
- Station code: Amtrak: MID

History
- Rebuilt: 1990; January 10, 2022
- Electrified: January 15, 1938

Passengers
- FY 2025: 66,252 (Amtrak)

Services
Preceding station	Amtrak	Following station
Harrisburg Terminus	Keystone Service	Elizabethtown toward New York
Pennsylvanian does not stop here
Former services
Preceding station	Pennsylvania Railroad	Following station
Highspire toward Chicago	Main Line	Royalton toward New York or Exchange Place
Location

Middletown station is an Amtrak train station on the Keystone Corridor in Middletown, Dauphin County in the U.S. state of Pennsylvania. The station is served by Amtrak's Keystone Service between New York City and Harrisburg. The former low-level station was built in 1990, but a relocated station with a high-level platform opened on January 10, 2022.

== Services and facilities ==
The Middletown station is located at 270 West Emaus Street. In addition to being used by residents of Middletown, the station is also popular with commuters heading to Harrisburg and Philadelphia, where it was previously free to park. It sees twenty-three arrivals by the Keystone Service on weekdays, thirteen from both Harrisburg and New York Penn Station, and seven from each on weekends. The station is 10 miles (16.1 km) east of Harrisburg, 94 miles (151 km) west of 30th Street Station in Philadelphia, and 185 miles (298 km) from New York. In fiscal year 2018, the station saw a ridership of 68,022 passengers, a decrease of 0.2 percent from the previous year.

The station consists of a high-level center platform with a covering and seating, with a bridge over the tracks providing access to the platform. As the Middletown station is unstaffed, all tickets from the station need to be pre-paid, or purchased from a conductor on board the train. Capital Area Transit's Route 7 transit bus passes near the station on its route between Middletown, Harrisburg International Airport, and downtown Harrisburg.

== History ==
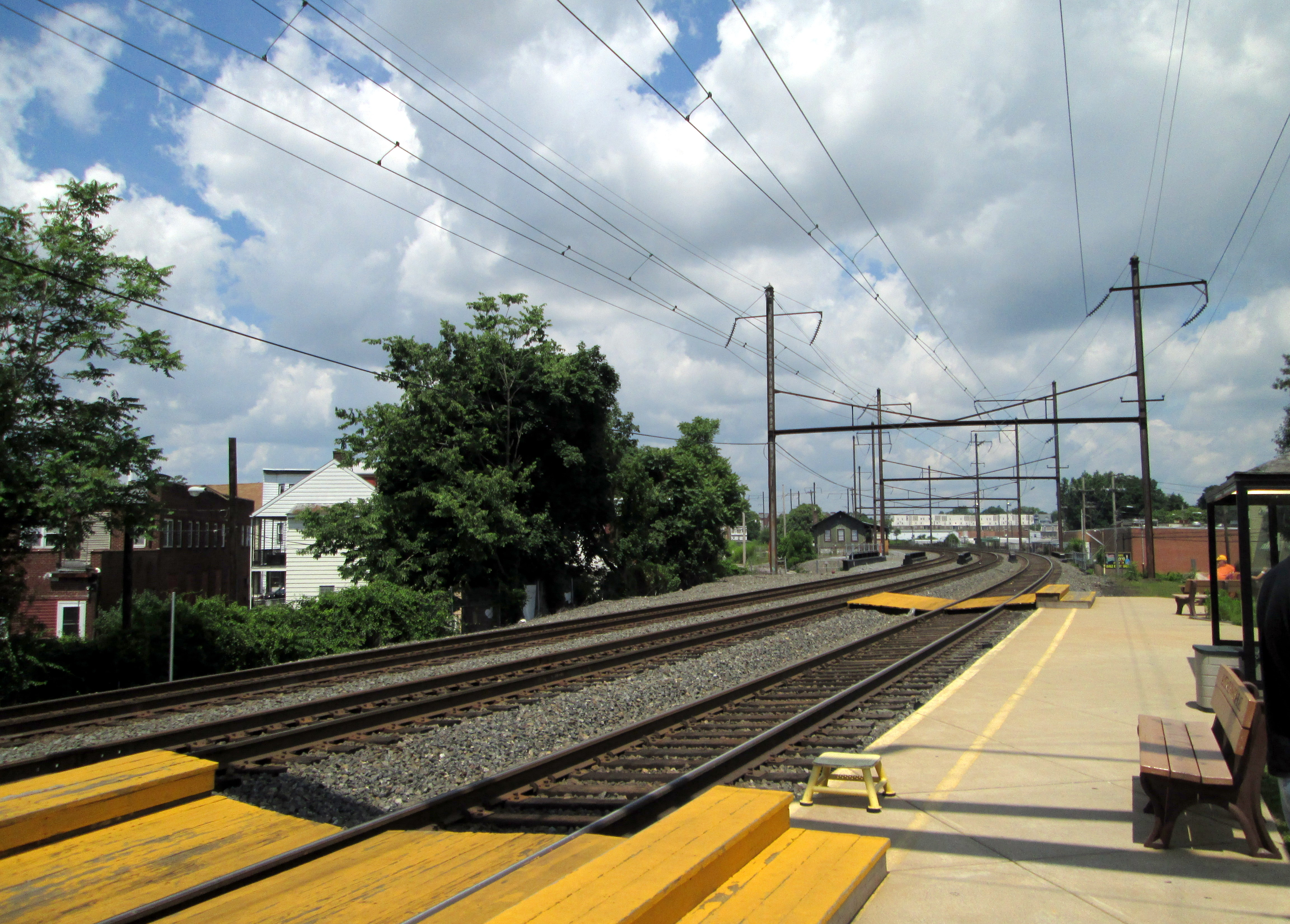
The former low-level Middletown station in June 2013

A railroad was first laid through Middletown in 1836 by the Harrisburg, Portsmouth, Mount Joy and Lancaster Railroad, which was taken over by the Pennsylvania Railroad in 1850. Only a bare platform was available until brick station was built in 1902. It was demolished in the 1970s. Prior to the introduction of the Keystone Service in 1981, Middletown was served by the Big Apple, the Silverliner Service, and the Keystone. A shelter and concrete platform was built in 1990 by Amtrak. From 1991 to 1995, the Atlantic City Express served the station on weekends.

=== Relocation ===
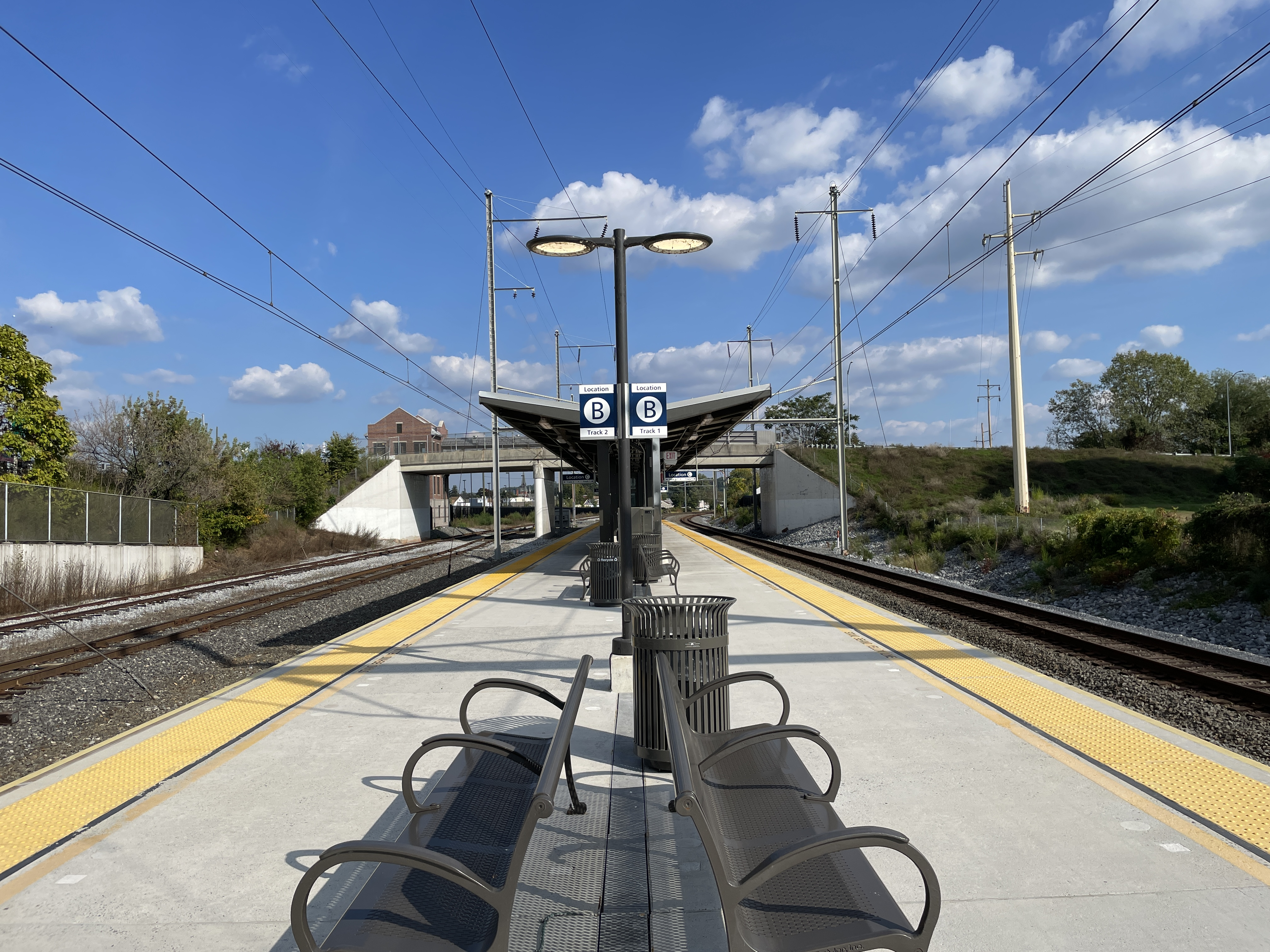
Middletown station in October 2023

The Middletown station was in need of being relocated because it was on a superelevated curve and did not comply with the Americans with Disabilities Act of 1990 as well. It was moved from its previous location at Union and Mill streets to a location at Ann Street and Pennsylvania Route 230, between the former station and Harrisburg International Airport. Initial plans called for the station to be moved next to the airport terminal, but this was rejected in favor of keeping the station in the downtown area. By 2013, it was expected to be completed by 2015 and estimated to cost $32 million. Funding would be provided by the Federal Transit Administration and the Pennsylvania Department of Transportation (PennDOT).

As of May 2016, bidding for site clearing was expected to take place in mid-2016, with the new station opening in 2018. The work includes pedestrian bridges to the platform and over Route 230, and an extension of West Emaus Street to Route 230. By early 2018, the projected opening was delayed to 2022 due to delays with Norfolk Southern and Amtrak relocating their tracks. Despite an August 2021 projection, the station opened on January 10, 2022. A ribbon-cutting ceremony was held on January 18, 2022, with federal, state, and local officials along with Amtrak and PennDOT personnel in attendance.
