= Capital Area Transit (Harrisburg) =

Public transportation agency in Harrisburg, Pennsylvania

rabbittransit Capital Region

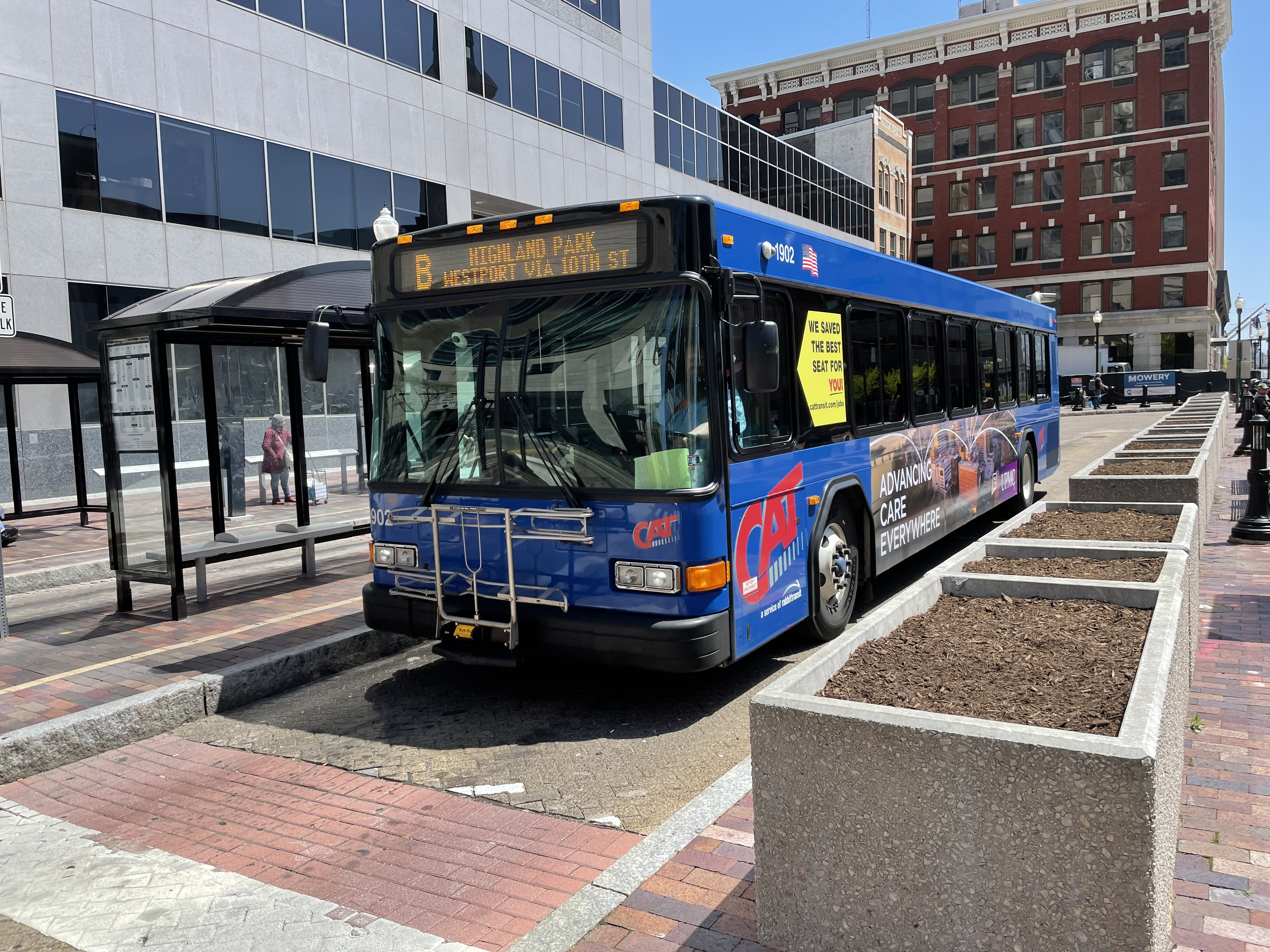
- CAT bus 1902 at the Market Square Transfer Center in Harrisburg on the Route B line
- Founded: 1973
- Headquarters: 901 North Cameron Street
- Locale: Harrisburg, Pennsylvania, U.S.
- Service area: Southern half of Dauphin County and the eastern half of Cumberland County and into northern York County
- Service type: bus service, paratransit
- Routes: 32
- Fleet: 87 buses, 16 paratransit vehicles
- Annual ridership: 1,200,800 (2024)
- Website: www.rabbittransit.org

rabbittransit Capital Region, formerly known as Capital Area Transit (CAT), is a public transportation agency that operates bus and paratransit service in the Harrisburg–Carlisle metropolitan statistical area and the York metropolitan statistical area. Its scheduled route bus service covers much of the southern half of Dauphin County and the eastern half of Cumberland County. It also operates one bus route into northern York County. CAT's shared ride/paratransit operations serve residents throughout Dauphin County. In 2024, the system had a ridership of 1,200,800.

rabbittransit Capital Region employs approximately 200 people and its management headquarters and bus maintenance facility are both located at 901 North Cameron Street in Harrisburg. rabbittransit Capital Region’s parent agency, rabbittransit is based in York, Pa and operates fixed route bus service, paratransit, and microtransit in the York, Gettysburg, Chambersburg, and Hanover areas of South-Central Pennsylvania. rabbittransit’s headquarters is located at 415 Zarfoss Drive, York, Pennsylvania.

== History ==
The Cumberland-Dauphin-Harrisburg Transit Authority was formed in 1973 after the dissolution of the Harrisburg Railways Company. When that company ceased operations, the city of Harrisburg and Cumberland and Dauphin counties formed the authority to ensure mass transit services would continue to be available in the Harrisburg–Carlisle metropolitan statistical area. Pennsylvania’s Municipal Authorities Act of 1945 permitted the city and counties to undertake the action to create CAT.

The Authority is governed by a seven member Board of Directors. Three are appointed by the city of Harrisburg, two are selected by Dauphin County, and two are chosen by Cumberland County. Each board member serves a five year term (at which time they may be reappointed by their respective municipalities). The Board meets each month on the last Wednesday to set policy and provide guidance to the staff. Committees of the Board meet on an ad-hoc basis dependent upon the activity occurring within the Authority.

CAT currently has two divisions – a Fixed Route Bus Division and a Shared Ride/Paratransit Division. A third division for commuter rail is currently being developed.

On December 22, 2020, it was announced that CAT and rabbittransit would merge to form the Susquehanna Regional Transportation Authority. The merger was proposed in order for better service and to prevent CAT service cuts. The merged system will use the rabbittransit name. The CAT branding continues to be used on buses, with a sticker underneath the CAT logo saying "a service of rabbittransit."

== Bus fleet ==
CAT owns a fleet of 87 fixed route buses. The fleet includes eleven 35 foot buses, twenty-one 29 foot buses, and fifty-five 40 foot low floor buses. CAT's buses followed a three digit numbering scheme until 1994. Buses bought in 1995 are numbered to show their year of acquisition (95) in the first two digits. Starting in 2001, all CAT buses ordered that year or later show the year in the second digit of the bus number. CAT's active fleet roster is shown below.

Fleet number(s)	Year	Manufacturer	Model	Powertrain		Notes	Source
1821-1823	2001	New Flyer	D60LF	Cummins ISL	Allison B500R	Formerly OCTA	
2607-2611	2006	Gillig	Low Floor 40'	Cummins ISM	Allison B500R		
2612-2625	2007	Gillig	Low Floor 40'	Cummins ISM	Allison B500R	2006 model	
2701	2007	Gillig	Low Floor BRT 40'	Cummins ISM	Allison B500R	Formerly rabbittransit 420	
2801-2802	2008	Gillig	Low Floor 40'	Cummins ISM	Allison B500R	Suburban configuration	
2803-2806	2008	Gillig	Low Floor 40'	Cummins ISM	Allison B500R		
1001–1002	2011	MCI	D4500CT	Detroit Diesel Series 60 EGR	Allison B500R	Used for commuter routes	
1101–1111	2011	Gillig	Low Floor HEV 40'	Cummins ISL9	Allison H 40 EP hybrid system		
1112	2011	Gillig	Low Floor 29'	Cummins ISL9	Allison B400R	Used for Raider Regional Transit	
1201–1207	2012	Gillig	Low Floor 35'	Cummins ISL9	Allison B400R		
1301–1307	2013	Gillig	Low Floor 40'	Cummins ISL9	Allison B500R		
1401–1404	2014	Gillig	Low Floor 40'	Cummins ISL9	Voith D864.5		
1405–1406	2014	Gillig	Low Floor 29'	Cummins ISL9	Voith D864.5	Used for Raider Regional Transit	
1601–1604	2016	Gillig	Low Floor 40'	Cummins ISL9	Voith D864.5		
1701–1709	2017	Gillig	Low Floor 35'	Cummins L9	Voith D864.6		
1901–1914	2019	Gillig	Low Floor 40'	Cummins L9	Voith D864.6	1901-1905 are suburban configured	
2101-2112	2021	Gillig	Low Floor 40'	Cummins L9	Voith D864.6	2101-2102 are suburban configured	
2113-2115	2021	Gillig	Low Floor 29'	Cummins L9	Voith D864.6	Used for Raider Regional Transit	

== Transportation network ==
As of October 2020, CAT operates 32 bus routes in its fixed route network. These include short distance shuttle routes, longer distance, rush hour express routes, and regular, intermediate length routes. Nearly all the routes are organized into a hub and spoke system centered on Downtown Harrisburg. The hub in the system is the CAT Transfer Center, located at the southeast corner of the intersection of 2nd Street and Market Street in Harrisburg's Market Square.

CAT routes have either a number or letter and route name assigned to distinguish individual routes. Generally speaking, numbered routes operate in the Harrisburg "East Shore" area in Dauphin County, while lettered routes operate across the Susquehanna River in the Harrisburg "West Shore" area in Cumberland County. Many routes operate Monday through Saturday, though some only operate Monday through Friday during rush hours. None of CAT's fixed routes operate on Sundays; however the shared ride division does provide rides seven days a week. Many routes only operate over a portion of the route for certain runs.

=== Local routes ===
The following routes provide local bus service, with all routes serving Downtown Harrisburg:

Route	Line Name	Terminals		Places Served	Notes
1	Market Street	Transfer Center in Downtown Harrisburg	Kline Village (Giant)	Harrisburg Train Station, Market Street, Hale Avenue, Rudy Road	operates Monday-Saturday
2	ROC/Capital Complex Shuttle	Transfer Center in Downtown Harrisburg	Riverfront Office Complex	Harrisburg Train Station, Pennsylvania State Capitol, Harrisburg Train Station	operates Monday-Friday
3	Third Street	Transfer Center in Downtown Harrisburg	Uptown Plaza or 2nd Street and Linglestown Road	Harrisburg Train Station, 3rd Street, Uptown Plaza	operates Monday-Saturday
3/6	Night Loop	Transfer Center in Downtown Harrisburg	Transfer Center in Downtown Harrisburg	Harrisburg Train Station, 6th Street, Uptown Plaza, 3rd Street	operates Monday-Saturday, evening combination of Route 3 and Route 6 service
6/13	Sixth Street/Thirteenth Street	Uptown Plaza	Harrisburg Mall	Harrisburg Train Station, 6th Street, Harrisburg Train Station, Transfer Center in Downtown Harrisburg, Harrisburg Train Station, 13th Street, Paxton Street, Spring Creek Health Center (limited weekday service)	operates Monday-Saturday
7	Middletown	7th and Basin (PHEAA) or Transfer Center in Downtown Harrisburg	Mid-Town Plaza (Giant)	Harrisburg Train Station, Cameron Street, Pennsylvania Route 230, Steelton, Highspire, Harrisburg International Airport, Middletown, Penn State Harrisburg	operates Monday-Saturday, weekday peak hour service to 7th and Basin (PHEAA)
8	Derry/Rutherford	Transfer Center in Downtown Harrisburg	Walmart (Grayson Road), Rutherford Square, or Rutherford Park Apartments	Harrisburg Train Station, Derry Street, Harrisburg Mall (Saturday only), Fresh Express (weekday only), Walmart (Grayson Road), Rutherford Square	operates Monday-Saturday, limited weekday service to Rutherford Square and Rutherford Park Apartments
9	Cameron Street/HACC	Transfer Center in Downtown Harrisburg	Harrisburg Area Community College or Capital Blue Cross	Harrisburg Train Station, Cameron Street, DGS Complex (peak hours only), Farm Show Complex, Harrisburg Area Community College	operates Monday-Friday, peak hour service to Capital Blue Cross
12	Colonial Park	Transfer Center in Downtown Harrisburg	Paxton Towne Center (Target), Gateway Corporate Center, or Linglestown Square	Harrisburg Train Station, State Street, Walnut Street, U.S. Route 22, Colonial Park Mall, Giant, Colonial Commons Paxton Towne Center (Target), Gateway Corporate Center (weekday peak hours only)	operates Monday-Saturday, limited weekday service to Gateway Corporate Center and Linglestown Square
14	Springford/Union Deposit	Transfer Center in Downtown Harrisburg	Springford Apartments	Harrisburg Train Station, Market Street, Union Deposit Road, Walnut Crossing Apartments, Union Square, Point Mall (Giant), Twin Lakes Apartments, Four Seasons Apartments, Pennswood Apartments	operates Monday-Friday, peak hour service
17	Union Deposit/Hamilton Health Center	Transfer Center in Downtown Harrisburg	Point Mall (Giant)	Harrisburg Train Station, State Street, 17th Street, Hamilton Health Center, Berryhill Street, Kline Village (Giant), Union Deposit Road, Union Square Shopping Center, Osteopathic Hospital	operates Monday-Saturday
19	Steelton	Transfer Center in Downtown Harrisburg	Harrisburg Mall	Harrisburg Train Station, Derry Street, 19th Street, Juvenile Center, Steelton, Hoy Towers	operates Monday-Saturday
20	High Pointe Commons	Transfer Center in Downtown Harrisburg	High Pointe Commons	Harrisburg Train Station, Derry Street, Harrisburg Mall, TecPort Business Center, McDonald's	operates Monday-Saturday
39	Herr Street/Blue Mountain Commons	Transfer Center in Downtown Harrisburg	Blue Mountain Commons	Harrisburg Train Station, Herr Street, Progress Avenue, Whisperwood Apartments (weekday peak hours only), Comcast (weekday peak hours only)	operates Monday-Saturday, formerly Route 18
114	East Shore Grocery Shopper	Latsha Towers Linden Terrace Apartments	Kline Village (Giant)	Hoy Towers, Bistline Apartments Presbyterian Apartments, B'Nai B'Rith Apartments, Morrison Towers	operates Thursday, first trip operates from Latsha Towers to Kline Village (Giant), second trip operates from Linden Terrace Apartments to Kline Village (Giant)
322	Hershey/Hummelstown	7th and Basin (PHEAA) or Transfer Center in Downtown Harrisburg	Tanger Outlets Hershey	Harrisburg Train Station, Derry Street, Hummelstown Park & Ride, Hummelstown, Hershey Square (Weis), Penn State Milton S. Hershey Medical Center, Hershey	operates Monday-Friday, peak hour service to 7th and Basin (PHEAA)
A	New Cumberland	7th and Basin (PHEAA) or Transfer Center in Downtown Harrisburg	Fairview Plaza, Capital City Airport, or New Cumberland Defense Depot	Harrisburg Train Station, Transfer Center in Downtown Harrisburg, Lemoyne, New Cumberland, Fairview Plaza, Capital City Airport	operates Monday-Friday, peak hour service, limited service to 7th and Basin (PHEAA), Capital City Airport and New Cumberland Defense Depot
AB	Upper Allen Business Park	Park Run Apartments	Abacus	Steelton, Juvenile Center, 13th Street, Downtown Harrisburg	operates Monday-Friday, peak hour service
B	Highland Park/Westport	7th and Basin (PHEAA) or Transfer Center in Downtown Harrisburg	Westport	Harrisburg Train Station, Transfer Center in Downtown Harrisburg, Lemoyne, Gettysburg Road, Shiremanstown, Weis Market, Encompass Health, Upper Allen Business Park, Rossmoyne Business Center	operates Monday-Friday, peak hour service to 7th and Basin (PHEAA)
C	Carlisle	7th and Basin (PHEAA) or Transfer Center in Downtown Harrisburg	Carlisle Commons Walmart	Harrisburg Train Station, Transfer Center in Downtown Harrisburg, Lemoyne, West Shore Plaza, Camp Hill, Camp Hill Mall (Barnes & Noble), U.S. Route 11, Hogestown, New Kingstown, Carlisle	operates Monday-Friday, peak hour service to 7th and Basin (PHEAA)
D	Erford Road/Capital City Mall	7th and Basin (PHEAA) or Transfer Center in Downtown Harrisburg	Capital City Mall	Harrisburg Train Station, Transfer Center in Downtown Harrisburg, Wormleysburg, Susquehanna View Apartments, Highmark Blue Shield (weekday peak hours only), Holy Spirit Hospital, Camp Hill Mall (Barnes & Noble), Walmart	operates Monday-Saturday, weekday peak hour service to 7th and Basin (PHEAA)
E	Simpson Ferry Road/Mechanicsburg	7th and Basin (PHEAA)	Rutter's in Mechanicsburg	Harrisburg Train Station, Transfer Center in Downtown Harrisburg, Lemoyne, Shiremanstown, Weis Market, Mechanicsburg	operates Monday-Friday, peak hour service
F	Enola	Transfer Center in Downtown Harrisburg	College Hill and B or Giant Food	Enola, Shady Lane Olympic Skating Park & Ride, College Hill & B, Pennsylvania Route 944, West Shore Hospital	operates Monday-Friday, peak hour service, limited service to Giant Food
M	Mechanicsburg	7th and Basin (PHEAA) or Transfer Center in Downtown Harrisburg	Rutter's in Mechanicsburg	Harrisburg Train Station, Transfer Center in Downtown Harrisburg, Lemoyne, West Shore Plaza, Camp Hill, Camp Hill Mall (Barnes & Noble), Pennsylvania Route 641, Arnold Logistics (weekday peak hours only), Naval Support Activity Mechanicsburg (weekday peak hours only), Mechanicsburg	operates Monday-Saturday, weekday peak hour service to 7th and Basin (PHEAA)
W	Allen Road Warehouses	Front & Swatara in Steelton	Amazon	13th Street, Transfer Center in Downtown Harrisburg, Harrisburg Train Station, Downtown Harrisburg, 6th Street, Interstate 81, Ross Stores Distribution Center	operates Monday-Friday, peak hour service
HP	Hersheypark	Harrisburg Train Station	Hotel Hershey	Derry Street, Hummelstown, Hershey, Tanger Outlets Hershey, Hersheypark	operates Monday-Saturday, seasonal service from May to September

=== Commuter routes ===
The following routes provide commuter bus service, operating during weekday peak hours to and from Harrisburg:

Route	Line Name	Terminals		Places Served	Notes
23X	Elizabethville/Millersburg/Halifax and Harrisburg	Elizabethville or Millersburg	Market & River in Harrisburg	Millersburg, Halifax, Clarks Ferry, Dauphin, 7th and Basin (PHEAA), Pennsylvania State Capitol	operates Monday-Friday, peak hour service, limited service to Elizabethville
81X	Shippensburg/Newville/Carlisle and Harrisburg	Shippensburg or Carlisle	Transfer Center in Downtown Harrisburg	Newville, Carlisle, 7th and Basin (PHEAA), Pennsylvania State Capitol, Harrisburg Train Station	operates Monday-Friday, peak hour service, limited service to Newville and Shippensburg

=== Raider Regional Transit ===
CAT operates Raider Regional Transit, which provides service to Shippensburg University of Pennsylvania and Shippensburg.

Route	Places Served	Notes
Blue Line	East King & Queen, Madison Apartments, McDonald's/Sheetz, Bard Townhouses, Shippensburg University of Pennsylvania, Episcopal Square, Turkey Hill, Shippensburg Cottages, Giant, Aldi, Walmart, CVS	operates Monday-Friday, loop route
Red Line	East King & Queen, King Street, Roxbury Ridge Apartments, Bard Townhouses, College Park Commons, Hot Point Commons, Creekside Court Apartments, Shippensburg University of Pennsylvania, Aldi, Walmart, CVS	operates Monday-Friday, loop route
White Line	A route: East King & Queen, Madison Apartments, McDonald's/Sheetz, Bard Townhouses, Stone Ridge, Hot Point Commons, Creekside Apartments, Shippensburg University of Pennsylvania, Episcopal Square, Turkey Hill, Chambersburg Square in Chambersburg B route: East King & Queen, Madison Apartments, McDonald's/Sheetz, Bard Townhouses, Stone Ridge, Hot Point Commons, Creekside Apartments, Shippensburg University of Pennsylvania, Shippensburg Cottages, Giant, Aldi, Walmart, CVS	operates Saturday, loop route, A route operates between Shippensburg and Chambersburg, B route operates within Shippensburg

== Funding ==
CAT has about a 35% farebox recovery ratio. The remainder of the operational funds to provide service as well as capital funds comes from Cumberland and Dauphin Counties, the City of Harrisburg, and Pennsylvania Department of Transportation. Additional funding for capital expenditures is received from the Federal Transit Administration.

== Connecting services ==
Essentially all of CAT's East Shore routes and many of their West Shore routes stop within one block of the Harrisburg Transportation Center, the primary intercity passenger rail and bus hub in the greater Harrisburg area. Transportation operators who currently provide service at the HTC include Amtrak, Greyhound Lines, Capitol Trailways, and Fullington Trailways. In addition, CAT's Route 7 (Middletown) stops within one block of the Middletown Amtrak station and the Route 322 (Hershey) shares multiple stops in Hershey with Capitol Trailways' Harrisburg/Reading route.

All of CAT's routes excluding the Route 81 – Shippensburg/Naval Base and Route L – Lemoyne Shuttle routes have shared stops in downtown Harrisburg with the Rabbit Transit York/Harrisburg commuter bus route, the RabbitEXPRESS. Rabbit Transit is CAT's counterpart public transit agency in York County.

Most of CAT's routes also connect at multiple locations in downtown Harrisburg with rush hour, commuter bus routes operated by R & J Transportation. R & J Transportation runs two Schuylkill County/Harrisburg routes.

In Hershey, the Route 322 connects with selected bus routes within the County of Lebanon Transit Authority or COLT system. COLT is the transit provider in Lebanon County. Connecting routes include COLT's Route 8, which connects with the CAT Route 322 at Tanger Outlets Hershey and COLT's Route 18, which shares stops with the Route 322 at various locations within the village of Hershey and at the Penn State Hershey Medical Center. COLT also has "Twilight Run", evening service on the Route 8 that connects with CAT's Hershey route.

Finally, the Route 7 (Middletown) stops on some of its runs at Harrisburg International Airport, the primary commercial service airport in South Central Pennsylvania. Most major U.S. passenger airlines, excluding dedicated low-cost carriers, have flights to/from HIA.

== Proposed commuter rail services ==
=== Capital Red Rose Corridor (Corridor One) ===
In late 1999, CAT's board of directors voted unanimously to pursue the vision of bringing commuter rail to the Harrisburg metropolitan area. The project, initially named CorridorOne, will provide regional rail service along existing rail facilities within the lower Susquehanna Valley, linking Lancaster with Harrisburg. Original planning of the corridor would have extended service along a 54-mile stretch between Lancaster, Harrisburg and Carlisle, Cumberland County; however, the Harrisburg to Carlisle segment was dropped from the proposal in 2005.

==== Project schedule ====
- Preliminary engineering and environmental studies phase – completed August 2006
- Final engineering design phase – est. 2009
- Construction phase – complete late 2010 (est.)
- Lancaster to Harrisburg service – operational late 2010 (est.)

=== Corridor Two ===
CAT and the Modern Transit Partnership began discussing a second commuter rail corridor in 2009, designated Corridor Two. Corridor Two would operate between York, Harrisburg, and Lebanon. There may be difficulties implementing the Harrisburg-Lebanon segment of CorridorTwo, as this segment would operate on the heavily traveled and fast-growing Norfolk Southern Harrisburg Line, an east–west trunk line in Norfolk Southern's freight rail system. Norfolk Southern has discussed upgrading and potentially expanding capacity of the Harrisburg-Lebanon segment of their system for freight rail operations as part of their Crescent Corridor initiative between the U.S. Gulf Coast and northern New Jersey.

== Park-and-ride locations ==
- Carlisle Commons (Routes C, CX, 81N)
- City Island (Routes 2, A, B, C, D, K, M, MA)
- Clarks Ferry (Middle Paxton Township) (Route 23)
- Colonial Park Mall (Lower Paxton Township) ) (Route 12)
- Dillsburg Bon-Ton (Routes B, 120)
- Dauphin (Route 23)
- Elizabethville Wal-Mart (Route 23)
- Fairview Plaza (New Cumberland) (Route A)
- Harrisburg Mall (Swatara Township) (Routes 8, 13, 19, 20)
- Hershey Intermodal Center (Derry Township) (Route 322)
- Hershey Outlets (Derry Township)(Route 322)
- Linglestown Amelia's Grocery (Lower Paxton Township) (Route 12)
- Linglestown K-Mart (Lower Paxton Township) (Route 12)
- Mechanicsburg K-Mart (Routes C, 81S)
- Mechanicsburg Weis Market (Route MX)
- Newville (Routes 81N, 82S)
- Old Dillsburg Middle School (Route 120)
- Olympic Skating Center (East Pennsboro Township) (Route F)
- Point Mall (South Hanover Township) (Routes 14, 15)
- Shippensburg Wal-Mart (Routes 81N, 82S)
- Winding Hill Rd (Upper Allen Township) (Route 120)
