= Rabbittransit =

Public transportation authority serving York, Pennsylvania

Susquehanna Regional Transportation Authority (rabbittransit)

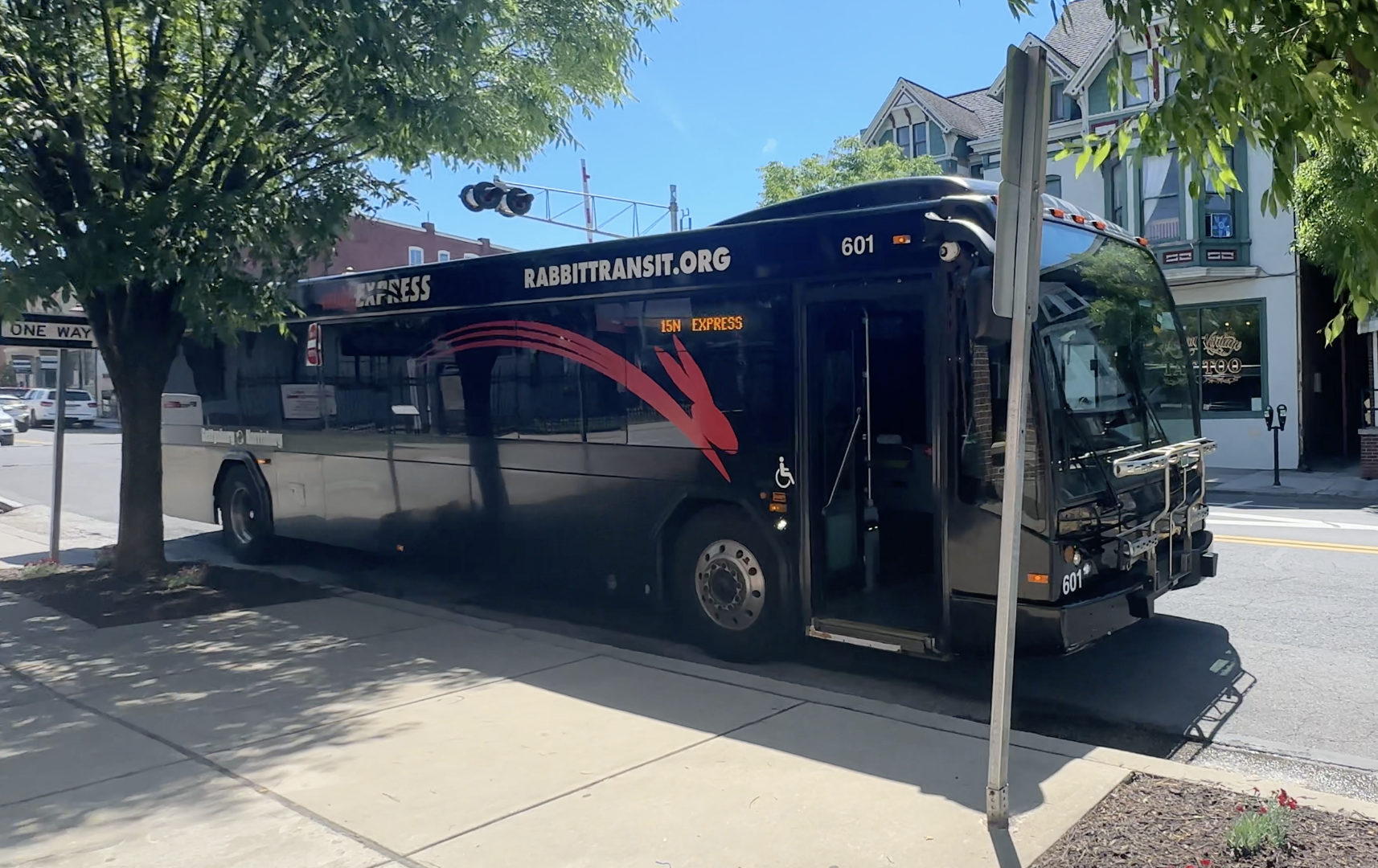
- A Rabbit Transit Express Bus Departing from Gettysburg.
- Headquarters: 415 North Zarfoss Drive, York, PA
- Locale: York; Gettysburg
- Service area: York County, Pennsylvania; Adams County, Pennsylvania
- Service type: bus service, paratransit
- Routes: 15 regular 1 shuttle 2 connector
- Fleet: 80
- Daily ridership: 6,000
- Website: rabbittransit.org

The Susquehanna Regional Transportation Authority (formerly Central Pennsylvania Transportation Authority (formerly York Adams Transportation Authority)), doing business as rabbittransit, is the mass transit service of York and Adams counties in Pennsylvania and oversees the transportation needs of Columbia, Cumberland, Franklin, Montour, Northumberland, Perry, Snyder and Union counties. The agency currently operates 15 fixed routes within York County (12 in York and 3 in Hanover) and 4 routes in Adams County (all of which serve Gettysburg), express bus routes from Gettysburg to Harrisburg and from York to Harrisburg and Towson, Maryland (connecting to the Baltimore Light RailLink of the Baltimore area's Maryland Transit Administration).

The agency, which has an annual ridership of 1.7 million, also provides paratransit services to the disabled, and a shared ride service.

== History ==
rabbittransit bus in East York

rabbittransit was formerly known as York County Transit Authority. The name was changed in 2000 in order to improve the agency's image. The name is a play of "rapid transit", coincidentally echoing the same play-on-words that formed the basis of the cartoon Rabbit Transit. During the late 2000s, rabbittransit benefited from high gas prices and saw an increase in ridership. Ridership rose on express routes in particular, including the one operating between York and Harrisburg.

On June 6, 2011, rabbittransit (in cooperation with the Adams County Transit Authority) began operating commuter service between Gettysburg and Harrisburg with a total of four round-trips daily. The route is designated "15N".

On July 1, 2016, rabbittransit (in cooperation with Union/Snyder County Commissioners) merged with Union/Snyder Transportation Alliance (USTA).

=== Merger with Capital Area Transit ===
On December 22, 2020, rabbittransit announced that it would merge with Capital Area Transit (CAT), which offers service in Dauphin and Cumberland counties, to form the Susquehanna Regional Transportation Authority. The merger was proposed in order for better service and to prevent CAT service cuts. The merged system will use the rabbittransit name. The CAT branding continues to be used on CAT buses, with a sticker underneath the CAT logo saying "a service of rabbittransit."

== Routes ==
As of 2026, rabbittransit operates four routes serving Gettysburg, two serving Shippensburg, 19 serving York and Hanover, and several express routes.

Route	Name	Terminals
1E	East York	York Transfer Center	Galleria Mall
1W	West Manchester Town Center	York Transfer Center	West Manchester Town Center
2N	North York Via N George St	York Transfer Center	Crossroads Shopping Center
3N	Northwest Plaza / UPMC Hospital	York Transfer Center	Northwest Plaza / UPMC Hospital
4E	East York via Princess	York Transfer Center	Memorial Outpatient
5E	Haines Rd / Greensprings	York Transfer Center	Greensprings Plaza
5W	West York / West York Ind Park	York Transfer Center	West York
6N	HACC / Manchester Ind Park	York Transfer Center	York City Business & Industrial Park
8S	York Hospital via George	York Transfer Center	York Hospital
9S	York Hospital via Pershing	York Transfer Center	York Hospital
10S	South York Plaza / Red Lion	York Transfer Center	Red Lion
12	Wrightsville/Columbia	East York	Columbia
13	Dover / UPMC Hospital	West Manchester Town Center	Dover
16	York to Hanover	York Transfer Center	Hanover Square
20N	North Hanover via Kindig	Hanover Square	Hanover Crossing
20S	South Hanover via Baltimore	Hanover Square	South Hanover
22N	North Hanover via Randolph	Hanover Square	Hanover Crossing
32	Apple Hill Shuttle	York Hospital	Apple Hill Medical Center
33	Industrial Park Shuttle	York	Amazon (Lewisberry)
15N	Gettysburg Express	Gettysburg Transfer Center	Harrisburg Area Community College
83N	Harrisburg Express	York Transfer Center	Harrisburg Area Community College
83S	Northern Maryland Express	York Transfer Center	Towson Commons
LL1	Lincoln Line 1 (Aspire Hotel)	Gettysburg Transfer Center	Gettysburg National Military Park
LL2	Lincoln Line 2 (Outlets)	Gettysburg Transfer Center	Outlets at Gettysburg
BL	Blue Line	Gettysburg Transfer Center	Deatrick Commons
GL	Gray Line	Gettysburg Transfer Center	Gateway Gettysburg
GD	Gold Line	Gettysburg National Military Park	Pennsylvania Memorial
GHC	Gettysburg-Hanover Connector	Gettysburg	Hanover

== See also ==
- Capital Area Transit (Harrisburg)
