= Extreme-ultraviolet Stellar Characterization for Atmospheric Physics and Evolution =

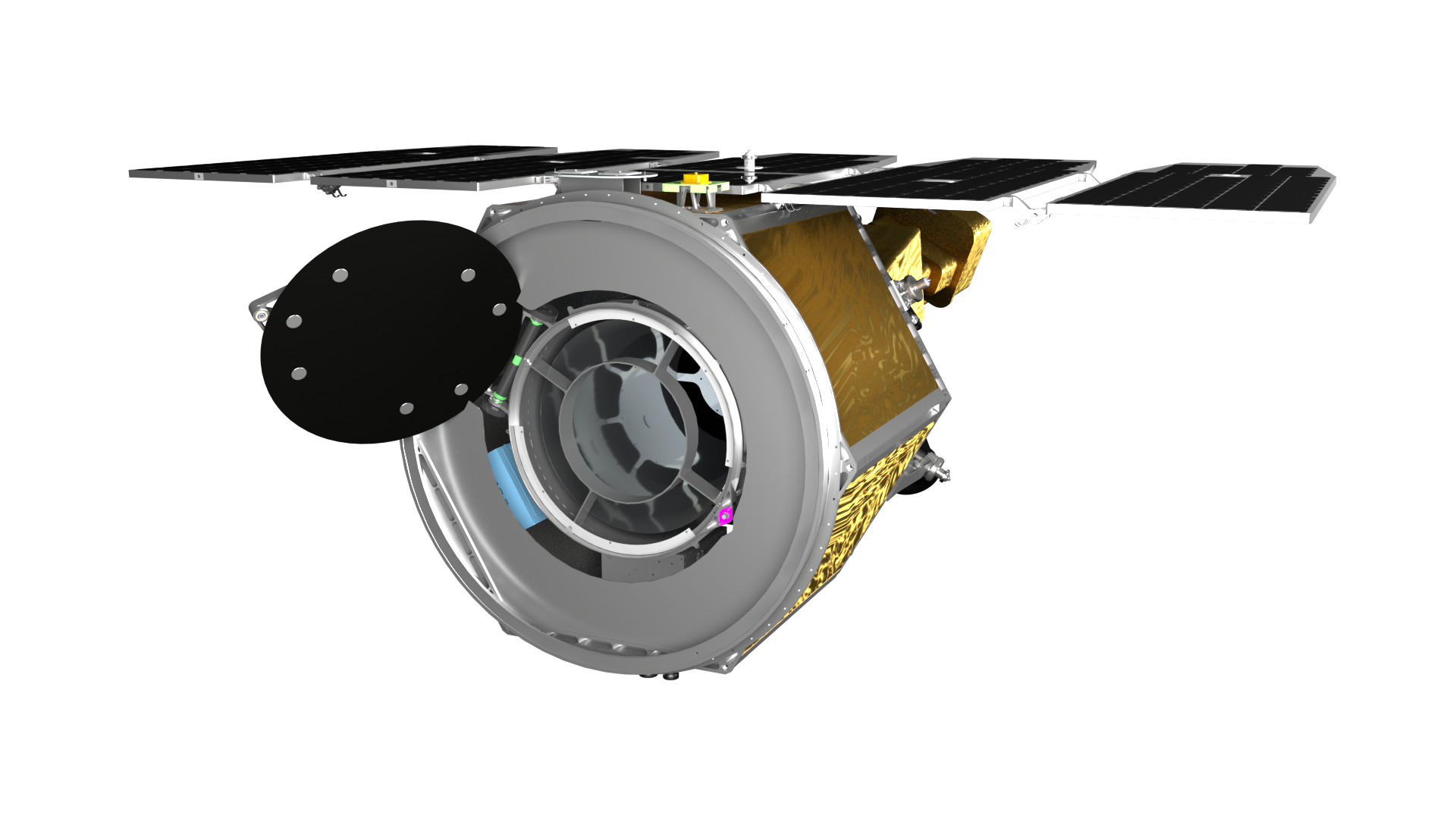
- Render of ESCAPE spacecraft
- Names: ESCAPE
- Mission type: Stellar activity Exoplanet habitability Astronomy
- Operator: NASA
- Mission duration: 2 years (design)

Spacecraft properties
- Bus: BAE Systems Space & Mission Systems' Evolve
- Manufacturer: BAE Systems Space & Mission Systems
- Dry mass: 452.1 kg
- Dimensions: 3.2 m x 1.3 m x 2.7 m
- Power: 275 W

Start of mission
- Launch date: November 2031

Orbital parameters
- Reference system: Low Earth Orbit

Main telescope
- Type: Gregorian telescope, grazing incidence
- Diameter: 0.5 m
- Wavelengths: 80 Å to 825 Å (EUV); 1250 Å to 1650 Å (FUV)

The Extreme-ultraviolet Stellar Characterization for Atmospheric Physics and Evolution (ESCAPE) mission aims to find environments beyond Earth's solar system that might host planets with thick atmospheres to support life.

The long-term stability of exoplanetary atmospheres depends critically on the extreme-ultraviolet (EUV) flux from the host star. The EUV flux likely drives the demographics of the short-period planet population as well the ability for rocky planets to maintain habitable environments long enough for the emergence of life. ESCAPE is an astrophysics Small Explorer proposed to NASA that employs extreme- and far-ultraviolet spectroscopy (80 – 1650 Å) to characterize the high-energy radiation environment in the habitable zones (HZs) around nearby stars.

First proposed to NASA in 2019, ESCAPE was awarded a competitive Phase A concept study in 2020.. ESCAPE was re-proposed to NASA in 2026.

== Mission objective ==
ESCAPE provides the first comprehensive study of the stellar EUV environments that control atmospheric mass-loss and determine the habitability of rocky exoplanets. ESCAPE's prime mission is driven by two spectroscopic surveys: 1) a broad survey of EUV and FUV flux from 300 nearby (d < 100 pc) F, G, K, and M stars, providing direct input into atmospheric evolution models. The mission targets stars with a range of ages and activity levels, and places an emphasis on stars with known exoplanets. 2) A deep monitoring survey (~2 weeks per star) of 24 targets-of-interest to measure the stellar flare frequency distribution and constrain the coronal mass ejection (CME) rate and high-energy particle fluence from these objects. Together, these surveys provide the crucial stellar drivers that regulate habitable environments on planets targeted by current and upcoming atmospheric characterization missions such as the James Webb Space Telescope and the Habitable Worlds Observatory.

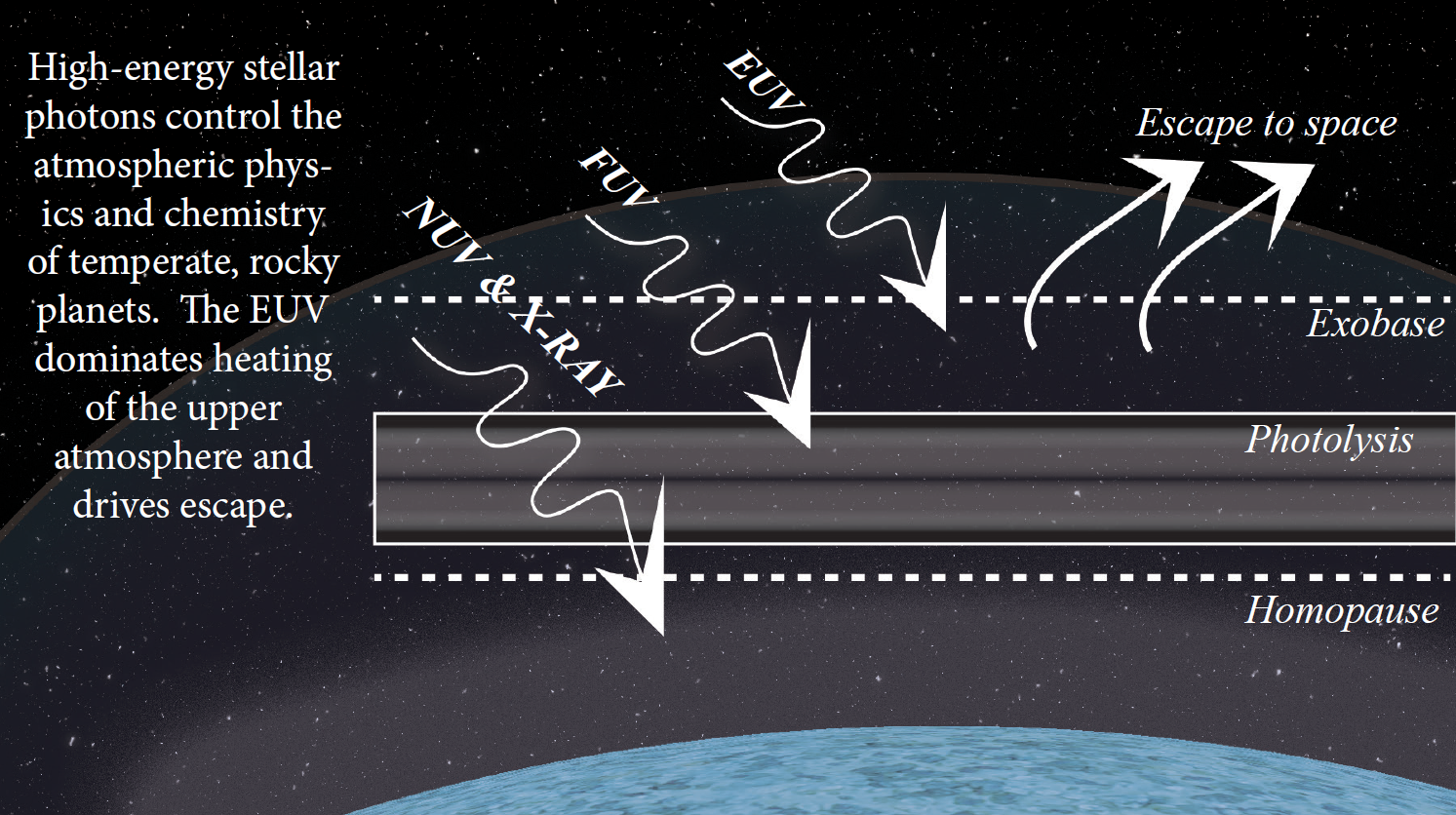
Stellar light drives planetary upper atmospheric chemistry and escape

== Science instrument ==
The ESCAPE Hettrick-Bowyer telescope comprises a grazing-incidence mirror that focus ultraviolet light through a spectral filter, where a secondary mirror module directs light to a set of grazing-incidence gratings and a set of normal-incidence gratings that disperse light as spectra onto the microchannel plate detector. This ultimately results in spectra ranging from 80 Å to 825 Å (EUV) and from 1250 Å to 1650 Å (FUV) with 1 Å resolution. Once downlinked and processed, these measurements will be accessible on Mikulski Archive for Space Telescopes (MAST).

== Construction ==
ESCAPE is being designed and built by several institutions, led by Principal Investigator Kevin France at the Laboratory for Atmospheric and Space Physics (LASP), a research institute at University of Colorado Boulder.

- LASP is responsible for the overall project, instrument design, instrument integration, mission operations, and science data processing.
- BAE Systems Space & Mission Systems provides the spacecraft bus, integrates it with the telescope, and performs spacecraft level environmental testing.
- Media Lario S.r.l. manufactures, assembles, and aligns the grazing incidence mirrors optimized for ESCAPE's observing bandpass.
- Pennsylvania State University provides the custom gratings that disperse incoming light into spectra.
- Sensor Sciences provides the specialized detector.
