= Xscape =

Xscape may refer to:

== Business ==
- Xscape, a chain of arcades owned by Cineplex Entertainment in Canada
- Xscape (building), a chain of indoor ski slope/leisure complexes in the United Kingdom

== Music ==
- Xscape (group), an American/R&B band popular in the 1990s
- Xscape (album), a 2014 album by Michael Jackson

== Other ==
- Xscape Match, a match type in professional wrestling
- X-Scape, a DSiWare game that is the sequel to the 1992 Game Boy game, X

== See also ==
- Escape (disambiguation)
