= The Escape, Pennsylvania =

- Unincorporated community Census designated place
- Location within Pennsylvania Location within the United States
- Coordinates: 41°21′20.3″N 75°18′21.7″W
- Country: United States
- State: Pennsylvania
- County: Pike
- Township: Greene and Palmyra

Area
  - Total: 0.818 sq mi (2.12 km^{2})
  - Land: 0.668 sq mi (1.73 km^{2})
  - Water: 0.15 sq mi (0.39 km^{2})
- Elevation: 1,578 ft (481 m)
- Time zone: UTC-5 (Eastern (EST))
  - Summer (DST): UTC-4 (EDT)
- FIPS code: 42-76432
- GNIS feature ID: 1213059

The Escape is an unincorporated community and census designated place (CDP) in Greene and Palmyra townships, Pike County, in the U.S. state of Pennsylvania.

== Demographics ==
Historical population
Census	Pop.	Note	%±
U.S. Decennial Census

The United States Census Bureau defined The Escape as a census designated place in the 2023 American Community Survey.
