= Escapa =

Escapa is a surname. Notable people with the surname include:

- Amancio Escapa Aparicio (1938–2017), Roman Catholic bishop
- Joseph Escapa (c. 1572–1662), Macedonian rabbi
- Michal Escapa (born 1937), Israeli paralympic multi-sport athlete
