= The Great Escape (Irish TV series) =

- Genre: Documentary
- Created by: Coco Television
- Starring: Numerous couple and families
- Countries of origin: Ireland and various others
- Original language: English
- No. of series: 2
- No. of episodes: 8

Production
- Running time: 60 minutes

Original release
- Release: 2006 – 2009

The Great Escape is an Irish television series broadcast on RTÉ One each Tuesday night at 22:15. It follows Irish families who leave Ireland to travel across the world in search of a better life. Two series have thus far been produced, with each series documenting four families who leave Ireland in search of a better life. The series details how they cope in their new surroundings, without any support from friends or family as they set up businesses, develop new careers, meet new friends and overcome cultural differences. Produced by Coco Television, it has thus far featured Irish families who have relocated to such countries as France, South Africa, Spain (thrice), Australia, Austria and Italy. The second series in 2009 was part of a group of programmes dealing with the topic of emigration. Others included Death or Canada, Blood of the Irish and Who Do You Think You Are?.

== Series one ==
Series one was filmed in 2005 – 2006.

Relocation	Family
(France) Bordeaux	Casserleys
(South Africa) Tulbagh	Pielows
(Spain) Guadalajara	Doyles
(Australia) Ipswich	Whittakers

=== Episode one ===
The Casserley family are Ger, Eimer and their three children, 14-year-old Eoin, 12-year-old Niamh and 10-year-old Ciara. Despite being unable to speak the French language, they moved to Bordeaux, France in 2004. Ger was laid off and, having always dreamed of setting up a Pitch'n Putt style golf course in France, decided then was the best opportunity. They sold their home in Swords, County Dublin. After some travelling they settled near Montpon, a town located about forty minutes from Bordeaux. Their three-bedroom home cost €104,000 and Ger, along with his brother in law, purchased a strip of land nearby in order to develop his golf course. The episode follows the children's struggles with the French language and their father's difficulties in obtaining planning permission for his golf course.

=== Episode two ===
Colin and Teresa Pielow are from Dublin but relocated to South Africa in October 2005 where they set up a small vineyard and opened their own business, Pielows Restaurant. This change came about after the couple holidayed in Tulbagh, a place located one hour and twenty minutes north of Cape Town which they loved very much. They sold the restaurant they owned in Cobh (Robin Hill), rented their Enniskerry cottage and left for South Africa with their two Labrador Retrievers. The Pielows purchased a traditional cape Dutch style house with 1.5 hectares for €220,000 down the street from their new restaurant, part of the well-established guesthouse "De Oude Herberg". They planned to cultivate the land as a vineyard. The Pielows are both trained chefs and have owned and successfully run restaurants and a wine business in the past. This episode details their experiences in the different culture as they manage their restaurant, cultivate their vineyard and produce their own wine.

=== Episode three ===
The Doyles are Mark, his wife Sonia and their two daughters, 13-year-old Rebecca and 3-year-old Ambar are originally from Bray, County Wicklow. In 2005 they moved to the town of Guadalajara, near Madrid in Spain. Sonia is originally from Guadalajara, but was studying English in Bray when she met Mark sixteen years previously. Mark helped run a pub called "Jim Doyles" located on Bray's seafront. After fourteen years together in Bray Mark and Sonia decided to move to Sonia's home town, with Sonia moving first with her daughters to settle them into school life, whilst Mark remained for a time in Bray to overlook the sale of the family home and his share of the business. Sonia's family still live in Guadalajara and the Doyles initially stay with Sonia's parents. By December 2005 Mark is full-time in Spain and the family has moved into a new home.

=== Episode four ===
The Whittakers are Pam and Russell from Knocklyon in Dublin. They witnessed a significant rise in value in their three-bedroom semi-detached home. Pam is a trained hairdresser who managed a local salon, whilst Russell worked as a panel beater in a garage. They have two children, twelve-year-old Ryan and two-year-old Charlotte. A couple of years previously they holidayed in Australia for three months, visiting Pam's only sister, who had already been living there for a number of years. When they returned to Ireland they decided to move to Australia and applied for visas. After two years of red tape, they left Ireland on Saint Patrick's Day in 2006. The Whittakers settled in Ipswich in Queensland forty minutes from Brisbane, where Pam's parents have since retired. Within weeks of arriving Pam and Russell buy a large detached house on stilts by a river with a large garden and Russell obtains a job in a local garage. Pam settles Ryan into a suitable school and spends time with Charlotte, something she was unable to do in Ireland as she was a working mother.

== Series two ==
Series two was broadcast from 13 January – 3 February 2009.

Relocation	Family
(Spain) Marbella	Dankers
(Spain) Dénia	Owens/Darch
Austria	Barrys
Northern Italy	Owens/Davis

=== Episode one ===
The Dankers are stay-at-home mother Suzanne, former antiques dealer Howard and their two young sons from Terenure in Dublin. They moved to Marbella, Spain in July 2007. Suzanne set up a wedding planning business for Irish couples hoping to marry in Spain, whilst Howard hoped to set up his own antiques business. The episode follows their first year in Spain.

=== Episode two ===
Barbara Owens from Knocklyon, Dublin and Welshman Lee Darch are a couple with two young daughters and Barbara has a 17-year-old son, Marti. They managed to sell their Knocklyon home in July 2008 just before the property bubble burst in order to fund their move to Dénia, Spain. Lee is a builder by trade but plans to set up a fishing business in Spain.

=== Episode three ===
Adrian and Michelle Barry from counties Kildare and Cork have been married for two years and left behind a daily commute from Kildare to Dublin and two well-paid jobs in finance and IT to move to Austria in July 2007 where they set up a ski chalet business.

=== Episode four ===
Tarja Owens and Niall Davis from Bray, County Wicklow and Dublin moved to Northern Italy for a six-month trial due to their belief that it would have better mountain cycling training resources. They intend to set up a mountain biking tour business. As professional athletes they do not earn very much and they have short careers. Tarja is helped in her endeavours by local hotel owner Merco but Niall's focus is on training which presents difficulties for Tarja.

== Reaction ==
John Boland of the Irish Independent referred to the Dankers of series two's opening episode as a "charmless couple" he was willing to "hurriedly bypass" in his argument that the BBC had entertained him more than RTÉ.
