= Kevin France =

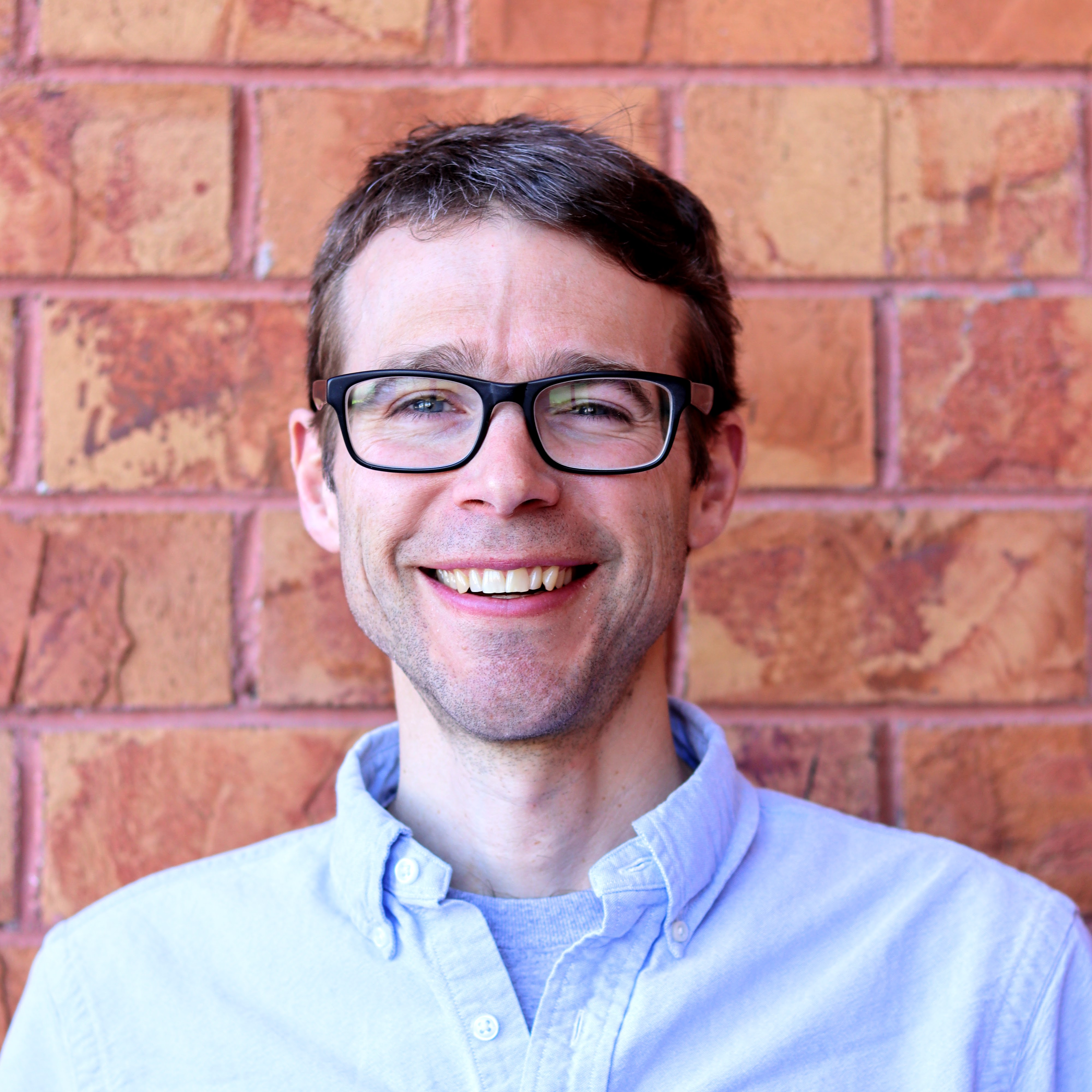
- Born: Kevin Christopher France; Dearborn, Michigan
- Education: Boston University (BA); Johns Hopkins University (PhD)
- Spouse: Emily C. France https://www.emilyfrancebooks.com/
- Scientific career
- Fields: Astrophysics
- Workplaces: University of Colorado Boulder; Canadian Institute for Theoretical Astrophysics
- Thesis: Far-Ultraviolet Molecular Hydrogen Fluorescence in Photodissociation Regions (2006)
- Doctoral advisor: Paul D. Feldman
- Website: www.colorado.edu/aps/kevin-france

Kevin France is an American astrophysicist and professor in the Department of Astrophysical and Planetary Sciences (APS) at the University of Colorado Boulder, where he also serves as Associate Chair for Graduate Studies. His research focuses on ultraviolet spectroscopy of stars and exoplanets, with an emphasis on the role of stellar radiation environments in planetary atmospheres and habitability. France is principal investigator of multiple spaceflight and suborbital programs, including the ESCAPE Small Explorer mission concept and the Colorado Ultraviolet Transit Experiment (CUTE), and has led a series of suborbital sounding rocket missions to study high-energy astrophysical processes. He is also a member of the Habitable Worlds Observatory (HWO) Community Science and Instrument Team.

== Early life and education ==
Kevin France grew up and attended high school in Charleston, West Virginia. He then received a B.A in Physics & Astronomy in 2000 from Boston University. After a few breaks to travel and work for Greenpeace, he earned a Ph.D. at the Johns Hopkins University in Astrophysics in 2006, working with Paul Feldman and Stephan McCandliss. At Johns Hopkins, he was the lead graduate student on two NASA/JHU rocket missions studying the ultraviolet properties of dust and H_{2} in galactic nebulae, a guest observer on NASA's Far-Ultraviolet Spectroscopic Explorer and Spitzer Space Telescope missions, and played drums in an astronomical rock band

== Research and career ==
Following graduate school, France moved to a postdoctoral position at the Canadian Institute for Theoretical Astrophysics before coming to the University of Colorado's Center for Astrophysics and Space Astronomy to join the Instrument Development Team for Hubble Space Telescope's Cosmic Origins Spectrograph (COS) with James Green. He was awarded NASA's Nancy Grace Roman fellowship prior to joining the Department of Astrophysical and Planetary Sciences (APS) faculty at Colorado in 2013. France is presently a professor in APS and a founding member of the Colorado Ultraviolet Spectroscopy Program (CUSP).

France's research centers on the interaction between stars and their planetary systems, particularly through ultraviolet and high-energy radiation. His work has contributed to understanding how stellar activity influences the atmospheres and long-term evolution of exoplanets.

A major focus of his research is the characterization of stellar radiation environments relevant to planetary habitability. His studies of M dwarf stars have examined the role of stellar flares and magnetic activity in shaping the atmospheres of planets orbiting low-mass stars, including investigations of flare rates and ultraviolet emission from older (~10 Gyr) stellar populations.

France has also contributed to studies of the long-term evolution of high-energy radiation from solar-type stars, including work tracing extreme ultraviolet (EUV) emission from young (~10 Myr) to mature (~10 Gyr) stars and its implications for atmospheric loss and chemical evolution on orbiting planets.

He is a co-author on work reporting evidence for coronal mass ejection-like events on other stars, expanding observational constraints on stellar space weather beyond the Solar System.

== Space Missions and Instrumentation ==
In addition to observational studies, France is principal investigator of the ESCAPE (Extreme-ultraviolet Stellar Characterization for Atmospheric Physics and Evolution) Small Explorer mission concept, which is designed to measure the high-energy radiation environments of nearby stars and assess their impact on planetary atmospheres.

He is also principal investigator of the Colorado Ultraviolet Transit Experiment (CUTE), a CubeSat mission designed to observe atmospheric escape from exoplanets through ultraviolet transit spectroscopy.

France has led eight suborbital sounding rocket missions investigating ultraviolet astrophysics and planetary atmospheres. These missions have contributed to the development and validation of instrumentation for future space observatories and have been featured in NASA's High Above Down Under series.

He is also a member of the Habitable Worlds Observatory (HWO) Community Science and Instrument Team, a NASA-led effort to define the science goals and instrumentation for a future flagship mission designed to search for habitable exoplanets. France has developed community-led concepts for ultraviolet science and technology pathfinders for missions like HWO.

== Service and Leadership ==
France has served on multiple science advisory and strategic planning groups related to space-based astrophysics missions. These include:

- Science Advisory Council for the Hubble Space Telescope ULLYSES Director's Discretionary Time program (2019 - 2021)
- STScI Working Group on Exoplanet Science in the HST and JWST era (2023 - 2024)
- Science Advisory Council for the JWST and HST Rocky Worlds Director's Discretionary Time (DDT) program (2024 - present)
- LUVOIR Science and Technology Definition Team (2016 - 2020)
- Habitable Worlds Observatory Science, Technology, Architecture Review Team (START) (2023 - 2024)
- Habitable Worlds Observatory Community Science and Instrument Team (CSIT) (2025 - present)

== Personal life ==
Prof. France lives with his family outside of Boulder, Colorado. His wife, Emily France, is a novelist and lawyer.
