= Great Escape Theatres =

American cinema chain

- Type: Private
- Industry: Motion Picture Exhibition
- Founded: May 1997, Bedford, Indiana United States
- Fate: In-name unit used by Regal Entertainment Group only
- Successor: Regal Entertainment Group
- Headquarters: New Albany, Indiana, United States
- Key people: Anne Ragains, CEO

Great Escape Theatres was a movie-theatre chain that operated movie theatres primarily in the Midwestern United States. The chain had its headquarters in New Albany, Indiana, located just across the Ohio River from Louisville, Kentucky. In November 2012, Alliance Entertainment (parent company of Great Escape) sold its movie theatre portfolio (except for the Princess 4 in Oxford, Ohio) to Regal Entertainment Group.

On 7 September 2022, Cineworld, the current parent company of Great Escape Theatres, filed for Chapter 11 bankruptcy.

== Company history ==
Great Escape Theatres was a private company owned and operated by Alliance Entertainment, which opened its first theatre in Bedford, Indiana, in May 1997. The company continued to further expanded, opening locations in Indiana, Kentucky, Illinois, Ohio, Tennessee, Pennsylvania, West Virginia, Nebraska, Missouri, and Georgia. The location in Fenton Missouri, won Best Theatre in the St. Louis, Missouri area in the July 2009 issue of St. Louis Magazine.

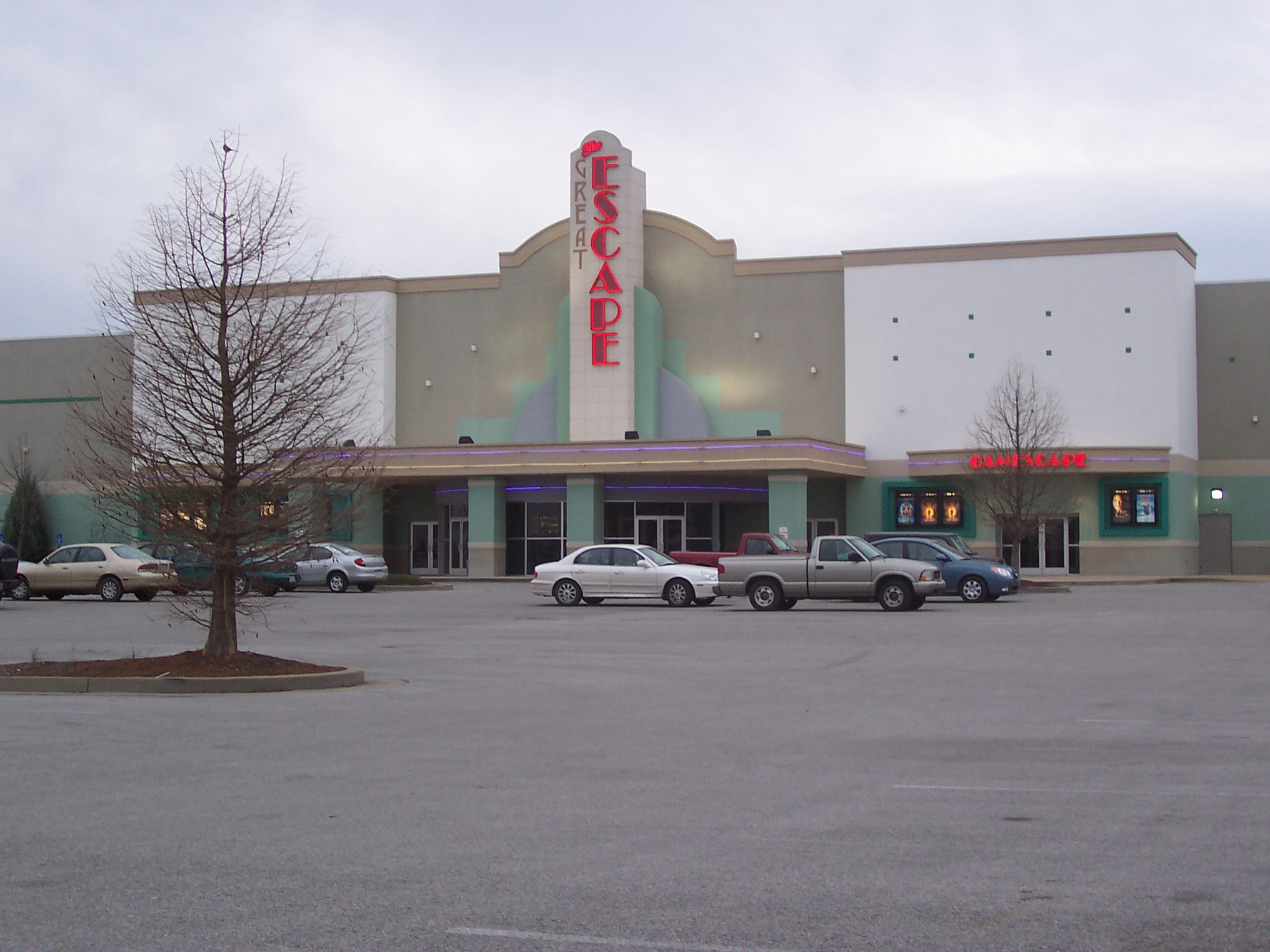
The Bowling Green 12 Theatre, Bowling Green, KY.

The company operated 305 screens at 26 locations. According to a statement on the company's former website, Great Escape Theatre locations were chosen based on population size, with preferred locations being identified as "mid-size" market areas consisting of populations between 100,000 and 400,000 people.

Great Escape Theatres was sold to Regal Cinemas for approximately $91m in December 2012.

== Theatre locations ==
Great Escape Theatre Locations
Theatre	Location	Date Opened or Acquired
Bedford 7	Bedford, Indiana	May 1997
Seymour 8	Seymour, Indiana	May 1999
Oldham 8	La Grange, Kentucky	Sept.1998 (closed May 7, 2013)
Madison 6	Madison, Indiana	Sept. 1998
Weston 4	Weston, West Virginia	Sept. 1998 (closed)
Princess 4	Oxford, Ohio	May 2000 (closed Nov 2012)
Wilder 14	Wilder, Kentucky	Jan. 2001
Bowling Green 12	Bowling Green, Kentucky	May 2002
New Albany 16	New Albany, Indiana	June 2003
Clarksville 16	Clarksville, Tennessee	Oct. 2003
Shelbyville 8	Shelbyville, Kentucky	Nov. 2003
Williamsport 12	Muncy, Pennsylvania	April 2004
Noblesville 10	Noblesville, Indiana	Oct. 2004
Greenwood 10	Bowling Green, Kentucky	Nov. 2004
Wilkes-Barre 4	Wilkes-Barre, PA	Nov. 2004 (closed 2008)
Massilon 12	Massillon, Ohio	May 2005
Moline 14	Moline, Illinois	May 2005
Nitro 12	Nitro, West Virginia	June 2005
O'Fallon 14	O'Fallon, Missouri	Sept. 2005
McDonough 16	McDonough, Georgia	Nov. 2005
Lebanon Valley 10	Lebanon, PA	July 2006
Omaha 16	Omaha, Nebraska	Oct. 2006
River Falls 12	Clarksville, Indiana	Nov. 2006
Harrisburg 14	Harrisburg, PA	Nov. 2007
Hamilton Mill 14	Dacula, GA	July 11, 2008
Gravois Bluffs 12	Fenton, MO	Dec. 19, 2008
Simpsonville 14 IMAX	Simpsonville, SC	April 26, 2010
Dickson City 14 IMAX	Dickson City, PA	November 4, 2010
