= Mount Joy station =

Mount Joy station may refer to:

- Mount Joy GO Station in Markham, Ontario, Canada
- Mount Joy station (Pennsylvania) in Mount Joy, Pennsylvania, US
