= Lancaster City Historic District =

Historic district in Pennsylvania, United States

- U.S. National Register of Historic Places
- U.S. Historic district
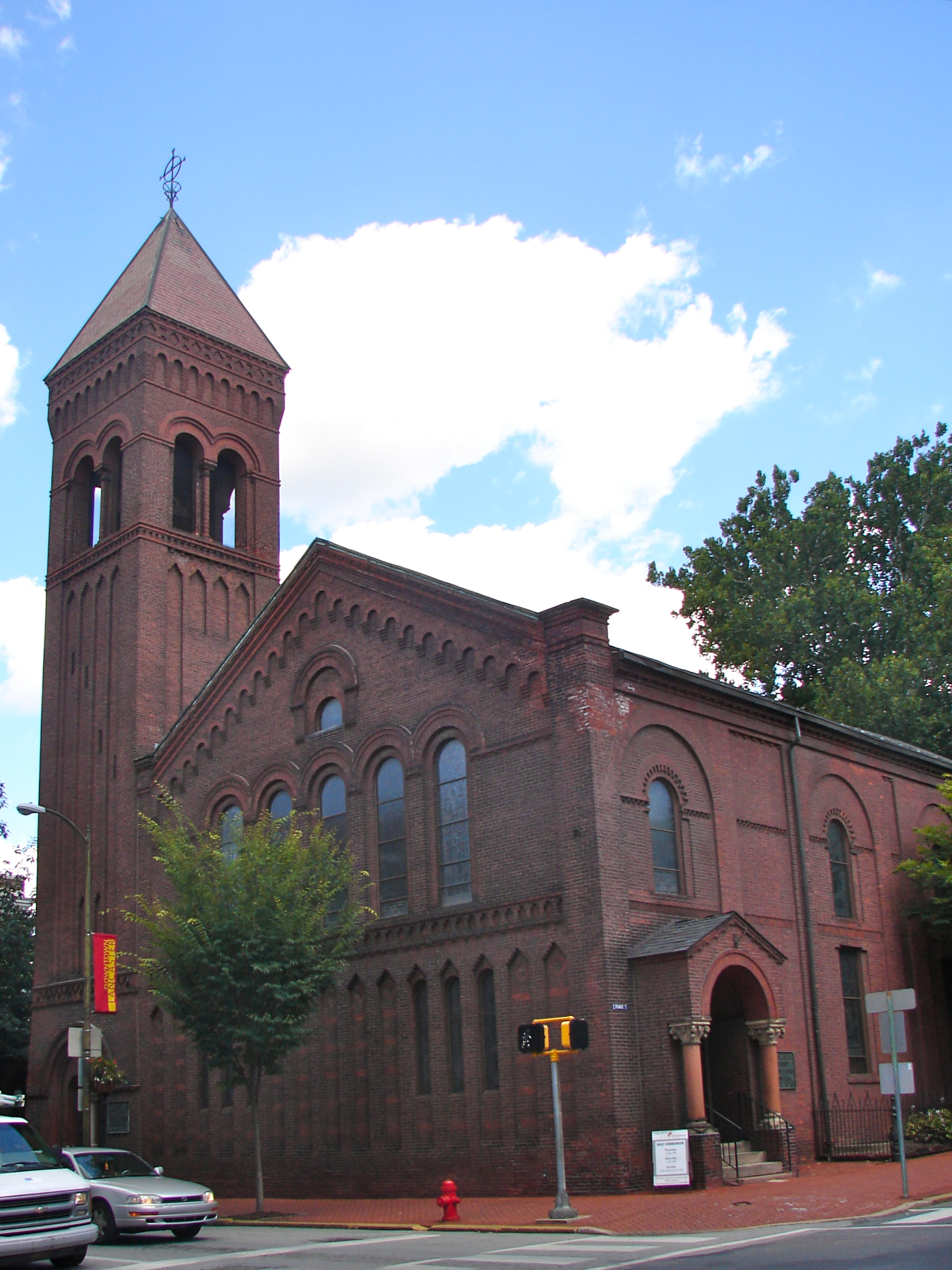
- St James Episcopal Church, August 2011

- Location within Pennsylvania Location within the United States
- Location: Roughly bounded by Liberty St., Broad St., Greenwood Ave., Race Ave.,, Lancaster and Manheim Township, Pennsylvania
- Coordinates: 40°02′29″N 76°18′25″W
- Area: 1,906 acres (771 ha)
- Built: 1760
- Architect: Urban, C. Emlen; et al.
- Architectural style: Queen Anne, Italianate, et al.
- NRHP reference No.: 01000956
- Added to NRHP: September 7, 2001

The Lancaster City Historic District is a national historic district that is located in Lancaster and Manheim Township, Lancaster County, Pennsylvania.

It was listed on the National Register of Historic Places in 2001.

== History and architectural features ==
This historic district measures three square miles and includes 13,459 contributing buildings, nine contributing sites, six contributing structures, and nineteen contributing objects that are located in the city of Lancaster. The buildings date from 1760 to 1950, with the majority dating from 1860 to 1930. A number of the buildings were designed by Lancaster architect C. Emlen Urban. All of the previously listed individual buildings and structures and historic districts are included in this district.

Other notable buildings and sites include the City Hall (1891-1892), Lancaster County Prison (1851), Miller and Hartman Building, Shaub Shoe Store, Watt & Shand, Conestoga Steam Cotton Works (1845-1910), Posey Iron Works, St. Mary's Catholic Church (1852 / 1867), Temple Shaarai Shamoyim (1895-1896), Bethel A.M.E. Church (c. 1880), the Unitarian Universalist Church of Lancaster, Pennsylvania Railroad Station (1929), Lancaster Cemetery, Woodward Hill Cemetery, and Zion Lutheran Cemetery.
