= Elizabethtown station =

Amtrak station in Pennsylvania

Elizabethtown, PA
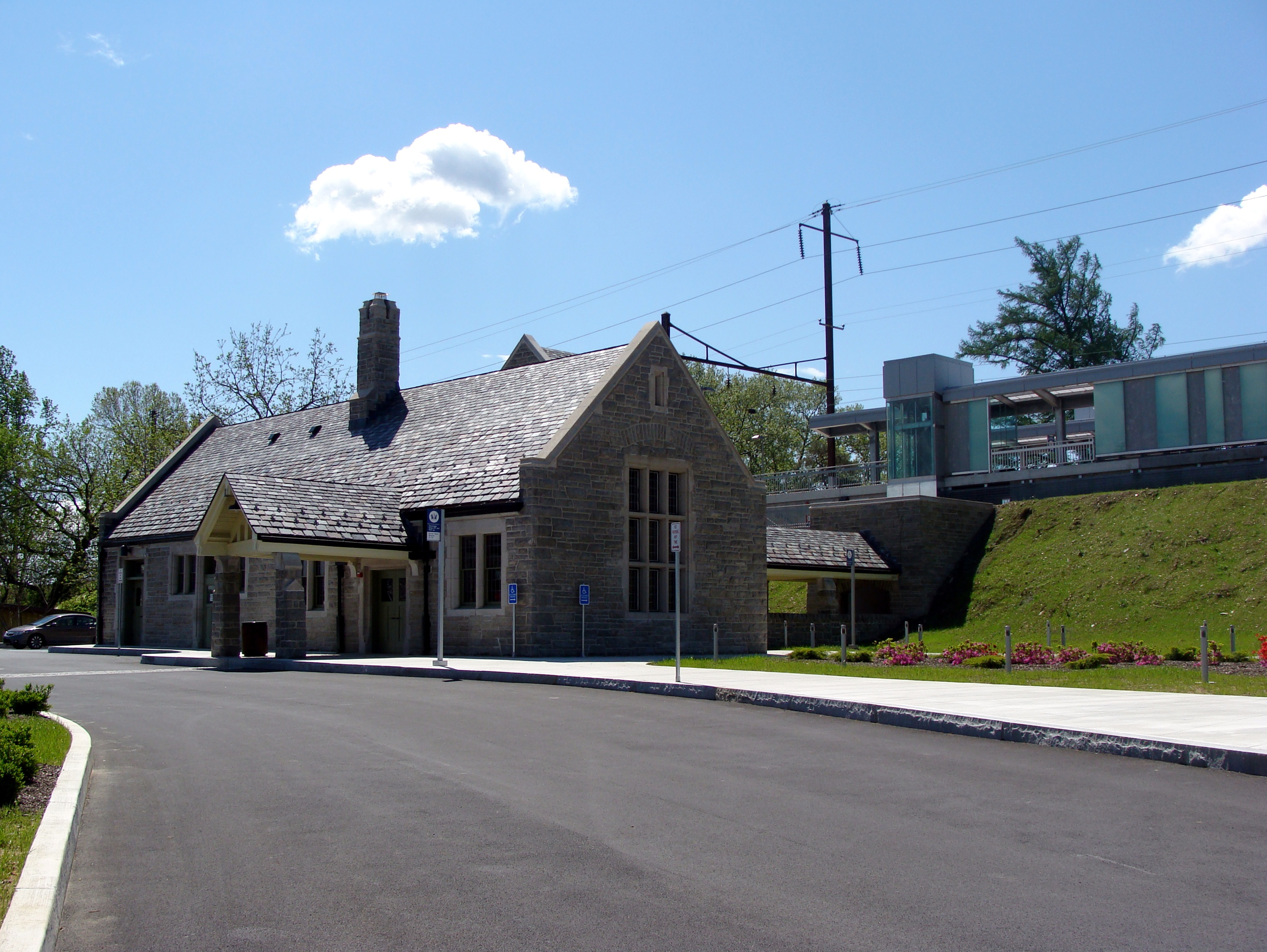
- Elizabethtown station

General information
- Location: 50 South Wilson Avenue; Elizabethtown, Pennsylvania; United States
- Coordinates: 40°8′48.8″N 76°36′44″W
- Owner: Amtrak
- Line: Amtrak Philadelphia to Harrisburg Main Line (Keystone Corridor)
- Platforms: 2 side platforms
- Tracks: 2
- Connections: Red Rose Transit Authority: 18

Construction
- Parking: 49 short-term, 90 long-term
- Cycle facilities: Racks
- Accessible: Yes

Other information
- Station code: Amtrak: ELT

History
- Opened: 1915
- Rebuilt: August 2009–May 2011
- Electrified: January 15, 1938

Passengers
- FY 2025: 58,311 (Amtrak)

Services
Preceding station	Amtrak	Following station
Middletown toward Harrisburg	Keystone Service	Mount Joy toward New York
Harrisburg toward Pittsburgh	Pennsylvanian	Lancaster toward New York
Former services
Preceding station	Pennsylvania Railroad	Following station
Conewago toward Chicago	Main Line	Rheems toward New York or Exchange Place
Location

Elizabethtown station is an Amtrak railroad station on the Keystone Corridor in Elizabethtown, Lancaster County in the U.S. state of Pennsylvania. The station is served by Amtrak's Keystone Service between New York City and Harrisburg, and by the Pennsylvanian between New York and Pittsburgh. The station was built in 1915 by the Pennsylvania Railroad to replace another that had been built in 1900. The station building was closed in 1977 by Amtrak. The title to the building was transferred to the borough of Elizabethtown in 1998, and it was leased back to Amtrak. From 2009 to 2011, the station underwent a 21-month renovation to make it handicapped-accessible.

== Services and facilities ==
The Elizabethtown station is located on South Wilson Avenue, off of Pennsylvania Route 241 (West High Street). In addition to being used by passengers originating from Elizabethtown and surrounding Lancaster County, residents of nearby Dauphin and Lebanon counties utilize the Elizabethtown station as well. It sees twenty-six arrivals by the Keystone Service on weekdays, thirteen from both Harrisburg and New York Penn Station, and seven from each on weekends. The Pennsylvanian arrives twice daily from both New York and Pittsburgh Union Station. The station is 18 miles (29 km) east of Harrisburg, 86 miles (138 km) west of 30th Street Station in Philadelphia, and 179 miles (288 km) from New York. The station was the 7th busiest in Pennsylvania with an annual ridership of 22,232 passengers in fiscal year 2021, a decrease of 52.2 percent from the previous year.

The station is equipped with Amtrak's Quik-Trak ticket machines, public restrooms, information kiosks, and wireless internet. As the Elizabethtown station is unstaffed, all tickets from the station need to be pre-paid, purchased from Quik-Trak, or from a conductor on board the train. Parking is in a 45-vehicle lot located in front of the station and a 100-vehicle "overflow lot [located] down the street." The Red Rose Transit Authority's Route 18 transit bus provides service between the station, Elizabethtown, Mount Joy, and Lancaster.

Elizabethtown College's campus security drives students to the train station.

== History ==
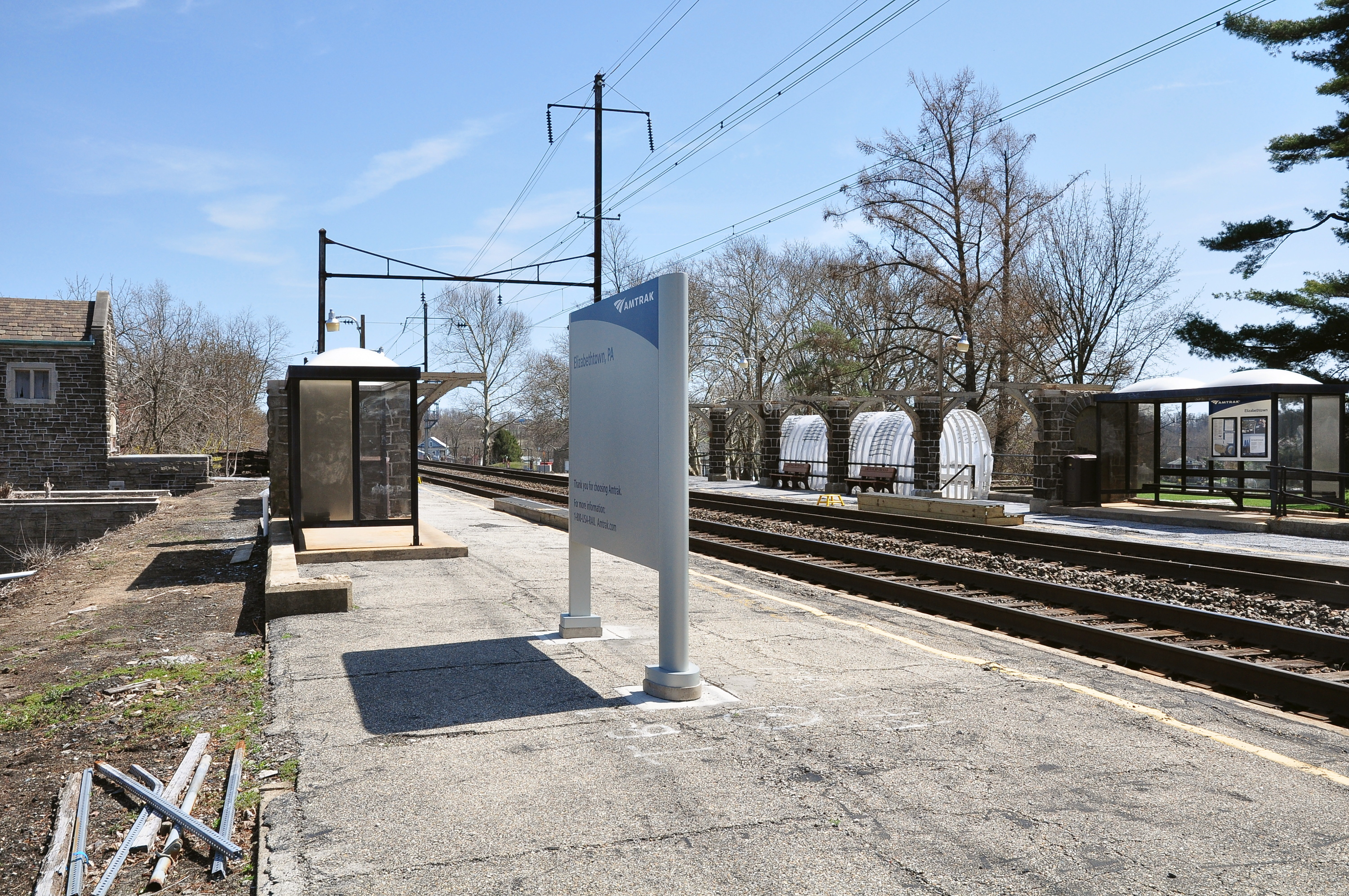
Platforms in April 2009

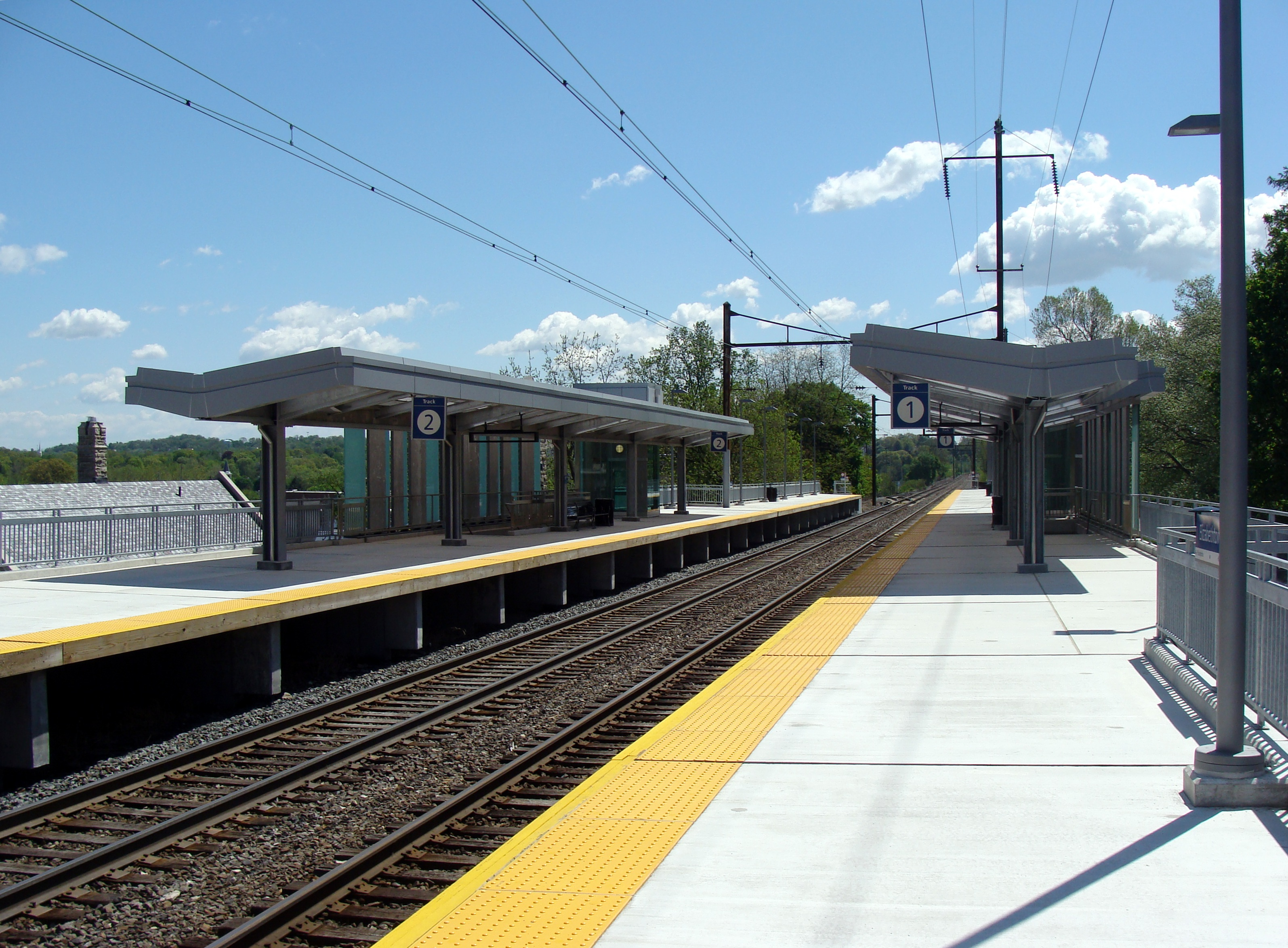
Platforms in May 2011

Because of the construction of an embankment at nearby Bainbridge Street, the Pennsylvania Railroad was forced to build a new station at West High Street in 1900. After 15 years, the Pennsylvania replaced the station. The new station was constructed out of Indiana Limestone in a similar style to the nearby Masonic Homes built by the Grand Lodge of Pennsylvania. On July 4, 1915, the Liberty Bell made a stop at the station while being transported to the Panama–Pacific International Exposition in San Francisco, California. The Pennsylvania began electrifying its line between Philadelphia and Harrisburg in 1937, a task which was completed on January 15, 1938. In 1977, the deteriorating station building was closed. Prior to the introduction of the Keystone Service in 1981, the Elizabethtown station was served by the Big Apple, the Silverliner Service, and the Keystone. From 1991 to 1995, the Atlantic City Express served the station on weekends. The Three Rivers made stops in Elizabethtown in 1995 and 1996.

=== Renovations ===
In August 1998, the station building was leased to Amtrak for 99 years by the borough of Elizabethtown for $1 per year after ownership was transferred to the borough; ownership of the platforms and right-of-way was retained by Amtrak. Renovations began in August 2009 and were funded by $9.3 million from the American Recovery and Reinvestment Act of 2009. The station was cited by U.S. Senator Tom Coburn as an example of pork barrel spending in the stimulus bill. Elevators were built and the station's two platforms were raised, per the requirements of Americans with Disabilities Act of 1990. The platforms were also lengthened to accommodate longer trains. Canopies were erected over the platforms to provide protection from the elements for waiting passengers. The station building was completely remodeled, including restoration of the original wood furnishings, replacement of broken slate roof tiles, and masonry repointing. The completed station was unveiled in a ribbon-cutting ceremony on May 4, 2011.

== See also ==
- List of Amtrak stations
- Transportation in Lancaster County, Pennsylvania

== Sources ==
- Bezilla, Michael (1980). Electric Traction on the Pennsylvania Railroad, 1895–1968. University Park: Penn State University Press. ISBN 978-0271002415. OCLC 5336721.
- MacMaster, Richard K (1999). Elizabethtown: the first three centuries. Morgantown, Pennsylvania: Mastof Press. ISBN 1-883294-91-6.
