= Unitarian Universalist Church of Lancaster =

Coordinates: 40.039953°N 76.316560°W

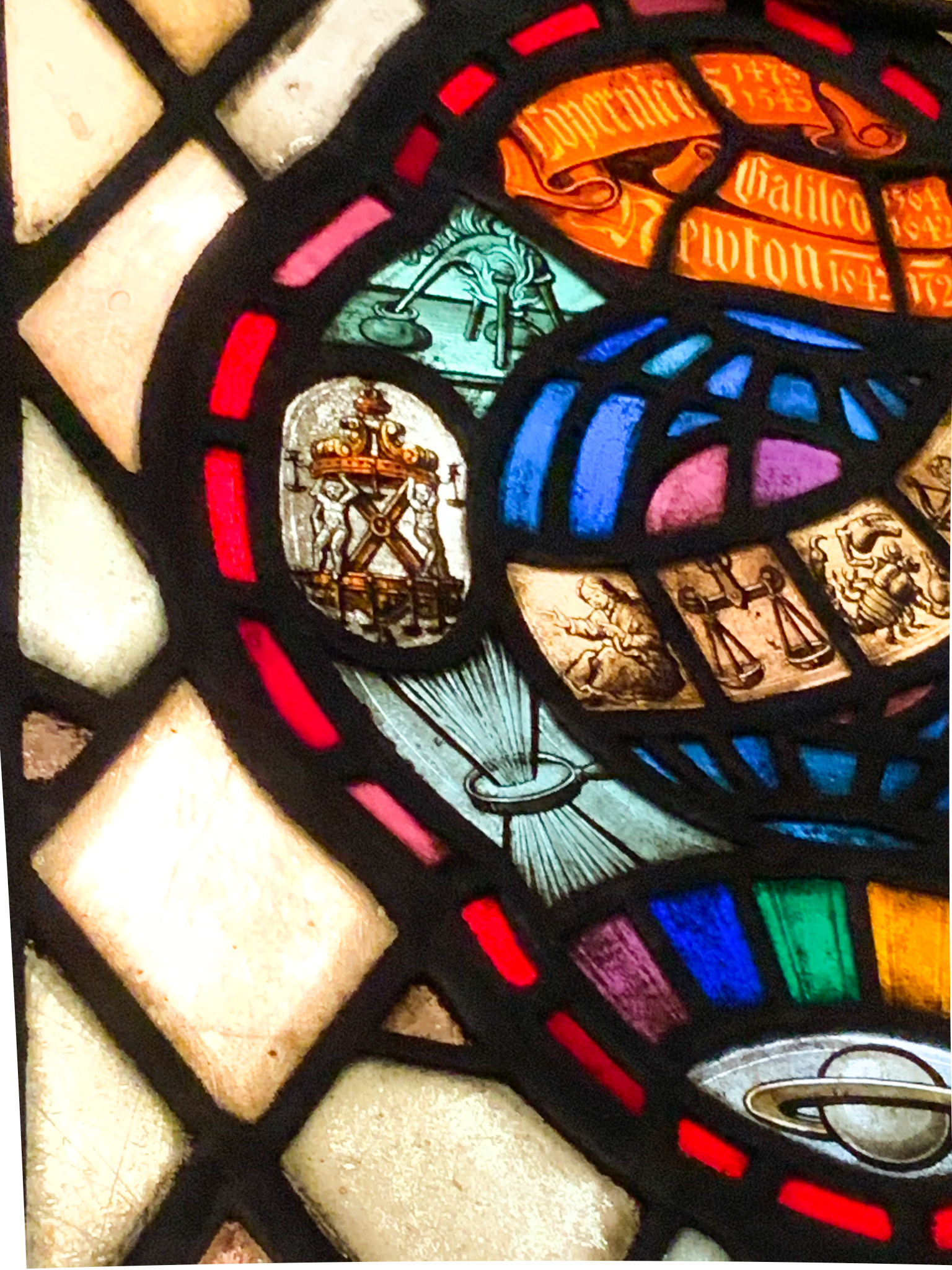
- Unitarian Universalist Church of Lancaster
- Location: 538 West Chestnut Street, Lancaster, Pennsylvania
- Country: United States
- Denomination: Unitarian Universalist
- Website: uuclonline.org

History
- Founded: 1902

The Unitarian Universalist Church of Lancaster is a Unitarian Universalist church located at 538 West Chestnut Street, Lancaster, Pennsylvania. The church building is part of the Historic District of the City of Lancaster. The congregation is a member of the Unitarian Universalist Association, in the Association's Central East Region (Joseph Priestley District). Like all Unitarian Universalist churches, it is noncreedal, covenantal and religiously liberal. According to the UUA, the Lancaster church currently has 275 members and is an LGBTQIA+ Welcoming Congregation.

== Early history ==
The church was established as a Unitarian congregation in 1902, in outreach between the expanding American Unitarian Association, then promoting a "new Unitarianism", and local businessmen and women who wanted a religiously liberal church in their community. The original congregation consisted of 13 men and 10 women; it met in temporary quarters until a new building could be erected for it (1908–1909). Originally called "The Church of Our Father, Unitarian", the congregation took its present name after the consolidation of the Unitarian and Universalist denominations in 1961.

== Architecture and interior design ==
The church has ties to several historic religious communities in Lancaster, notably St. James Episcopal Church (also in the Historic District) and the Lancaster Theological Seminary, but the Unitarian Universalist building is newer and represents the last era of generally acknowledged architectural distinction in the city. Except for an addition built next door in 1972, the exterior of the church is largely unchanged from its appearance in 1909, when it was dedicated. It was designed by Lancaster's leading architect, Cassius Emlen Urban, but is an unusual example of his work. Smaller than his other Lancaster churches, it follows the transitional Gothic style with Norman elements advocated for such churches by Ralph Adams Cram and Alexander Bourne.

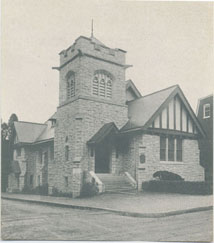
Early picture of the Church of Our Father, Unitarian, in Lancaster, Pennsylvania

The interior underwent extensive renovation in the 1920s, including installation of stained-glass windows by the firms of Franz Xaver Zettler (sanctuary and vestibule) and Charles Connick (women's parlor). The interior has stayed essentially unchanged since those renovations, and, like the exterior, the interior work is atypical of the firms that produced it. Subjects memorialized in the windows include colonizer Christopher Columbus and enslaver Thomas Jefferson. The choices were influenced by the views of a founding member of the church, Milton T. Garvin (1860–1936), a prominent local merchant and philanthropist who personally funded the construction and decoration of the building and worked closely with the architects and ministers involved. Garvin's family were Hicksite Quakers from the Nottingham Lots community of southern Pennsylvania and Maryland, and he joined the "new Unitarian movement", as he referred to it, in the absence of a recognized Quaker meeting in Lancaster. Garvin became a Unitarian activist and initiated the Association's Religious Arts Society (1923), but was a life-long "advocate for universal peace", which complicated his attitude toward the controversial pro-war stance of the Association during World War One. After the war Garvin commissioned sanctuary windows which, while taking World War One and the American Civil War as subject matter, advocate for peace and reconciliation as core values in American history and civic life. The sanctuary windows and other sanctuary decoration were designed by the Swiss-American architect and artist Woldemar H. Ritter (1880 – c. 1935), whose modernist artistic approach was approved by Garvin and distinguishes the Lancaster windows from other work by Zettler. The sanctuary windows were installed in 1926. The windows by Charles Connick were commissioned for the women's parlor and were designed by Connick; they were installed in 1929 and dedicated in 1930.

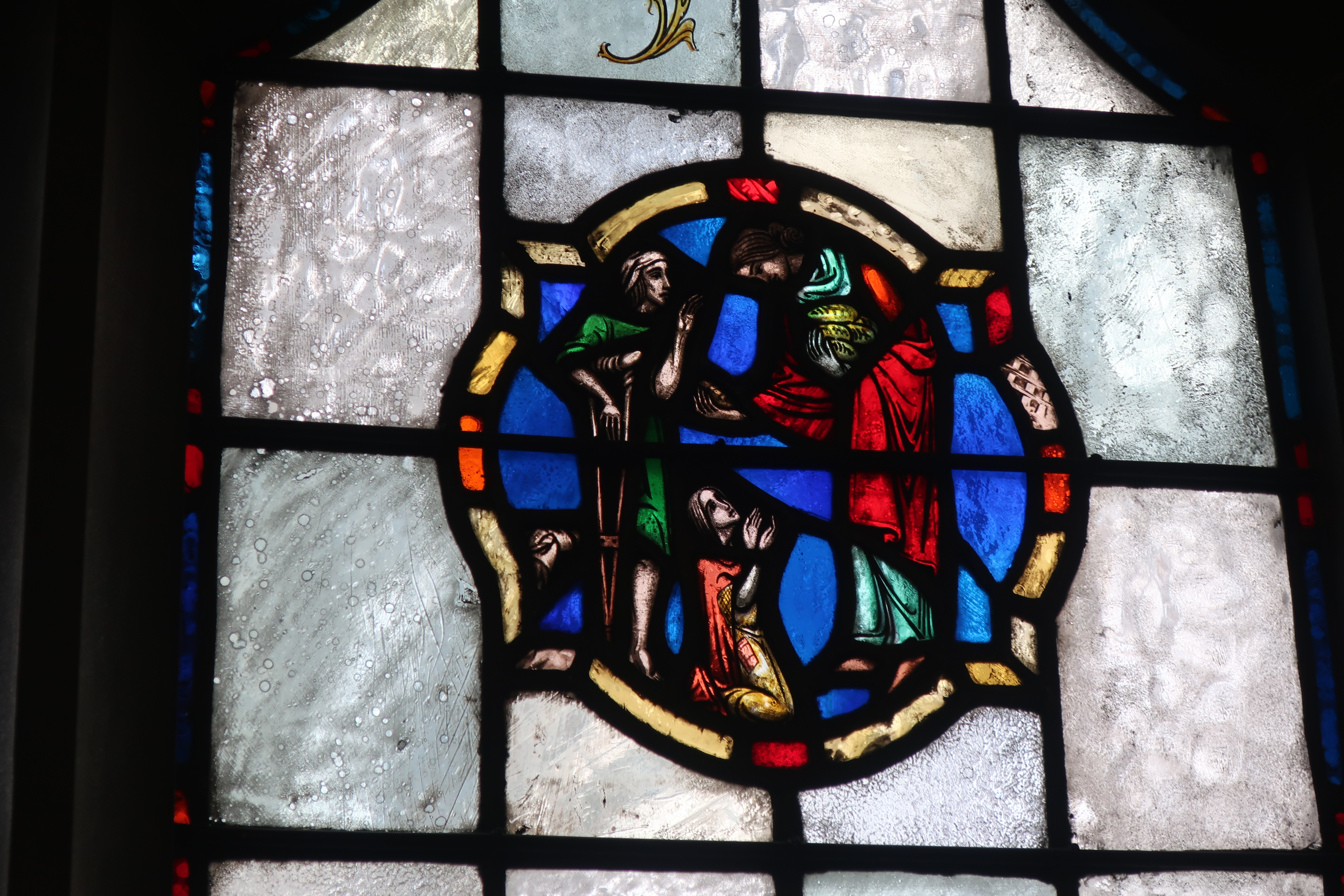
Connick window (detail)

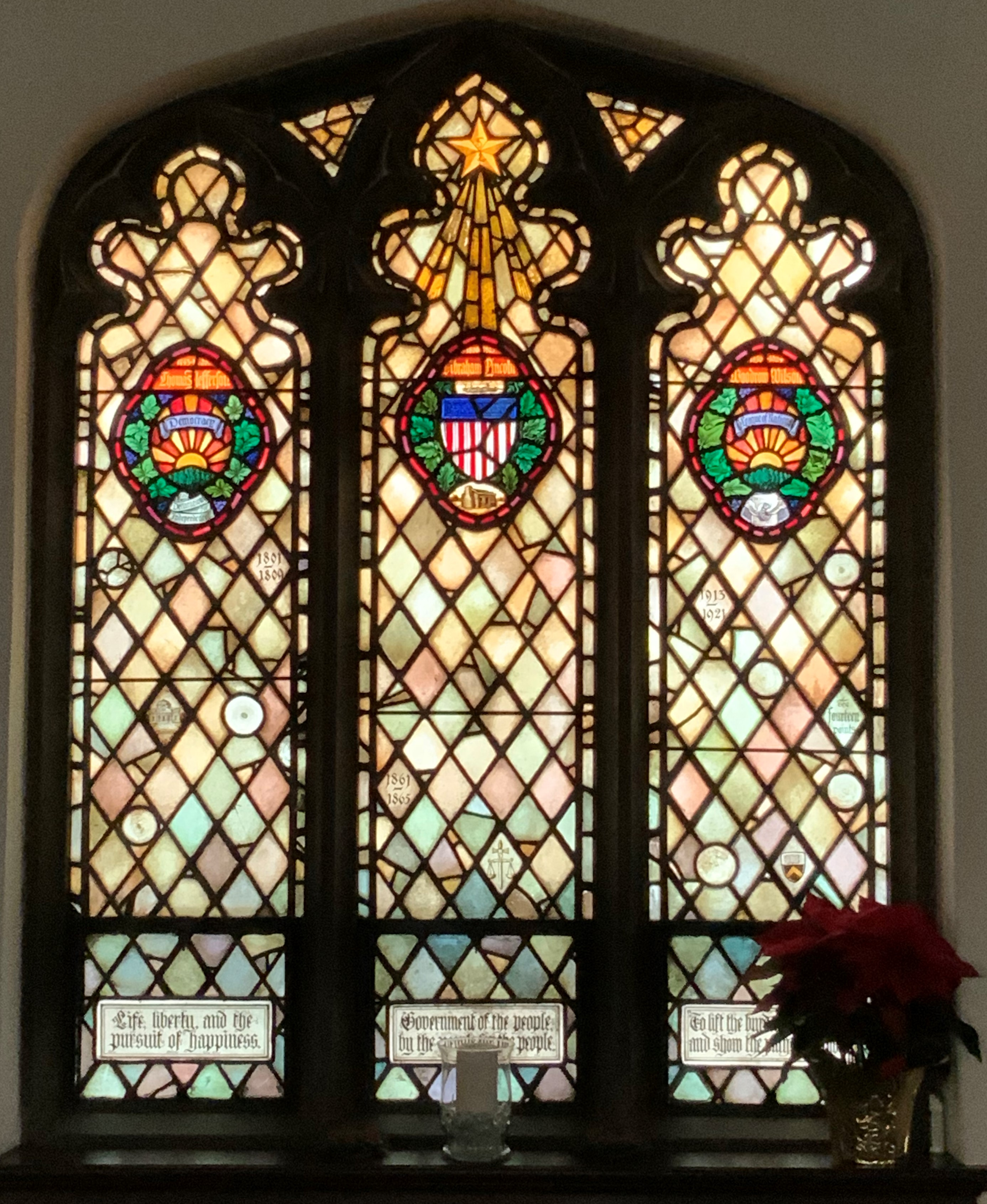
Zettler window, W.H. Ritter design UU Church of Lancaster sanctuary

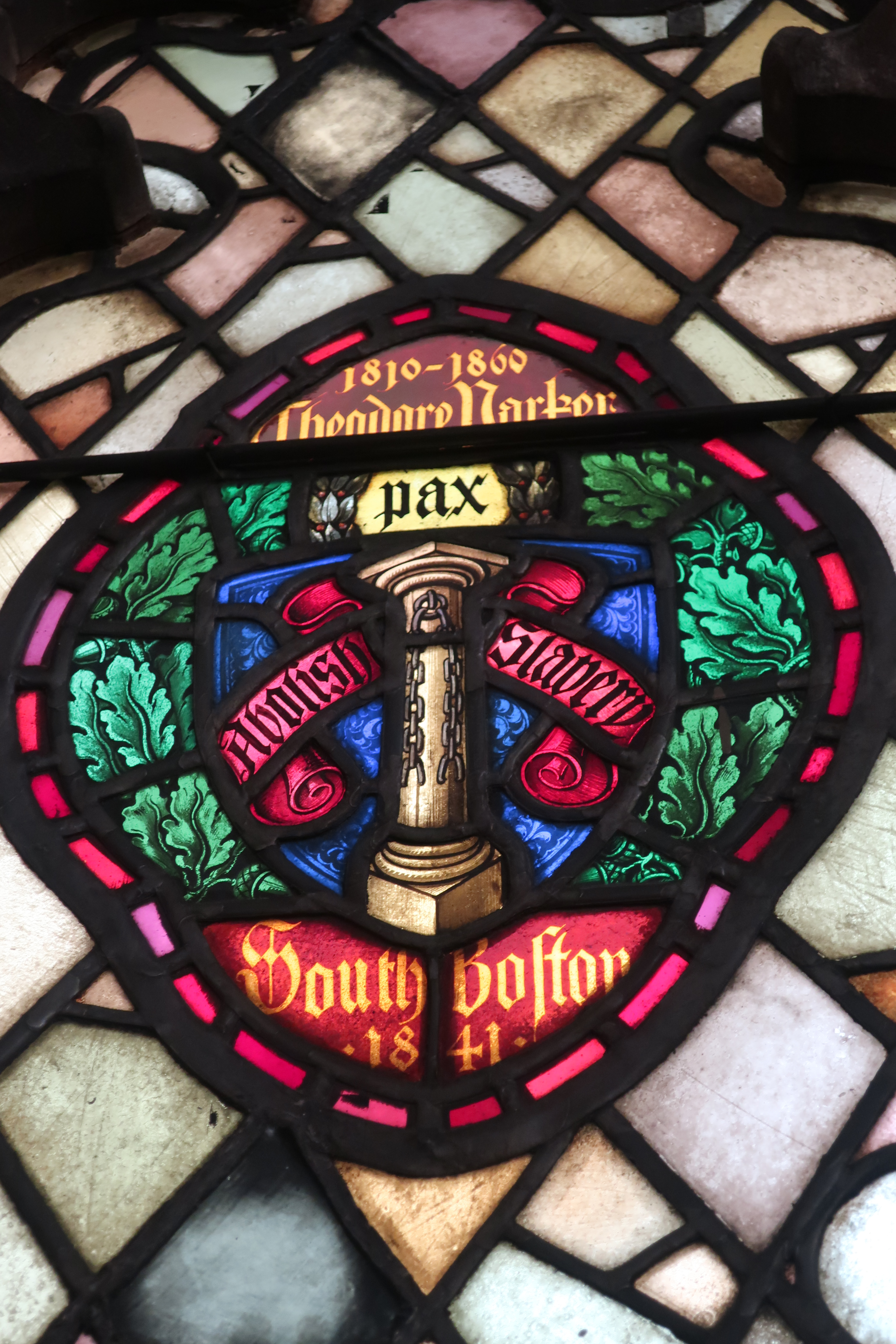
Zettler window designed by W.H. Ritter, honoring abolitionist Theodore Parker (detail)

== List of ministers ==
- William A. Lawton (1902)
- Charles Phelps Wellman (1903)
- Melvin Brandow (1904–1908)
- Eugene Rodman Shippen (1908–1909)
- John Wallace Cooper (1910–1912)
- Edmund Henry Reeman (1913–1916)
- Charles Reidel (1916–1918)
- Earl Clement Davis (1919–1923)
- John Boynton Wilson Day (1924–1929)
- Robert Sheridan Miller (1930–1937)
- Harvey V. Swanson (1937–1956)
- Nathaniel Page Lauriat (1957–1963)
- Anthony R. Perrino (1964–1967)
- Robert Payson (1967–1987)
- Webster 'Kit' Kitchell Howell (1990–1996)
- Susan Milnor (1997–2002)
- Valerie Mapstone Ackerman (2003–2004)
- Patricia Hart and Peter Newport (2007–2013)
- Anne Mason (2013–2016)
- Barbara Coeyman (2016–2020)
- Israel Buffardi (2020–2022)
- Patricia Guthmann Haresch (2022–2024)
- Howard N. Dana (2024–present)
