= Lancaster station (Pennsylvania) =

Train station in Lancaster, Pennsylvania, US

Lancaster, PA
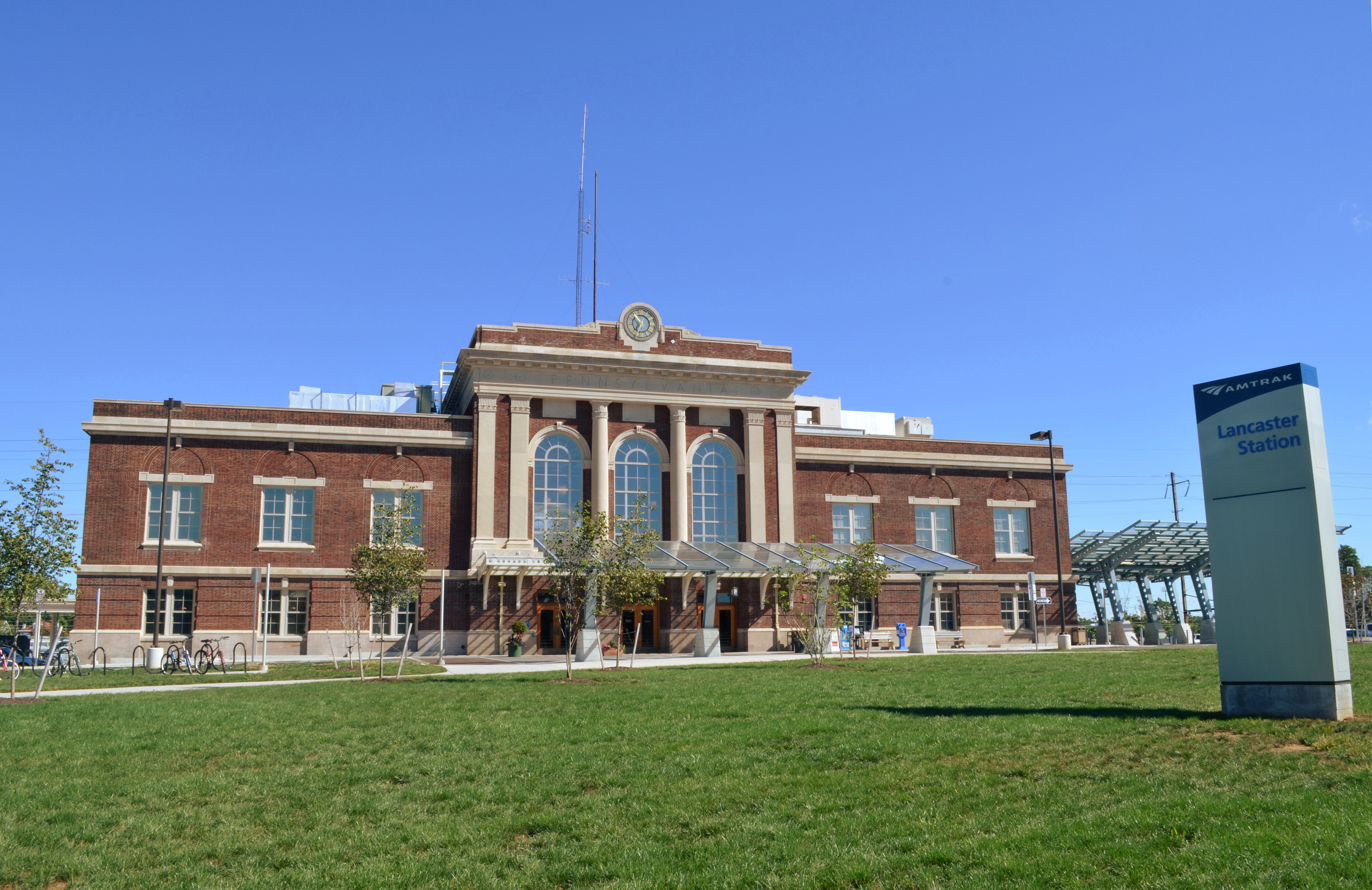
- Lancaster station in September 2012

General information
- Location: 53 East McGovern Avenue; Lancaster, Pennsylvania; United States
- Coordinates: 40°3′15.71″N 76°18′27.80″W
- Owner: Amtrak
- Line: Amtrak Philadelphia to Harrisburg Main Line (Keystone Corridor)
- Platforms: 2 island platforms
- Tracks: 4
- Connections: Red Rose Transit Authority: 1, 6, 10, 11, 19

Construction
- Parking: 30 short-term, 50 long-term
- Accessible: yes
- Architectural style: Neoclassical

Other information
- Station code: Amtrak: LNC
- IATA code: ZRL

History
- Opened: April 28, 1929
- Electrified: January 15, 1938

Passengers
- FY 2025: 458,299 (Amtrak)

Services
Preceding station	Amtrak	Following station
Mount Joy toward Harrisburg	Keystone Service	Parkesburg toward New York
Elizabethtown toward Pittsburgh	Pennsylvanian	Paoli toward New York
Former services
Preceding station	Amtrak	Following station
Harrisburg toward Chicago	Three Rivers 1995–2005	Paoli toward New York
Harrisburg toward Chicago	Broadway Limited Until 1995	Paoli toward New York
Harrisburg toward Kansas City	National Limited	Paoli toward New York
Preceding station	Pennsylvania Railroad	Following station
Landisville toward Chicago	Main Line	Witmer toward New York or Exchange Place
Mountville toward Frederick	Frederick – Lancaster	Terminus

U.S. Historic district – Contributing property
- Official name: Pennsylvania Railroad Station
- Designated: September 7, 2001
- Part of: Lancaster City Historic District
- Reference no.: 01000956
Location

Lancaster station is an Amtrak railroad station and a former Pennsylvania Railroad station in Lancaster, Lancaster County in the U.S. state of Pennsylvania. Located on the Keystone Corridor, the station is served by the Keystone Service between New York City and Harrisburg, and by the Pennsylvanian between New York and Pittsburgh. Lancaster is the second busiest Amtrak station in Pennsylvania, and the twenty-first busiest in the United States. It is one of the busiest Amtrak stations serving a metropolitan area smaller than two million people, primarily because of the large number of passengers traveling to and from Philadelphia and points east.

The first railroad station to be established in Lancaster was on the Philadelphia and Columbia Railroad in 1834. The station was acquired by the Pennsylvania Railroad in 1857 who replaced it with a new building. The current station building was constructed in 1929 north of the city by the Pennsylvania after a rail line bypassing the city was opened. Currently owned by Amtrak, the station is listed on the National Register of Historic Places as part of the Lancaster City Historic District.

== Services and facilities ==
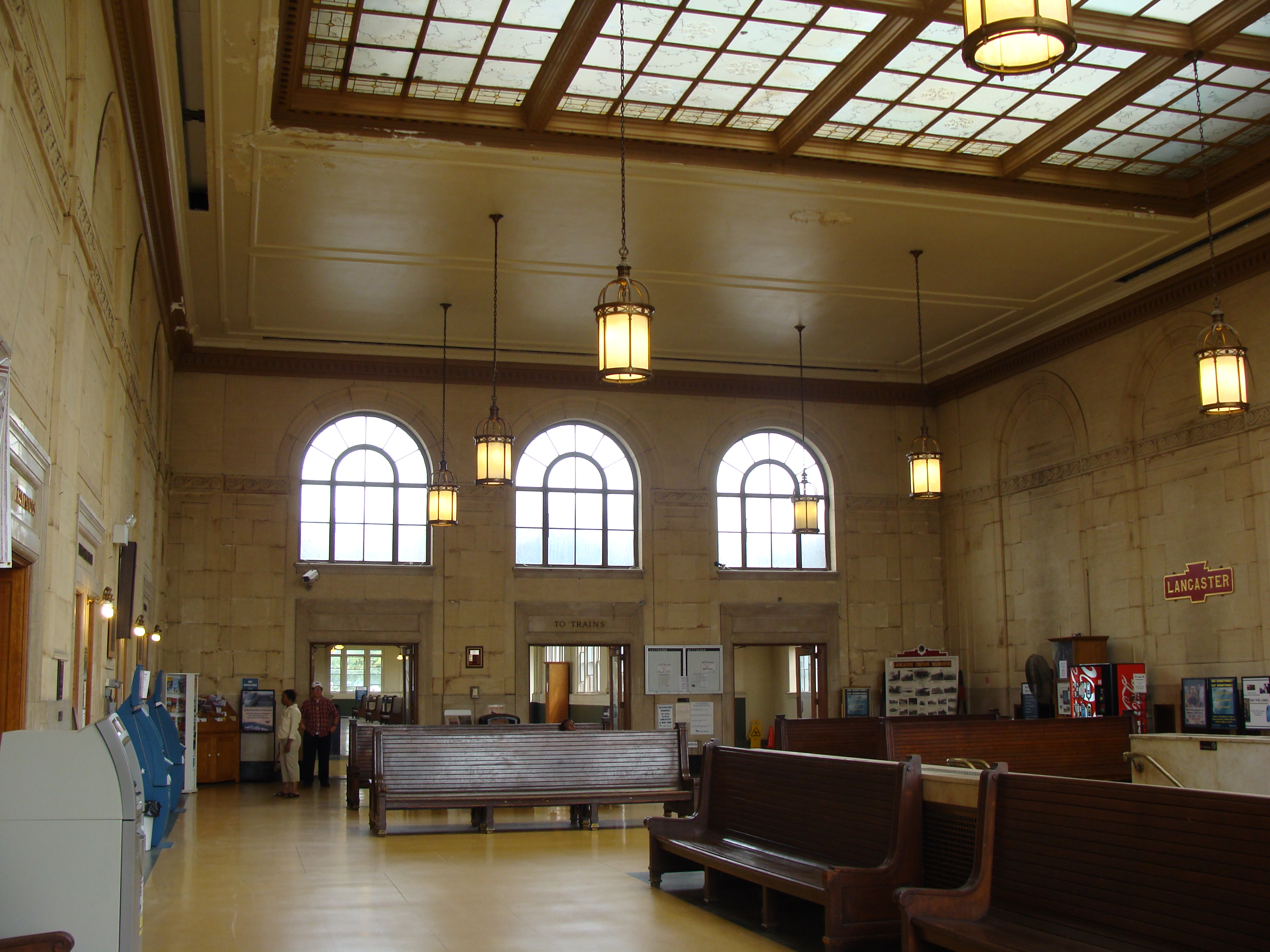
Station interior in 2010

The Lancaster station is located on East McGovern Avenue, westbound Pennsylvania Route 272 and U.S. Route 222, between the northern ends of Queen and Duke Streets. It sees twenty-six arrivals by the Keystone Service on weekdays, thirteen from both Harrisburg and New York Penn Station, and seven from each on weekends. The Pennsylvanian arrives twice daily from both New York City and Pittsburgh Union Station. The station is 49 miles (79 km) east of Harrisburg, 55 miles (89 km) west of 30th Street Station in Philadelphia, and 146 miles (235 km) from New York City. The station was second busiest in the state—behind only Philadelphia 30th Street—during fiscal year 2019 with a ridership of 577,305 passengers, an increase of 1.7 percent from the previous year. It is also the 21st busiest Amtrak station nationally.

The Lancaster station is equipped with a ticket office, Amtrak's Quik-Trak ticket machines, vending, and public restrooms. The Red Rose Transit Authority provides local bus service to the station. Route 6 stops in front of the station and provides service to and from downtown Lancaster and to nearby shopping centers. Route 1 serving Northeast Lancaster and Southeast Lancaster and Route 19 to Manheim stop along McGovern Avenue adjacent to the station; the closest stop for Route 19 heading toward downtown Lancaster is located at Prince Street and Liberty Street. Route 10 to Lititz and Route 11 to Ephrata stop along McGovern Avenue across the street from the station; the closest stop for Route 10 and Route 11 heading toward downtown Lancaster is located at Duke Street and Liberty Street.

== History ==
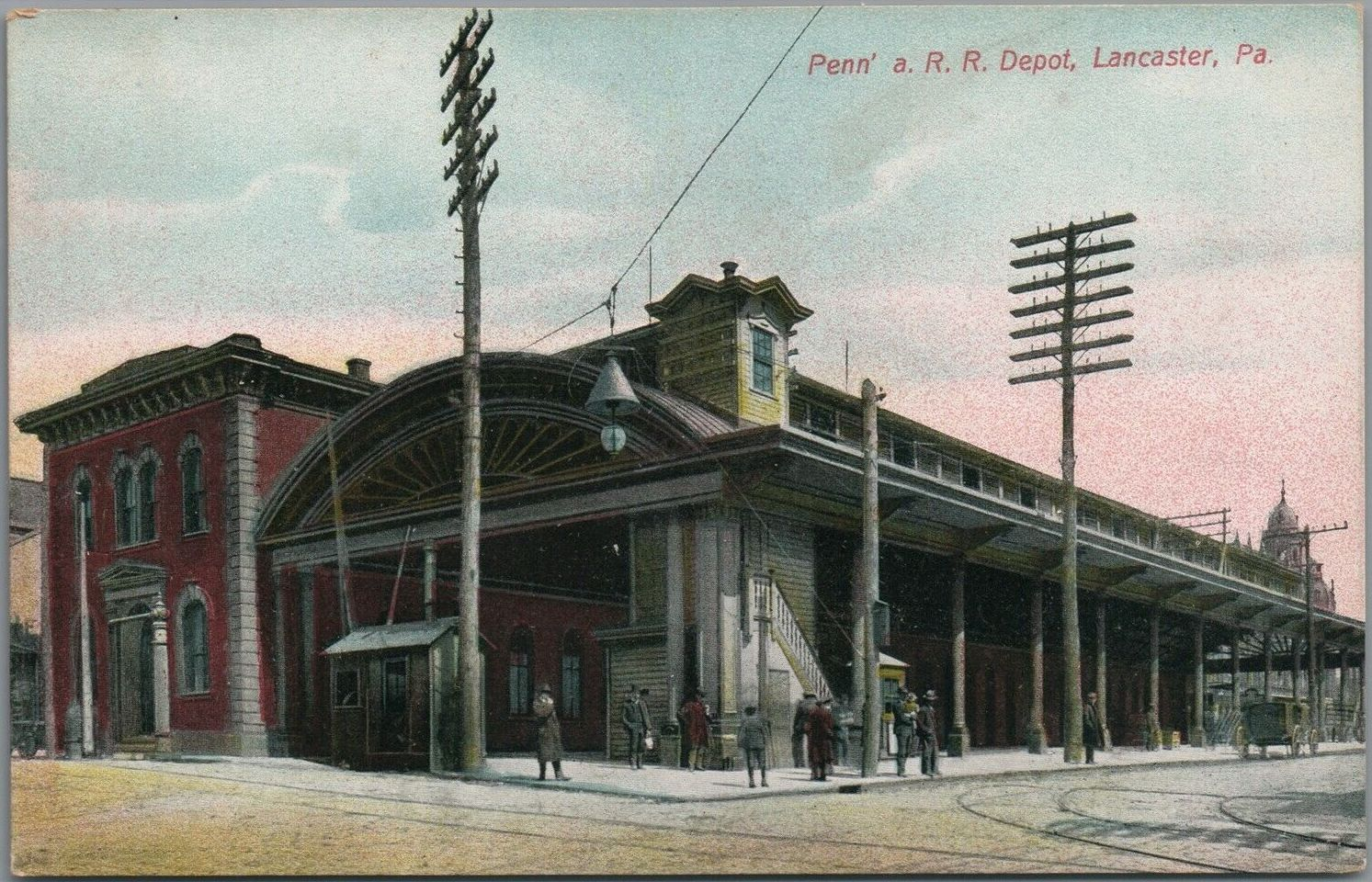
Postcard of the 1859-built station

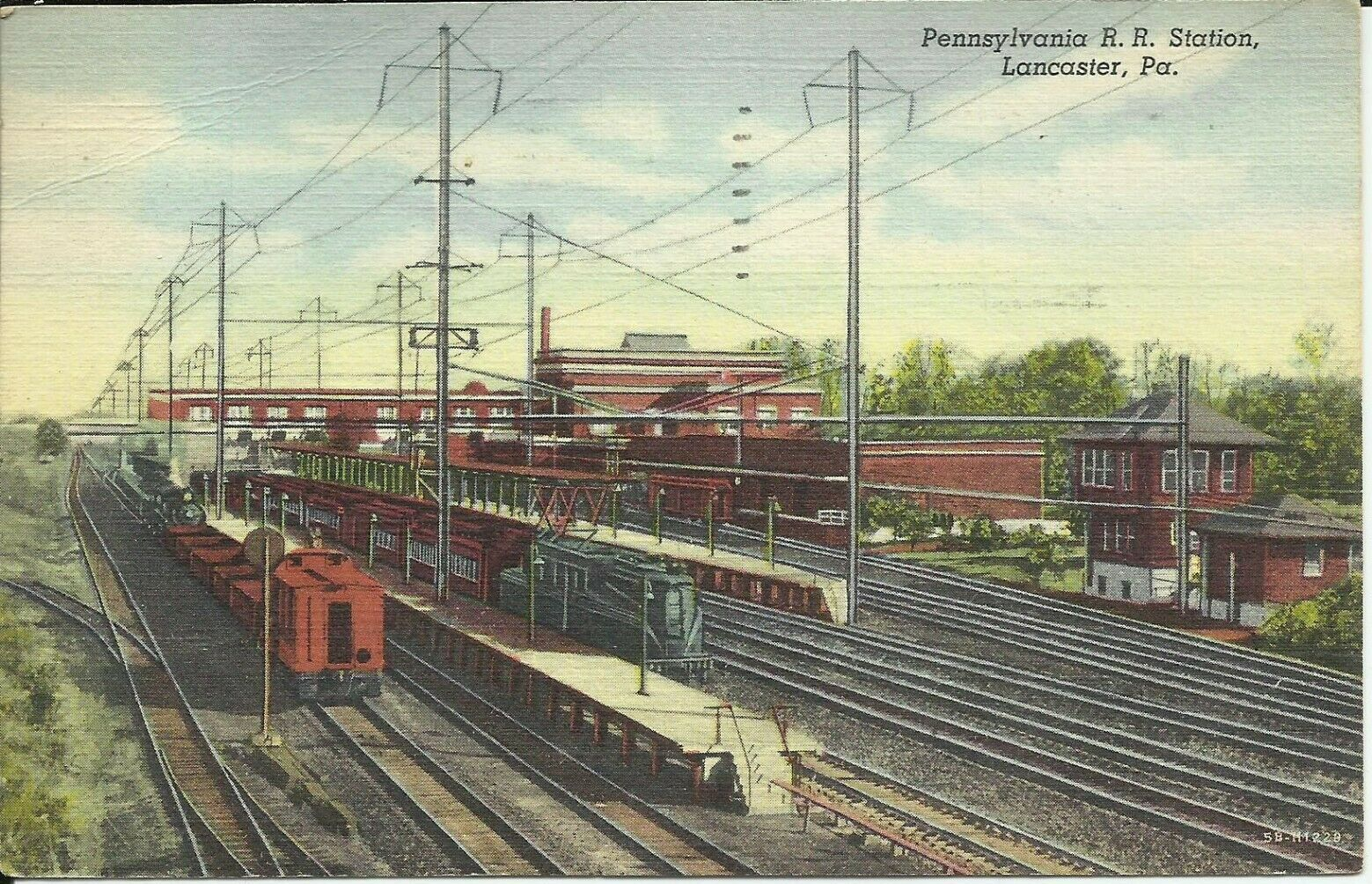
A 1949 postcard of the station

=== Philadelphia and Columbia Railroad ===
One of the methods of long-distance transportation of bulk goods in the early-1800s were canals, while goods imported from Europe or manufactured on the East Coast were shipped overland by roads. With construction of the Erie Canal and the National Road, the citizens of Philadelphia became worried of the loss of trade to New York City and Baltimore, Maryland, and persuaded the state government to invest in a transportation network to travel west over the Allegheny Mountains. The Pennsylvania General Assembly authorized the construction of the Main Line of Public Works across the state in 1826. An unsuccessful attempt was made in 1828 by a private company to divert downriver trade to Baltimore from the Susquehanna River to Philadelphia via the Columbia, Lancaster and Philadelphia Railroad.

The legislature revised its plan to include the failed attempt with a connection from the canal terminus in Columbia to Philadelphia. Engineers recommended that a rail route—the Philadelphia and Columbia Railroad—be constructed with an inclined plane at either end. The original route of the railroad was to pass north of Lancaster, but the city petitioned the state to alter it so that the railroad passed through downtown Lancaster. The Philadelphia and Columbia Railroad opened in 1834, originally with a horse-drawn passenger cars before steam locomotives replaced them as motive power. There are no photographs of the early Lancaster station, however the station would have most likely consisted of nothing more than an open-air, elevated platform, as was customary for train stations of that period. The station was located at North Queen and East Chestnut Street, with the platform possibly extending the length of the lot between Queen and Christian Streets.

=== Pennsylvania Railroad ===
In 1857, the Commonwealth of Pennsylvania sold the Main Line of Public Works to the Pennsylvania Railroad. The station was rebuilt in 1859 with a 250-by-85-foot (76 m × 26 m) structure supported by cast iron columns.

On April 28, 1929, the Pennsylvania Railroad completed a cutoff bypassing downtown Lancaster, closing the old station and opening the new depot.

=== Amtrak ===
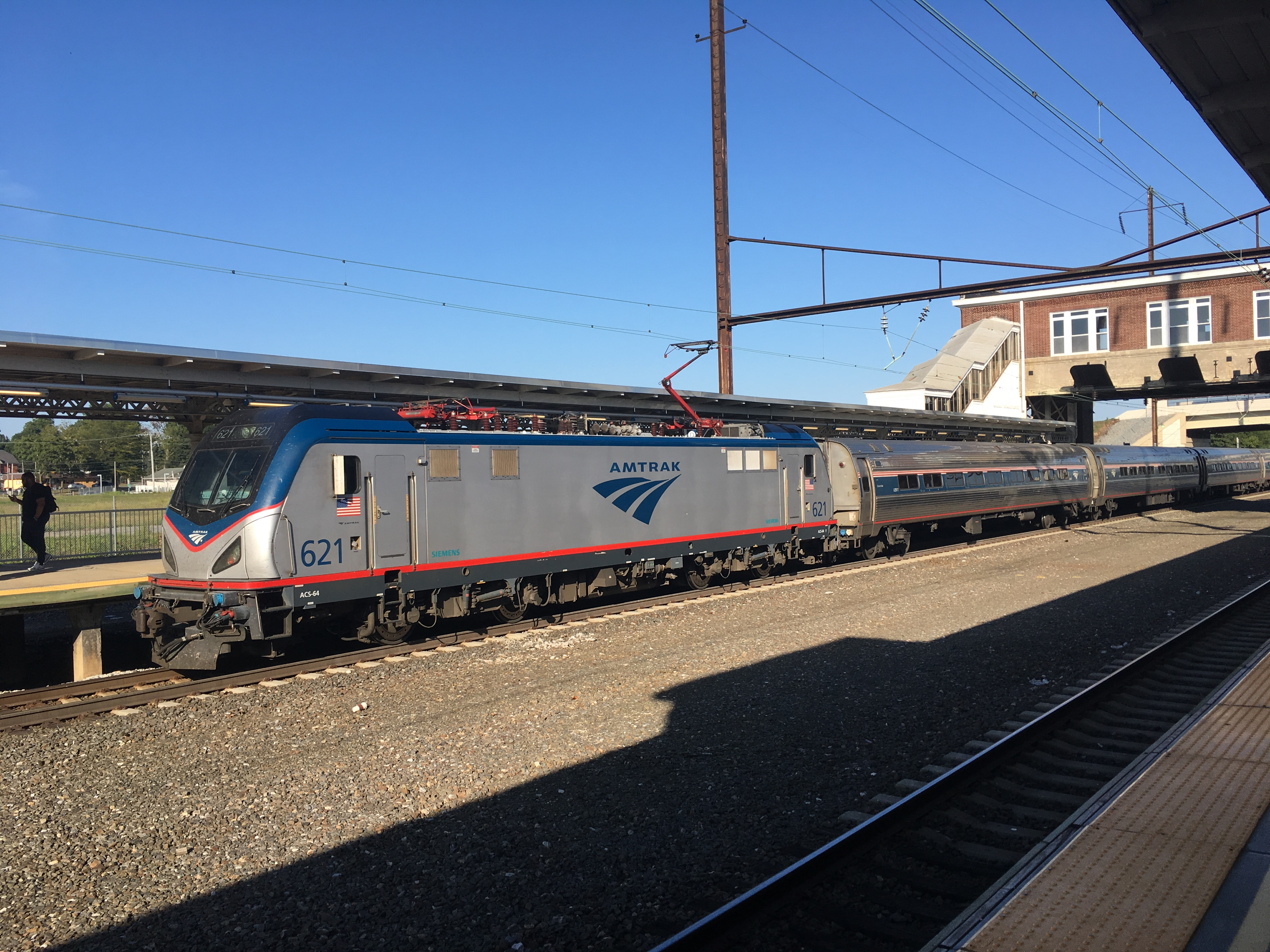
A westbound Amtrak Keystone Service train stops at the Lancaster station in 2019

Passenger rail was taken over by Amtrak in 1971. The former Pennsylvania Railroad train was continued by Amtrak Broadway Limited, while the Duquesne was renamed the Keystone. From 1971 to 1979, Amtrak's National Limited provided service from the station to New York and Kansas City, Missouri. Prior to the introduction of the Keystone Service in 1981, the Lancaster station was served by the Silverliner Service. From 1991 to 1995, the Atlantic City Express served the station on weekends. The Broadway Limited was discontinued in 1995 and replaced with the Three Rivers.

When the Lancaster City Historic District was listed on the National Register of Historic Places, the Lancaster station was designated a contributing property to the district on September 7, 2001.

==== Renovations ====
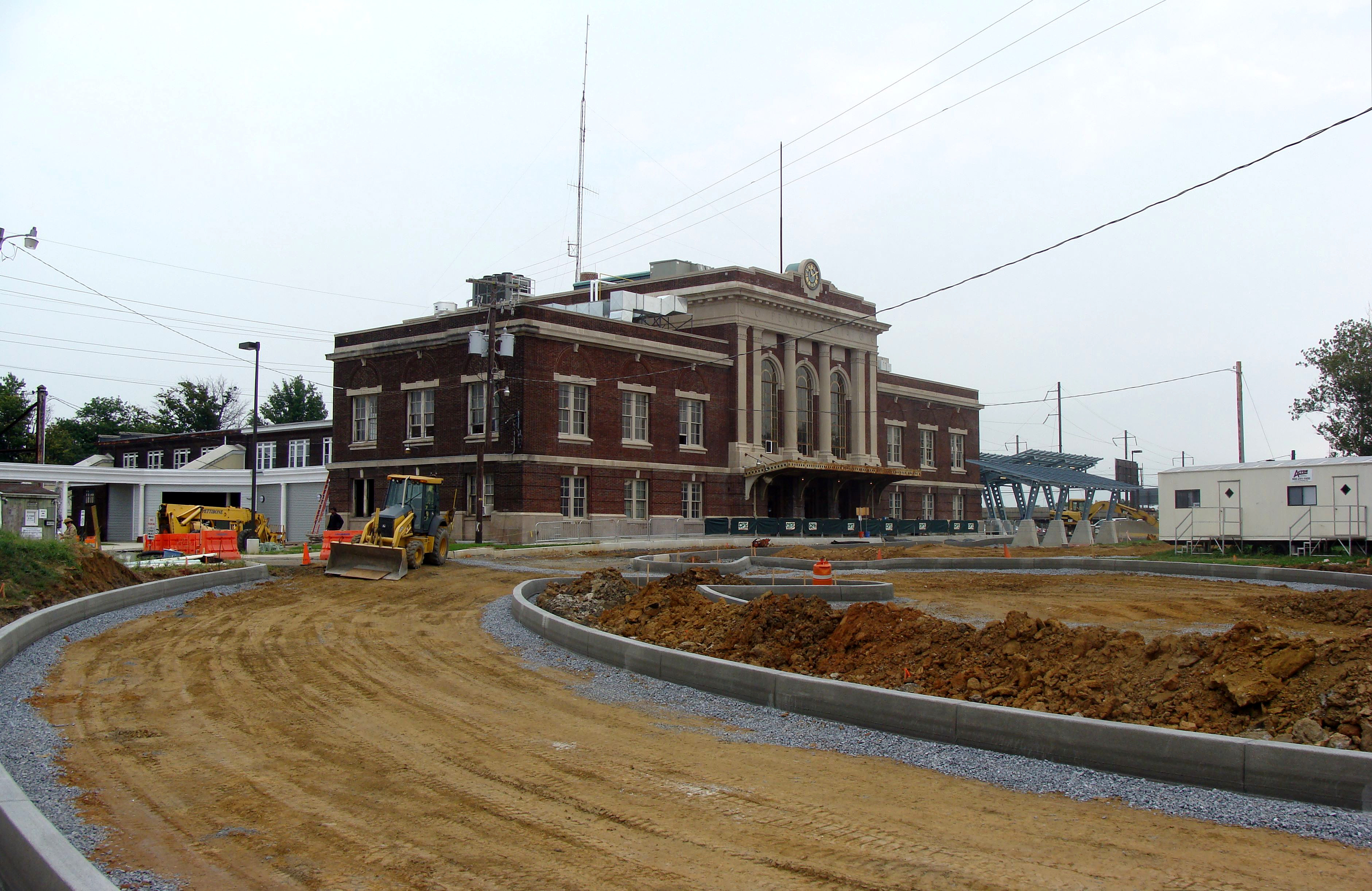
Lancaster station during the renovations, September 2011

After decades of deferred maintenance, a complete station refurbishment was proposed in 1997, but it was not until June 2009 that a $12 million renovation of the station was initiated by Amtrak and Lancaster County. Plans included a new HVAC system, improved ticketing and waiting area for intercity buses, an expanded parking lot, landscaping, a taxi stand, and "a complete rehabilitation of the station's interior and exterior". However, the start of construction was delayed until October. By September 2011, the renovations were estimated to cost $2 million over the planned amount and were a year behind schedule. After being completed, it was discovered that the bus bays at the station could not accommodate the 45-foot-long (14 m) coaches used by Bieber Transportation Group. The bays, which were being used as taxi stands instead, had been originally designed for the 40-foot (12 m) buses that had been used by the now-defunct Capital Trailways. The buses owned by Bieber, consequently, were unable to negotiate the turn in the parking lot leading to the bays. The curbs in the parking lots were eventually cut-back to allow more space for maneuvering. Intercity bus service was run by Bieber Transportation Group from the station to York, Philadelphia, and New York City until it was discontinued on April 1, 2018.

In January 2012, a "capstone" project was announced with the intention of restoring the interior of the station including the restoration of waiting area benches, painting and repairing of plaster walls, as well as upgrading of station lighting and accessibility. By October 2013, most of the interior restoration work, including refurbishment of windows, re-plastering and repainting of walls, and the installation of a new HVAC system, was completed.

The platforms were reconstructed in the 2020s. The south platform was completed in November 2024, followed by the north platform in November 2025. An artwork entitled A Place for Every Piece: Lancaster’s Living Quilt was added to the station in January 2025.

== See also ==
- List of Amtrak stations
- List of busiest Amtrak stations
- Transportation in Lancaster County, Pennsylvania

== Sources ==
- Ellis, Franklin; Evans, Samuel (1883). History of Lancaster County, Pennsylvania with Biographical Sketches of Many of it Prominent Men. Philadelphia: Everts & Peck.
- Hensel, W. U (March 1, 1907). "How the Pennsylvania Railroad Came Through Lancaster". Papers Read Before the Lancaster County Historical Society. XI (3). Lancaster County Historical Society: 75–113.
- Schafer, Mike; Soloman, Brian (2009). Pennsylvania Railroad. Minneapolis: Voyageur Press. ISBN 978-0-7603-2930-6.
- Cress, George; Eichinger, Daniel; Wuebber, Ingrid; White, Rebecca (September 2010). "Phase IB/II and Data-Recovery Archaeological Excavation at Site 36LA1494 Queen Street Station Phase II (RRTA) North Queen Street and East Chestnut Street" (PDF). Burlington, New Jersey: URS Corporation. ER 1997-1978-071. Archived from the original (PDF) on December 29, 2021.
