= Mount Joy station (Pennsylvania) =

Amtrak station in Mount Joy, Pennsylvania

Mount Joy, PA
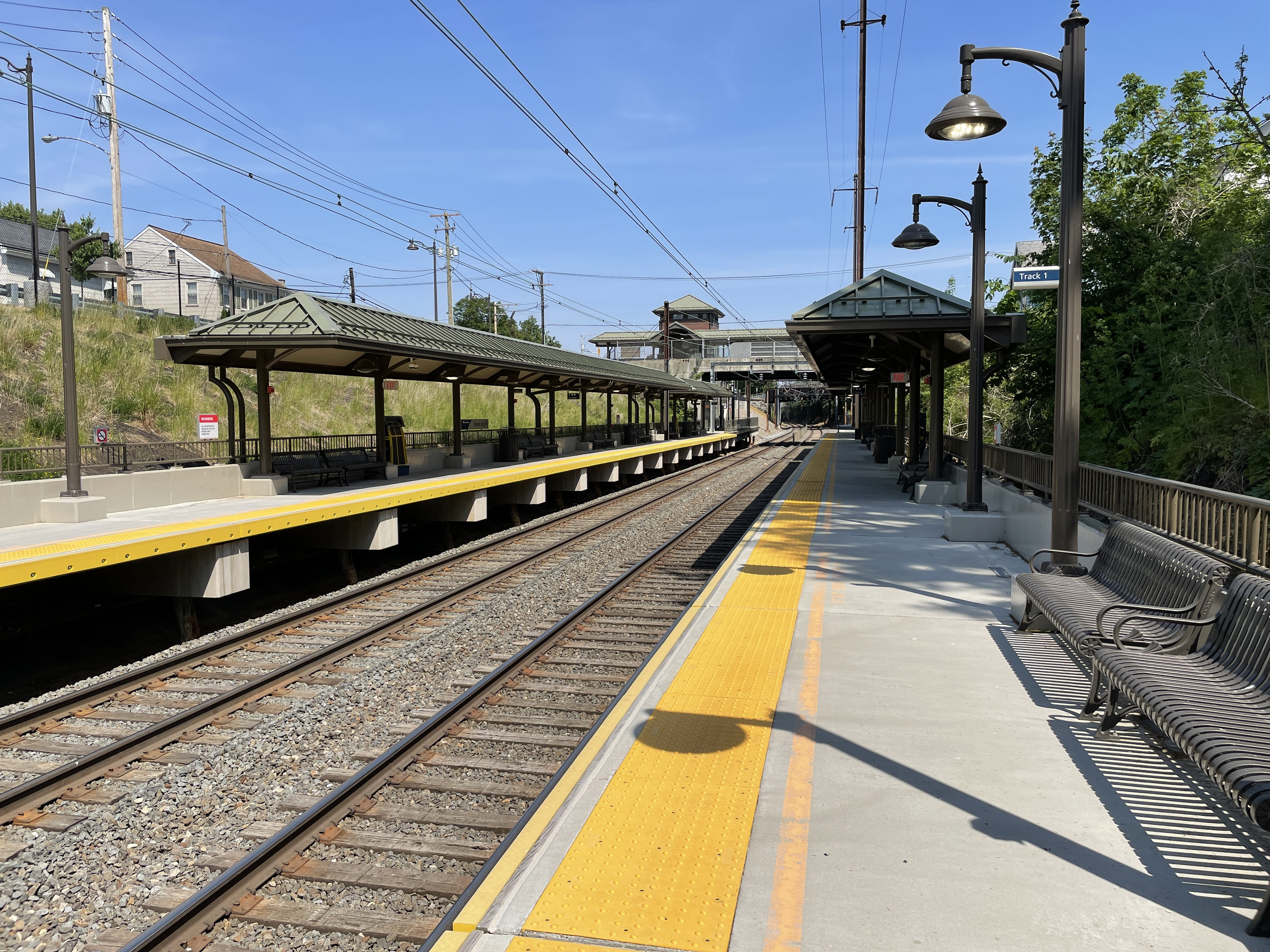
- Mount Joy station in May 2021

General information
- Location: 25 Market Street; Mount Joy, Pennsylvania; United States
- Coordinates: 40°6′31.5″N 76°30′10″W
- Owner: Amtrak
- Lines: Amtrak Keystone Corridor (Philadelphia to Harrisburg Main Line)
- Platforms: 2 side platforms
- Tracks: 2
- Connections: RRTA: 18

Construction
- Parking: Yes
- Accessible: Yes

Other information
- Station code: Amtrak: MJY

History
- Rebuilt: 2016–2019
- Electrified: January 15, 1938

Passengers
- FY 2025: 27,540 (Amtrak)

Services
Preceding station	Amtrak	Following station
Elizabethtown toward Harrisburg	Keystone Service	Lancaster toward New York
Pennsylvanian does not stop here
Former services
Preceding station	Pennsylvania Railroad	Following station
Florin toward Chicago	Main Line	Landisville toward New York or Exchange Place
Location

Mount Joy station is an Amtrak intercity railway station located about 13 miles northwest of Lancaster, Pennsylvania, at East Henry Street and North Market Street in Mount Joy, Pennsylvania. It is served by most Amtrak Keystone Service trains. The station formerly was a makeshift bus shelter in a railroad cut but replaced by an Americans With Disabilities Act of 1990-accessible platform. There is no ticket office at this station.

== History ==
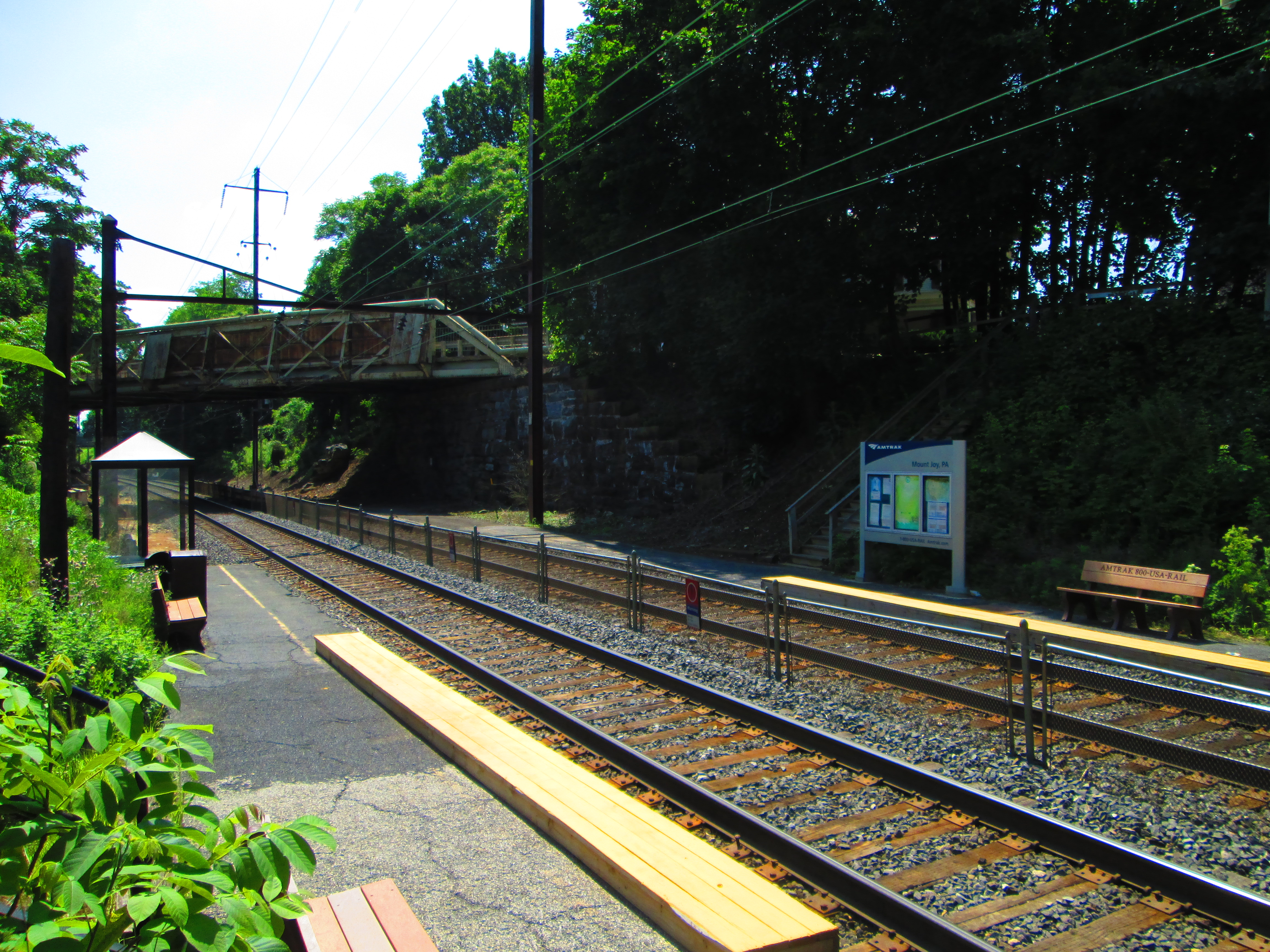
Mount Joy station in 2013, before it was rebuilt with high-level platforms

Mount Joy station was rebuilt between 2016 and 2019. The project raised the platforms to reduce dwell time, had platforms be covered with a canopy to protect passengers from the elements, added elevators in order to comply with Americans with Disabilities Act of 1990, and constructed a pedestrian walkway allowing easy access between the platforms. The slope was stabilized while additional parking spaces complemented an earlier phase where 69 parking spaces were added in 2012. Michael Baker International were the architects while Wagman was contracted to construct the new station. The station was rededicated on October 21, 2019 at a cost of $33 million, $8 million more than initially anticipated.
