= Franz Xaver Zettler =

German stained-glass artist

- Born: 1841
- Died: 1916 (aged 74–75)
- Occupation: Stained glass designer
- Relatives: Joseph Mayer (father-in-law)

Franz Xaver Zettler (1841-1916) was a German stained glass artist.

== Early life ==
Zettler was born on 21 August in Munich, Bavaria, Germany, his father, Franz Xaver Zettler, was 27 and his mother, Ursula Oppenrieder, was 28.

== Career ==
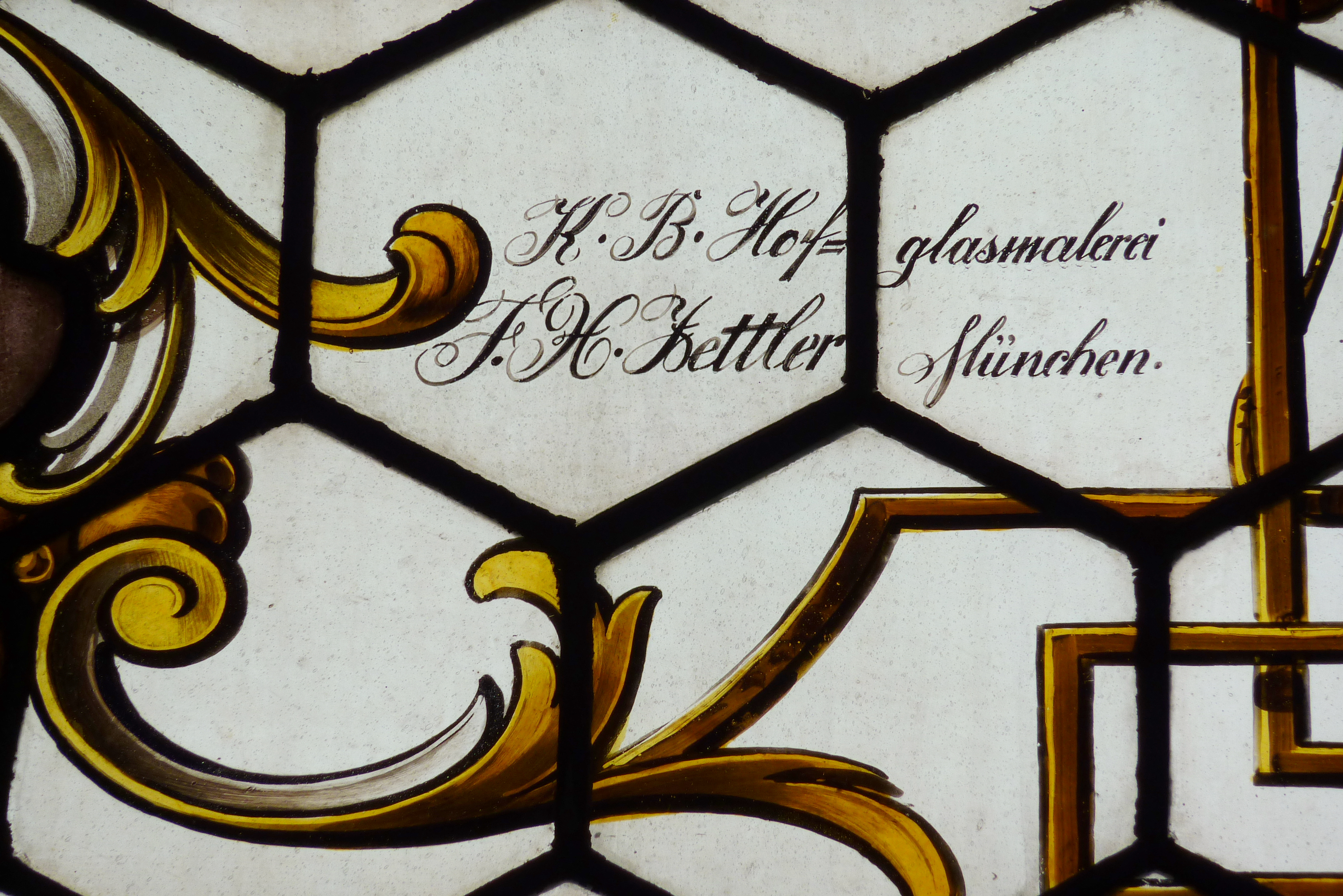
Signature of the company F.X. Zettler.

He started his own stained glass design company in 1870.

He designed some of the stained glass in the Deutsche Evangelische Christuskirche in Knightsbridge, London in 1904-1905. He designed a window depicting The Crucifixion that today stands in Badin Hall.

== Personal life ==
He married Anna Mayer. They were the parents of at least 3 sons and 1 daughter. His father-in-law, Joseph Gabriel Mayer (1808-83), was also a stained glass designer, who founded the firm of Franz Mayer of Munich.

== Death ==
He died on 27 March 1916, in München, Bavaria, at the age of 74, and was buried in Munich, Bavaria, Germany.

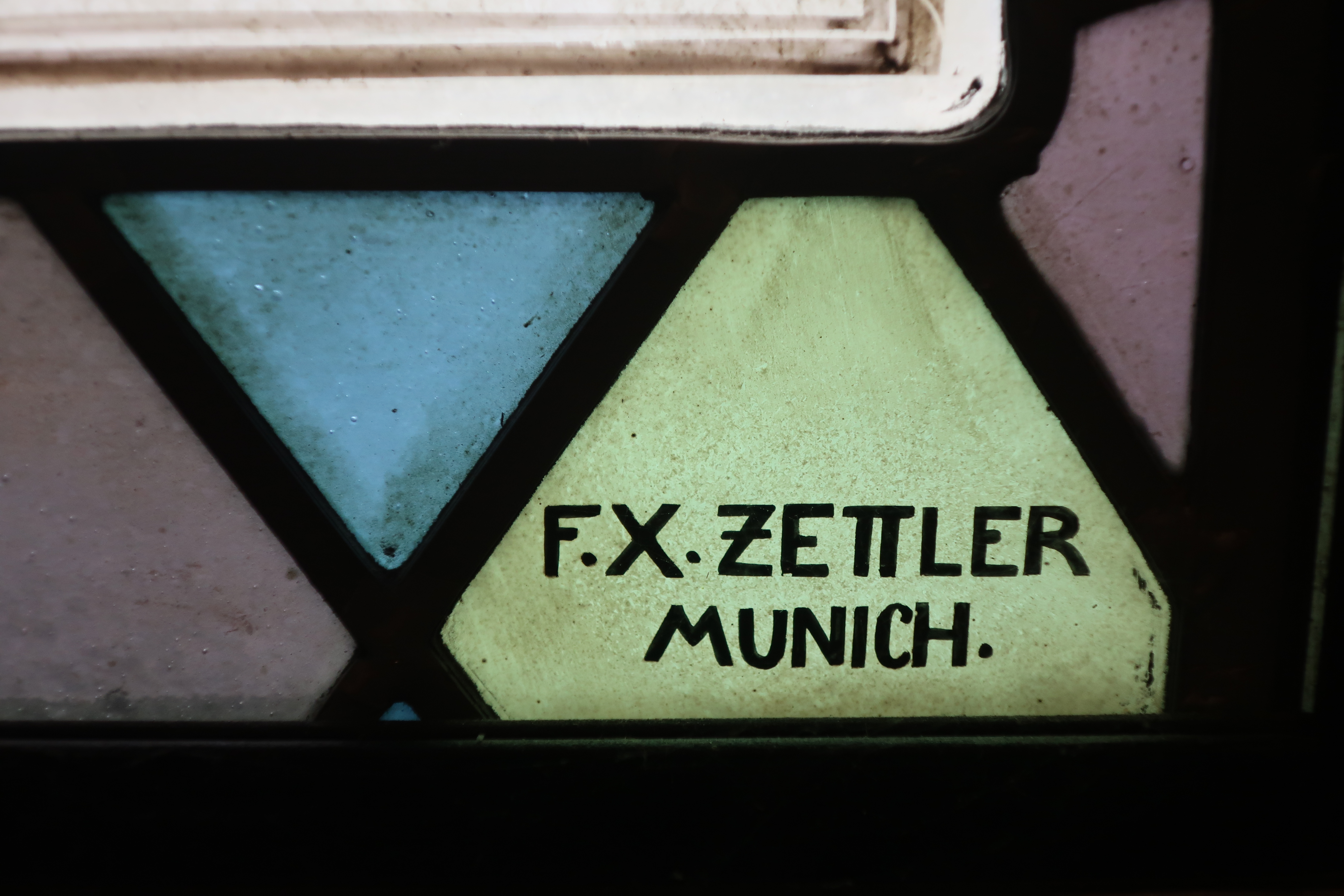
Signature at UU Church of Lancaster PA
