= Red Rose Transit Authority =

Public Transit Agency in Pennsylvania

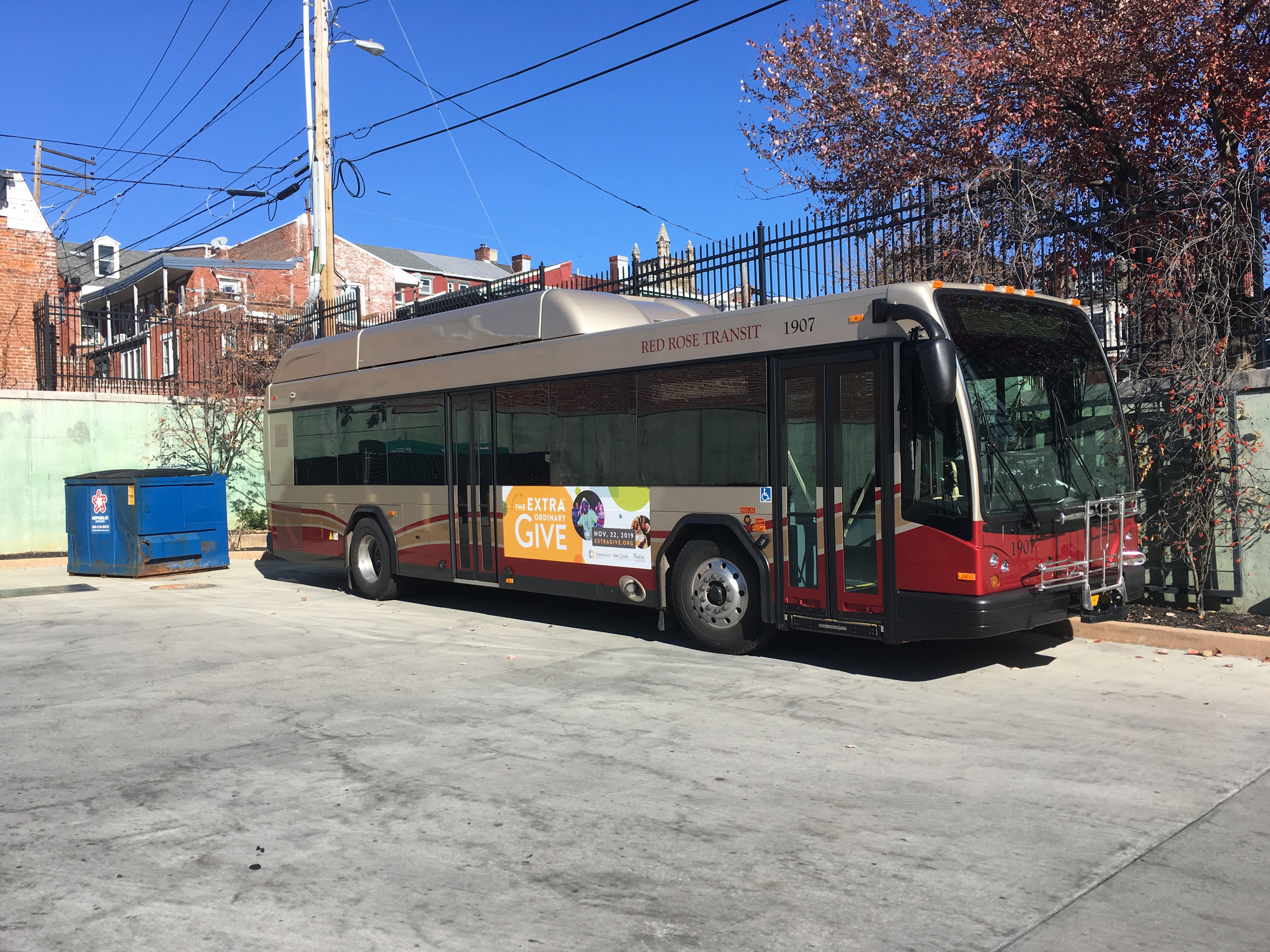
- RRTA bus 1907 at Queen Street Station in Lancaster, Pennsylvania
- Founded: April 1, 1976
- Headquarters: 45 Erick Road; Lancaster, Pennsylvania, U.S.
- Locale: Lancaster, Pennsylvania
- Service type: Bus
- Routes: 18
- Daily ridership: 13,400 (weekdays, Q2 2026)
- Annual ridership: 1,375,200 (2025)
- Chief executive: Dave Kilmer
- Website: redrosetransit.com

The Red Rose Transit Authority (RRTA) is a transit agency serving Lancaster County, Pennsylvania. RRTA is headquartered in downtown Lancaster. The South Central Transit Authority owns RRTA and the Berks Area Regional Transportation Authority (BARTA). In 2025, the system had a ridership of 1,375,200, or about 13,400 per weekday as of the second quarter of 2026.

RRTA has routes both within the city of Lancaster, and between Lancaster and other areas of the county. RRTA coordinates a paratransit service, Red Rose Access, which is run by three private transportation providers. RRTA also operates a loop route in downtown Lancaster.

Outside Lancaster city, RRTA buses will stop for passengers who hail them. Inside the city limits, riders must wait at designated stops.

== History ==
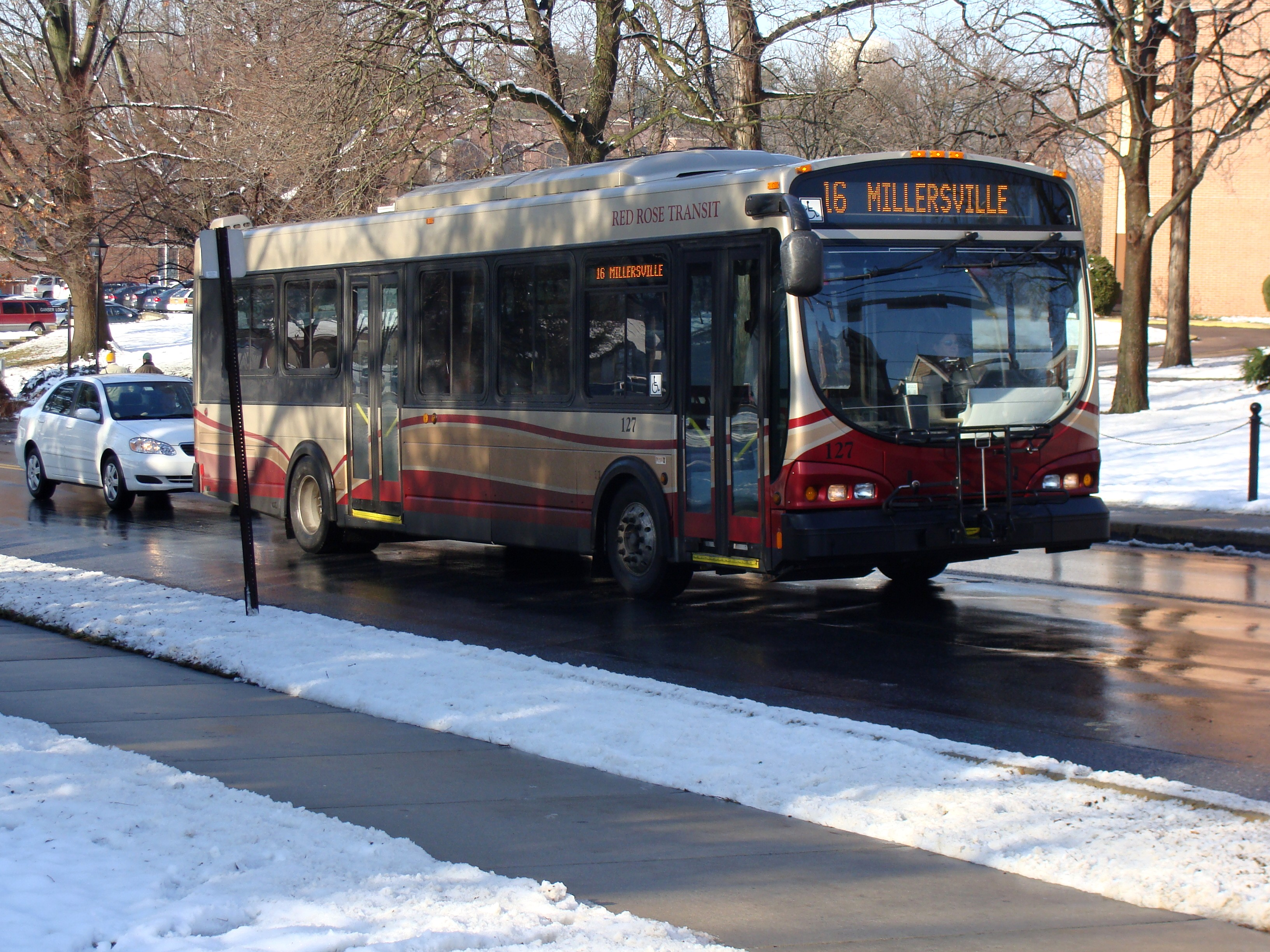
Route 16 bus in Millersville inbound to Lancaster

The RRTA was formed as an administrative agency by Lancaster city and Lancaster County under the Municipality Authorities Act of 1945. On April 1, 1976, the RRTA became an operating agency after it took over fixed-route service from two private companies. A new operations facility was built in 1979. In 1992, the RRTA consolidated with the Lancaster Integrated Specialized Transportation System, with the paratransit service renamed Red Rose Access.

The name "Red Rose" is a specific reference to the Red Rose of the House of Lancaster, associated lastly with King Henry VII of England.

The Queen Street Station transit center in downtown Lancaster was completed in 2005 on the former site of the Otto Paving and Construction Company building that was built in 1926. Construction on the second phase of the transit center began in September 2009, which added a parking garage, three bus bays, and access to Chestnut Street.

On December 1, 2014, the South Central Transit Authority was formed to oversee RRTA and the Berks Area Regional Transportation Authority (BARTA) in Berks County.

== Route list ==
Red Rose Transit Authority operates the following routes, most of which run on a hub and spoke type system out of Downtown Lancaster.

Route	Line Name	Terminals		Places Served	Notes
1	Northeast/Southeast	Queen Street Station	Queen Street Station	Queen Street, Lancaster Station, RRTA Operations Center, Lancaster General Hospital, Northeast Lancaster, J. P. McCaskey High School, Orange Street, Ewell Plaza, King Street, Garden Court Apartments, Southeast Lancaster, Church Street Towers, Farnum Street East, Queen Street, Lancaster County Convention Center	operates Monday-Sunday
3	Sterling Place-Kensington Court	Queen Street Station	Queen Street Station	Lancaster County Courthouse, Lancaster County Convention Center, Vine Street, Prince Street, Wabank Road, Sterling Place, Kensington Court, Manor Shopping Center, Manor Street, Lancaster County Assistance Office, King Street, Umbrella Works Apartments	operates Monday-Sunday
5	Golden Triangle	Queen Street Station	Queen Street Station	Chestnut Street, Plum Street, New Holland Avenue, Lancaster Science Factory, J. P. McCaskey High School, Grandview Plaza, Pleasure Road, Oregon Boulevard, Calvary Fellowship Homes, Fordney Road, Golden Triangle Shopping Center, Lancaster Shopping Center	operates Monday-Sunday
6	Hawthrone Centre-Walmart	Queen Street Station	Queen Street Station	Queen Street, PA Careerlink of Lancaster, Manheim Pike, Red Rose Commons, Shoppes at Belmont, Fruitville Pike, Hawthrone Centre Walmart, Keller Avenue, Lancaster Station, Prince Street	operates Monday-Sunday, formerly the Historic Downtown Trolley until August 22, 2019, when trolleys were retired and replaced with buses
8	Park City-Penn State Health	Queen Street Station	Queen Street Station	Franklin & Marshall College, Harrisburg Pike, Wegmans, Park City Center, Parkview Plaza, Women & Babies Hospital, Penn Medicine/LGH Health Campus, Penn State Health Lancaster Medical Center	operates Monday-Sunday
10	Lititz	Queen Street Station	Newport and Tollgate roads in Lititz	Queen Street/Duke Street, Liberty Street/McGovern Avenue, Lancaster Station, Golden Triangle Shopping Center, Lancaster Shopping Center, Lititz Pike, Neffsville, Kissel Hill, Kissel Hill Plaza, Lititz	operates Monday-Saturday
11	Ephrata	Queen Street Station	Walmart in Ephrata	Queen Street/Duke Street, Liberty Street/McGovern Avenue, Lancaster Station, Lancaster Shopping Center, Oregon Pike, Pennsylvania Route 272, Dutch Lanes Bowling Center, Akron, State Street, Main Street, U.S. Route 322	operates Monday-Saturday
12	New Holland	Queen Street Station	Pennsylvania Route 23 and Tower Road in New Holland or Shady Maple Smorgasbord	Orange Street/Chestnut Street, Grandview Shopping Center, New Holland Avenue, Pennsylvania Route 23, Eden, Leola	operates Monday-Saturday, limited service to Shady Maple Smorgasbord
13	White Horse	Binns Park on North Queen Street	Old Philadelphia Pike and Churchtown Road in Cains	Orange Street/Chestnut Street, King Street, Thaddeus Stevens College of Technology, Conestoga View Nursing Home, Harrisburg Area Community College, Pennsylvania Route 340, Bird-in-Hand, Intercourse, White Horse	operates Monday-Saturday
14	Rockvale Square	Queen Street Station	Rockvale Square	Orange Street/Chestnut Street, King Street, Thaddeus Stevens College of Technology, Conestoga View Nursing Home, Lincoln Highway, Walmart, East Towne Centre, Tanger Outlets, Dutch Wonderland, Quality Outlet Shopping Center	operates Monday-Sunday
15	Willow Street	Queen Street Station	Willow Valley Square in Willow Street	Queen Street/Prince Street, Willow Street Pike, Kendig Square, Willow Valley Manor, Willow Valley Lakes Manor, Peach Bottom Road, Willow Street Pike	operates Monday-Saturday
16	Millersville	Queen Street Station	Hillview Drive and Lee Avenue in Millersville	Manor Avenue, Manor Center Weis Market, Millersville Pike, Manor Avenue, Millersville University	operates Monday-Sunday
17	Columbia	Queen Street Station	3rd and Linden streets in Columbia or Marietta Square in Marietta	Orange Street/King Street, Stone Mill Plaza, Columbia Avenue, Pennsylvania Route 462, Mountville, The Shops at Prospect, Columbia	operates Monday-Sunday, limited service to Marietta
18	Elizabethtown/Mount Joy	Queen Street Station	Elizabethtown Station or Nordstrom Distribution Center	Chestnut Street/Walnut Street, Lancaster Regional Medical Center, Marietta Avenue, Landisville, Pennsylvania Route 230, Mount Joy, Elizabethtown	operates Monday-Saturday, limited service to Nordstrom Distribution Center
19	Manheim	Queen Street Station	Hazel and High streets in Manheim	Queen Street/Prince Street, Lancaster Station, Red Rose Commons, Fruitville Pike, Hawthorne Plaza, Granite Run Industrial Park, Pennsylvania Route 72, East Petersburg, Manheim	operates Monday-Saturday
20	Greenfield	Queen Street Station	Queen Street Station	Orange Street/Chestnut Street, King Street, Thaddeus Stevens College of Technology, Lancaster Nursing & Rehab Center, Harrisburg Area Community College, Lowe's, Costco, Social Security Administration, Greenfield Estates, Saint Joseph's University in Lancaster, Thaddeus Stevens College of Technology Transportation Center	operates Monday-Saturday
21	Gap	Queen Street Station	Gap Shopping Center	Orange Street/Chestnut Street, King Street, Thaddeus Stevens College of Technology, Conestoga View Nursing Home, Lincoln Highway, Walmart, East Towne Centre, Tanger Outlets, Dutch Wonderland, Quality Outlet Shopping Center, Rockvale Square, U.S. Route 30, Paradise, Kinzers, Urban Outfitters Distribution Center, Gap	operates Monday-Saturday
MU X	MU Xpress	SMC at Millersville University	SMC at Millersville University	Millersville University	operates Monday-Friday when university is in session, loop route around campus

== Fares ==
RRTA bus fares are based on zones radiating out from Lancaster. Students in K-12 schools pay a reduced fare. Millersville University students with their university ID can ride the Route 16, MU Xpress, and MU Park City Xpress for free when the university is in session. Persons with disabilities pay half fare, and senior citizens age 65 or older ride RRTA buses for free.

== Transit facilities ==
=== Queen Street Station ===
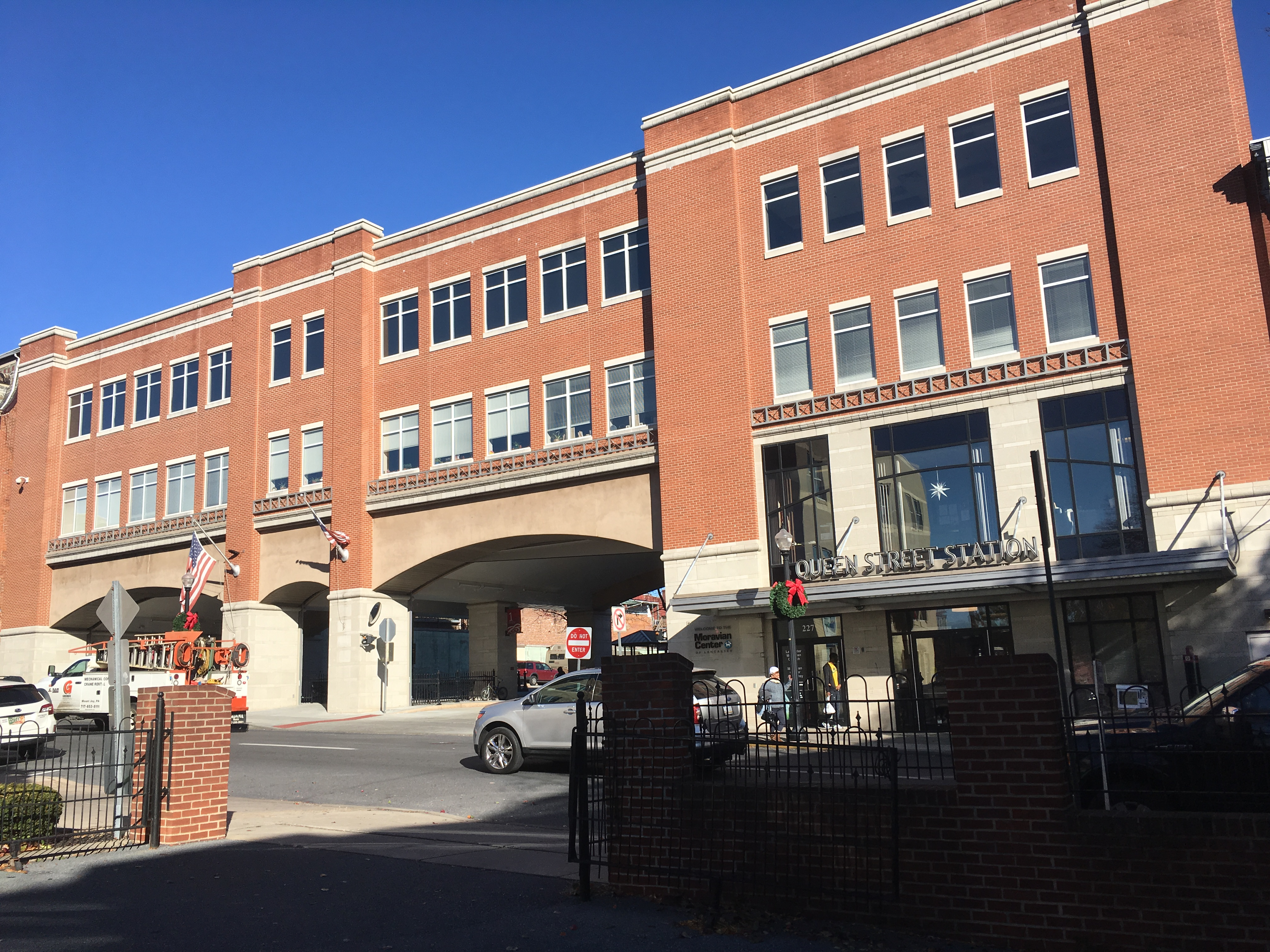
Queen Street Station in downtown Lancaster

The Queen Street Station transit center located in downtown Lancaster serves 11 of RRTA's bus routes. The transit center contains shelters and benches in a park-like setting for riders waiting for their buses. The RRTA Information Center is located at Queen Street Station and contains a waiting area, restrooms, sales outlet, bike racks, snack machines, ATM, and television. A parking garage with 395 spaces is located adjacent to Queen Street Station.

=== Park and ride locations ===
RRTA operates nine park and ride lots across Lancaster County:

- Clipper Magazine Stadium (Route 6)
- Former Kmart in Columbia (Route 17)
- Dutch Lanes Bowling Center (Route 11)
- Former Kmart in Ephrata (Route 11)
- Hawthorne Center (Route 19)
- Kendig Square (Route 15)
- Walmart in Lancaster (Route 14)
- RRTA Operations Center (Route 1)
- Willow Valley Square (Route 15)

== Fleet ==
Fleet number(s)	Year	Manufacturer	Model	Engine	Transmission
185-187	2013	Gillig	BRT HEV 35'	Cummins ISB6.7 EPA13	BAE System HybriDrive
188-197	2015	Gillig	BRT HEV 35'	Cummins ISB6.7 EPA13	BAE System HybriDrive
1601-1604	2016	Gillig	BRT HEV 35'	Cummins ISB6.7 EPA13	BAE System 200 HybriDrive
1701-1705	2017	Gillig	BRT HEV 35'	Cummins B6.7 EPA17	BAE System 200 HybriDrive
1706-1708	2017	Gillig	BRT HEV 40'	Cummins B6.7 EPA17	BAE System 200 HybriDrive
1813-1814	2018	Gillig	BRT HEV 35'	Cummins B6.7 EPA17	BAE System 200 HybriDrive
1815-1817	2018	Gillig	BRT 29'	Cummins L9 EPA17	Voith D864.6
1906-1911	2019	Gillig	BRT HEV 35'	Cummins B6.7 EPA17	BAE System 200 HybriDrive
2101-2103	2021	Gillig	Low Floor Plus HEV 35'	Cummins B6.7 EPA17	BAE System 200 HybriDrive
2206	2022	Gillig	Low Floor Plus HEV 35'	Cummins B6.7 EPA21	BAE System 200 HybriDrive
2401-2402, 2441	2024	Gillig	Low Floor Plus HEV 35'	Cummins B6.7 EPA21	BAE System 200 HybriDrive
2501-2502	2025	Gillig	Low Floor Plus HEV 35'	Cummins B6.7 EPA21	BAE System 200 HybriDrive
