= Buck Run (West Branch Brandywine Creek tributary) =

Physical characteristics
- Source
  - location: south of State Hill in West Sadsbury Township, Chester County, Pennsylvania
  - elevation: between 680 and 700 feet (200 m)
- Mouth
  - location: West Branch Brandywine Creek in Newlin Township, Chester County, Pennsylvania
  - coordinates: 39°56′11″N 75°46′29″W
  - elevation: 226 ft (69 m)
- Length: 17.2 mi (27.7 km)
- Basin size: 48.60 mi^{2} (125.9 km^{2})
- Discharge
  - average: 20.3 cu ft/s (0.57 m^{3}/s)

Basin features
- Progression: West Branch Brandywine Creek → Brandywine Creek → Christina River → Delaware River → Delaware Bay
- Tributaries
  - right: Doe Run, Birch Run

Buck Run is a tributary of West Branch Brandywine Creek in Chester County, Pennsylvania, in the United States. It is approximately 17.2 miles (27.7 km) long and flows through West Sadsbury Township, Sadsbury Township, Pomeroy, Highland Township, East Fallowfield Township, West Marlborough Township, and Newlin Township. The watershed of the stream has an area of 48.6 square miles (126 km^{2}). Its named tributaries include Doe Run and Birch Run. The stream's waters are slightly alkaline and contain various dissolved metals and nonmetals. Rock formations of shale, sandstone, and limestone occur in the watershed. Three covered bridges and several other bridges have been built over the stream. Additionally, a number of mills historically operated along the stream. Mayflies, stoneflies, and caddisflies inhabit the vicinity of the stream. Additionally, trout inhabit the stream.

== Course ==
Buck Run begins south of State Hill in West Sadsbury Township. It flows southeast for several tenths of a mile, crossing Pennsylvania Route 10 and entering Sadsbury Township. The stream turns south, east, and south again, crossing U.S. Route 30. The stream then flows southeast for over a mile in a valley before turning south and flowing along the western border of Pomeroy. South of Pomeroy, it flows southeast on the border between Highland Township and East Fallowfield Township for a few miles before turning south and continuing to follow the border. In this area, the stream receives the tributary Birch Run. It then begins meandering east-northeast for several miles in East Fallowfield Township and West Marlborough Township. After this, the stream turns southeast and receives the tributary Doe Run. Birch Run then turns northeast and enters Newlin Township, where it flows south-southeast for several miles until it reaches its confluence with Brandywine Creek.

Buck Run joins Brandywine Creek 10.50 miles (16.90 km) upstream of its mouth.

=== Tributaries ===
Buck Run has two named tributaries: Birch Run and Doe Run. Birch Run joins Buck Run 7.85 miles (12.63 km) upstream of its mouth. Its watershed has an area of 5.30 square miles (13.7 km^{2}). Doe Run joins Buck Run 2.50 miles (4.02 km) upstream of its mouth. Its watershed has an area of 21.70 square miles (56.2 km^{2}).

== Hydrology ==
The discharge of Buck Run ranges from 3.9 to 44 cubic feet per second, with an average of 20.3 cubic feet per second. Between 1998 and 2013, the temperature of the stream on October, November, and December mornings ranged from 3.8 to 15.0 °C (38.8 to 59.0 °F). The stream is generally slightly alkaline, with a pH ranging from 7.0 to 7.8. The specific conductance of its waters ranges from 231 to 285 micro-siemens per centimeter. The concentration of dissolved oxygen in the waters of Buck Run ranges from 9.2 to 14.5 milligrams per liter.

The concentration of dissolved boron in the waters of Buck Run ranges from 9 to 27 micrograms per liter. The concentrations of dissolved sodium and magnesium range between 7.9 and 11.6 and 7.7 and 9.4 milligrams per liter, respectively. The concentrations of dissolved potassium and calcium range between 1.90 and 3.17 and 19.1 and 27.5 milligrams per liter, respectively. The iron concentration ranges from 21 to 138 milligrams per liter.

The concentration of fluorides in the waters of Buck Run ranges from less than 0.04 to less than 0.17 milligrams per liter and the concentration of chlorides ranges from 17.0 to 31.0 milligrams per liter. The concentration of silica ranges between 7.1 and 10.1 milligrams per liter and the orthophosphate concentration ranges between 0.004 and less than 0.020 milligrams per liter. The sulfate concentration ranges from 15.7 to 19.0 milligrams per liter. The concentration of ammonia ranges from less than 0.010 to approximately 0.040 milligrams per liter, the nitrate concentration ranges between 2.76 and 5.94 milligrams per liter, and the concentration of nitrites ranges between 0.004 and 0.016 milligrams per liter.

== Geography and geology ==
The elevation near the mouth of Buck Run is 226 feet (69 m) above sea level. The elevation of the stream's source is between 680 and 700 feet (210 and 210 m) above sea level. The gradient of Buck Run between its source and its mouth is 31.8 feet (9.7 m) per mile.

The course of Buck Run is described as circuitous in a 1921 book. The stream generally flows in a southeasterly direction. Its channel is sinuous. The topography of the stream's watershed has been described as "broken and hilly". However, in some places, the stream flows through a narrow valley flanked by steep hills.

Buck Run mostly flows through rock formations consisting of shale and sandstone. However, there are also some limestone formations in the vicinity of the stream.

The average annual rate of precipitation in the watershed of Buck Run ranges from 40 to 50 inches (100 to 130 cm).

== Watershed ==
The watershed of Buck Run has an area of 48.60 square miles (125.9 km^{2}). There are 80 miles (130 km) of streams in the watershed of Buck Run. The watershed occupies portions of 11 municipalities. The mouth of the stream is in the United States Geological Survey quadrangle of Coatesville. However, its source is in the United States Geological Survey quadrangle of Parkesburg.

In the early 1900s, the predominant land use in the watershed of Buck Run was agriculture.

== History and industries ==
Buck Run was entered into the Geographic Names Information System on August 2, 1979. Its identifier in the Geographic Names Information System is 1170547.

Numerous bridges have been built over Buck Run. One was constructed in 1881 and two more were built in 1914, one of which was repaired in 2012. A bridge was built over the stream and its tributary Doe Run in 1915. Another five bridges were built over the stream between 1926 and 1930 and two more in 1937 and 1940. The three newest bridges over it were constructed in 1969, 1975, and 2002. Additionally, there are three covered bridges over the creek. Two of them, the Mary Ann Pyle Bridge and the Hayes Clark Bridge are on private property. They were built in 1881 and 1971, respectively. The third covered bridge is the Speakman Bridge.

William Dickie owned a mill on Buck Run at Sadsbury shortly after 1722. Historically, there were six or seven papermills on the stream in one township. One of these mills, the Rokeby Papermill, was said to be at the same location as the first rolling mill in the United States. Two rolling mills known as the Rokeby Rolling Mill and the Laurel Rolling Mill also historically existed on the stream. The former was built in 1795 and the latter was built in 1825. The Laurel Rolling Mill was located at the mouth of Buck Run. Additionally, a slitting mill constructed by Isaac Pennock was constructed on the stream.

The East Sadsbury Meeting was established in the vicinity of Buck Run and the Lancaster Pike. The meeting was typically small and eventually was no longer held.

Buck Run was historically considered to be the north branch of Doe Run.

In the early 1900s, the main industry in the watershed of Buck Run was agriculture. Additionally, the tributary Doe Run served as water power for several mills. Historically, the Pennsylvania Railroad crossed the watershed of Buck Run and ran alongside it between Pomeroy and the community of Buck Run. In the early 1900s, major communities in the watershed included Parkesburg, Pomeroy, Doe Run, and Sadsburyville. In 1921, their populations were 2522, 365, 200, and 150, respectively.

== Biology ==
The taxa richness of Buck Run at Doe Run ranges from 40 to 55. The EPT taxa richness (the number of mayfly, stonefly, and caddisfly taxa) ranges from 18 to 28. The HBI value of the stream at this location ranges from 3.50 to 4.28. All of these values indicate "excellent stream quality". The stream is the only wildlife corridor to cross US Route 30 in Chester County.

Buck Run is considered to be approved trout waters. However, it is not considered to be a High-Quality Coldwater Fishery or Exceptional Value stream.

== See also ==
- List of rivers of Pennsylvania
