= Speakman No. 2, Mary Ann Pyle Bridge =

- U.S. National Register of Historic Places
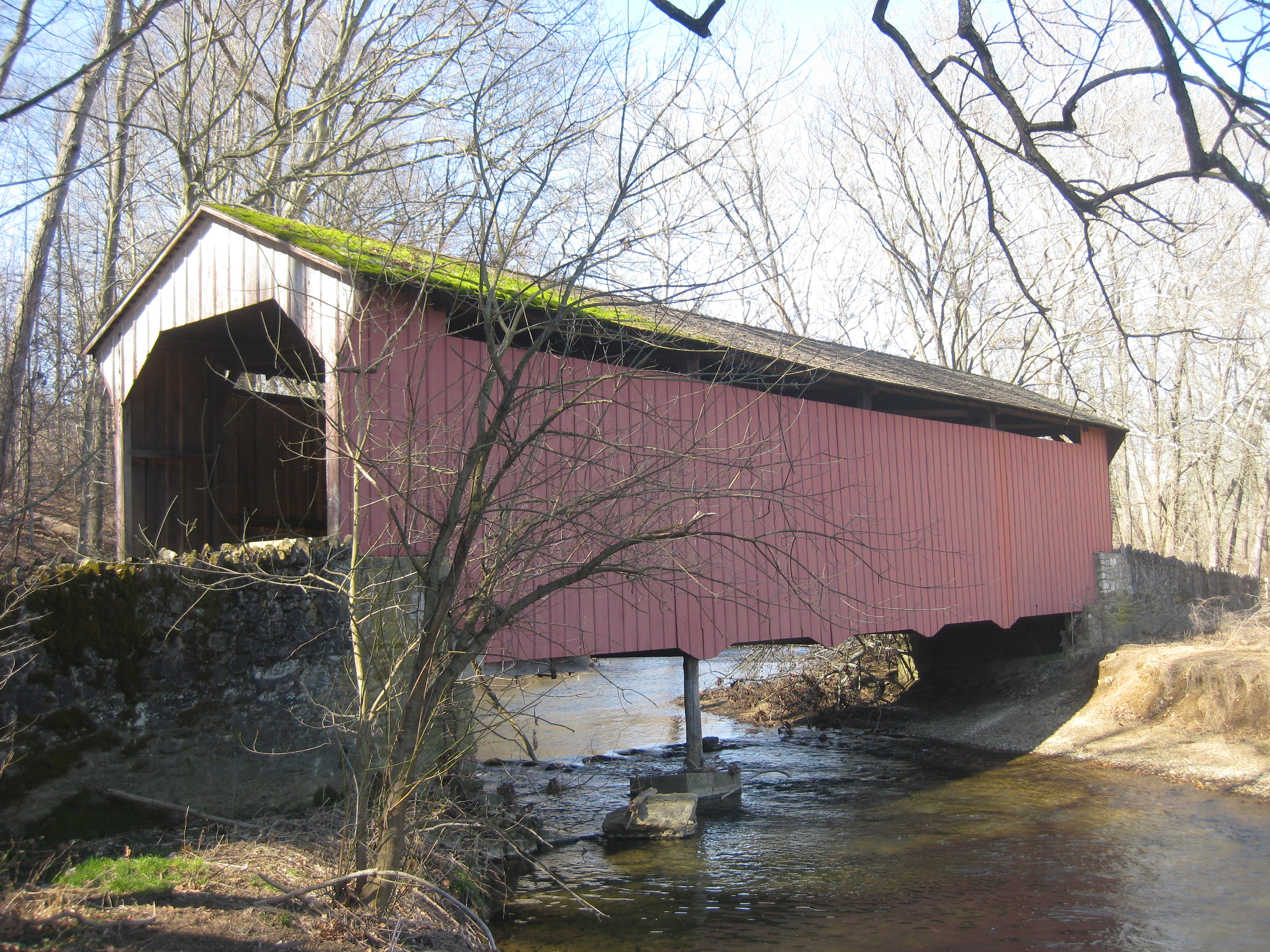
- Speakman No 2 Mary Ann Pyle Bridge, February 2012

- Location within Pennsylvania Location within the United States
- Location: South of Coatesville on Township 371, near Modena, East Fallowfield Township, Pennsylvania
- Coordinates: 39°55′19″N 75°48′1″W
- Area: less than one acre
- Built: 1881
- Built by: Meanander & Ferdinand Wood
- Architectural style: Burr truss
- MPS: Covered Bridges of Chester County TR
- NRHP reference No.: 80003465
- Added to NRHP: December 10, 1980

Speakman No. 2, Mary Ann Pyle Bridge is a historic wooden covered bridge located at East Fallowfield Township near Modena in Chester County, Pennsylvania. It is a 75-foot-long (23 m) Burr Truss bridge, constructed in 1881. It is a twin of Speakman No. 1, located a 1/4 mile away. It crosses Buck Run.

It was listed on the National Register of Historic Places in 1980.
