= Speakman No. 1 =

- U.S. National Register of Historic Places
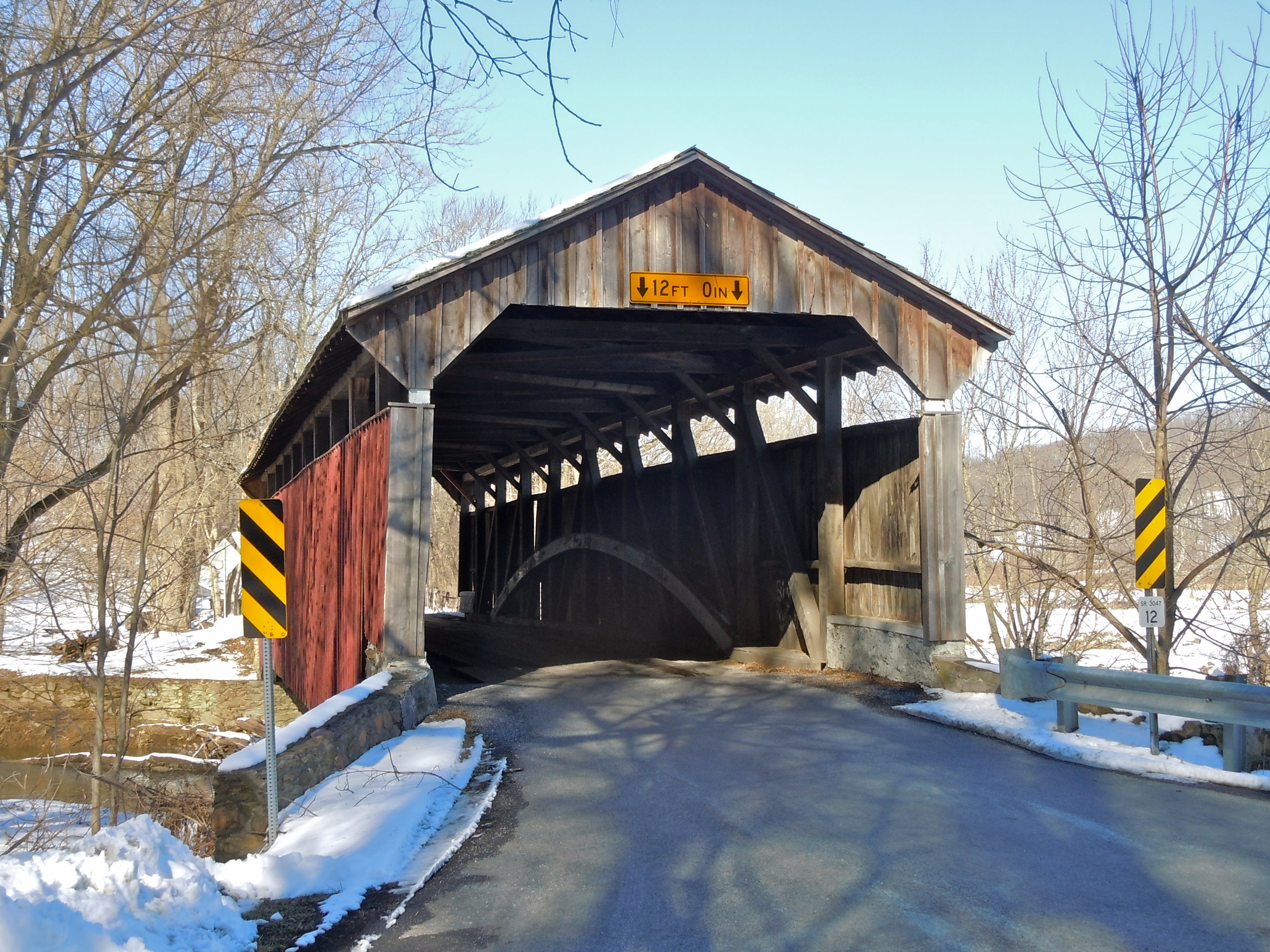
- Speakman No. 1, February 2011

- Location within Pennsylvania Location within the United States
- Location: South of Coatesville on Legislative Route 15068, near Modena, East Fallowfield Township, Pennsylvania
- Coordinates: 39°55′46″N 75°49′23″W
- Area: less than one acre
- Built: 1881
- Built by: Meanander & Ferdinand Wood
- Architectural style: Burr truss
- MPS: Covered Bridges of Chester County TR
- NRHP reference No.: 80003464
- Added to NRHP: December 10, 1980

Speakman No. 1 is a historic wooden covered bridge located at East Fallowfield Township near Modena in Chester County, Pennsylvania. It is a 75-foot-long (23 m) Burr Truss bridge, constructed in 1881. It is a twin of Speakman No. 2, Mary Ann Pyle Bridge, located a 1/4 mile away. It crosses Buck Run.

It was listed on the National Register of Historic Places in 1980.

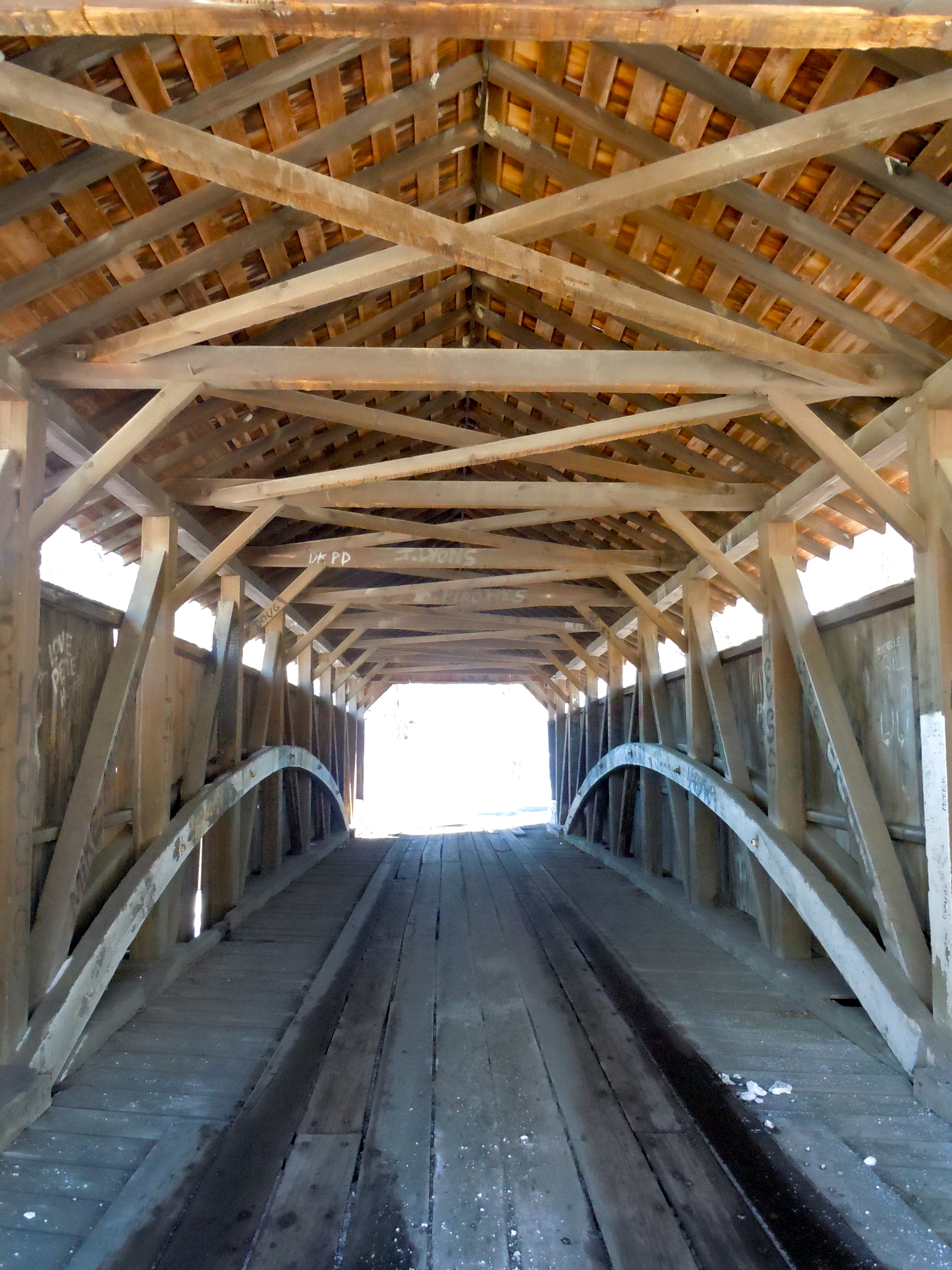
interior of the bridge
