= Parkesburg National Bank =

Historic building in Parkesburg, Chester County, Pennsylvania

- U.S. National Register of Historic Places
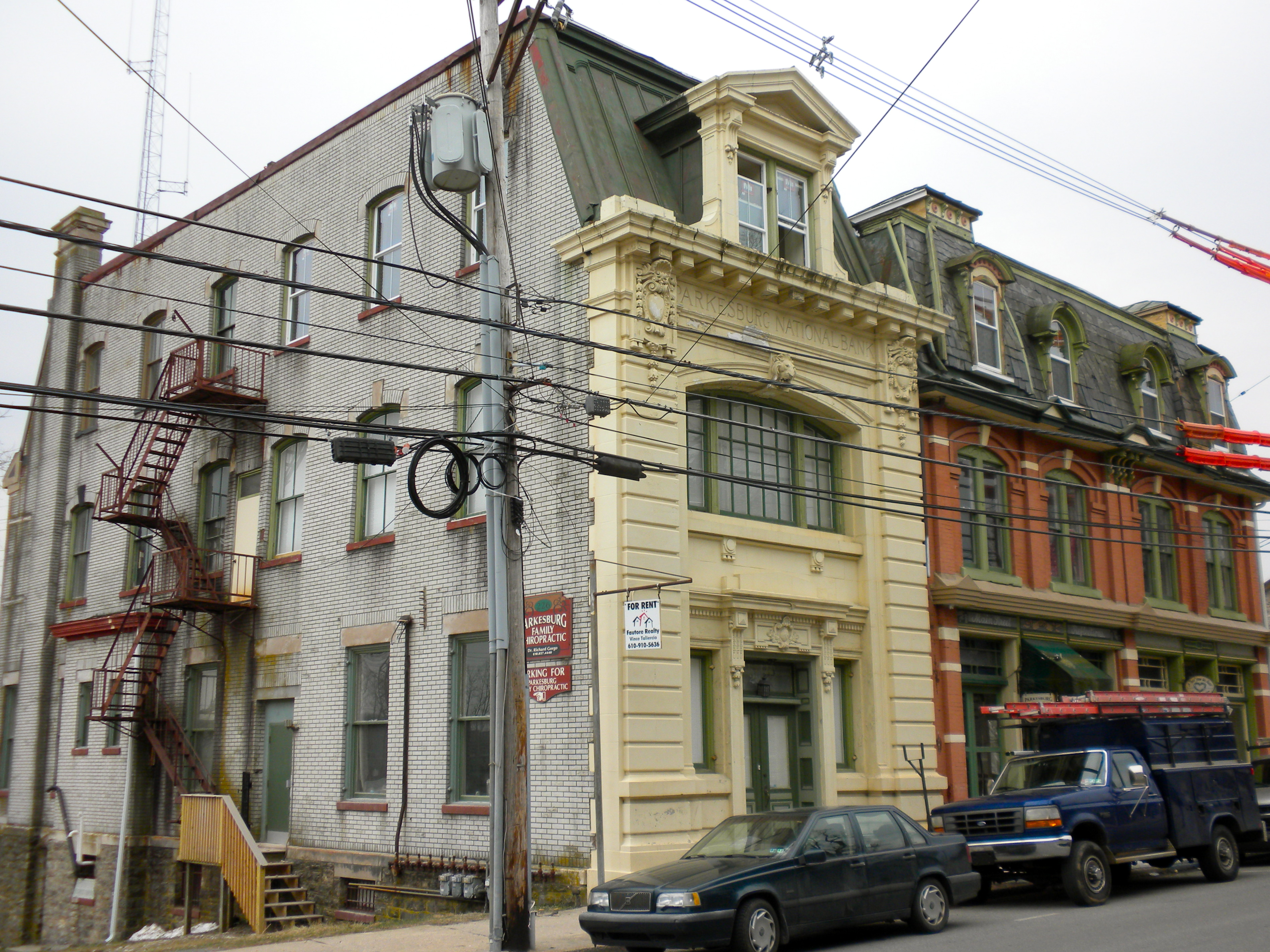
- Parkesburg National Bank, March 2010

- Location within Pennsylvania Location within the United States
- Location: Gay and Main Sts., Parkesburg, Pennsylvania
- Coordinates: 39°57′35″N 75°55′22″W
- Area: 0.2 acres (0.081 ha)
- Built: 1883, c. 1900
- Architectural style: Classical Revival, Second Empire
- NRHP reference No.: 80003467
- Added to NRHP: August 29, 1980

The Parkesburg National Bank is an historic bank building in Parkesburg, Chester County, Pennsylvania, United States.

It was added to the National Register of Historic Places in 1980.

== History and architectural features ==
This historic structure was built in two sections; the older dates to 1883 and the second to circa 1900. Both are three-story, brick structures that sit on banked basements. The older section has a patterned slate mansard roof with rounded dormer windows and was designed in the Second Empire style. The addition is faced in concrete, with floral patterns, a lion's head, and the bank's insignia. It generally represents the Classical Revival style. The building has been converted to apartments.
