= Sadsburyville, Pennsylvania =

Unincorporated community in Pennsylvania, US

- Unincorporated community
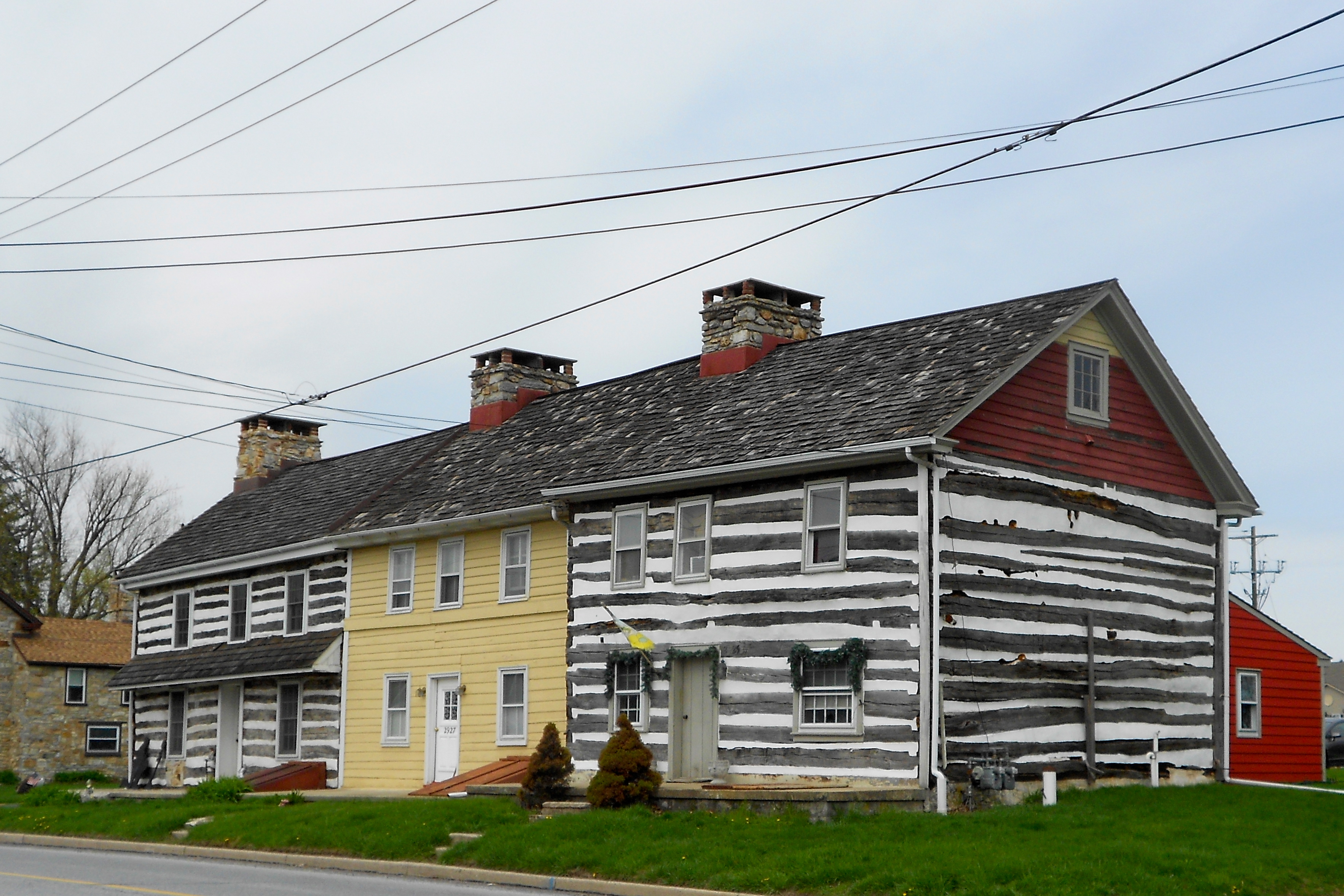

- Location within Pennsylvania
- Coordinates: 39°58′54″N 75°53′29″W
- Country: United States
- State: Pennsylvania
- County: Chester
- Township: Sadsbury
- Elevation: 640 ft (200 m)
- Time zone: UTC-5 (Eastern (EST))
  - Summer (DST): UTC-4 (EDT)
- ZIP code: 19369
- Area codes: 610 and 484
- GNIS feature ID: 1185712

Sadsburyville is an unincorporated area in Sadsbury Township, Chester County, Pennsylvania, United States

== History and Geography ==
Sadsburyville is located at the intersection of U.S. Route 30 Business and Old Wilmington Road, approximately four miles west of Coatesville and about three miles northeast of Parkesburg.

== Education ==
The school district is Coatesville Area School District.

== Gallery ==
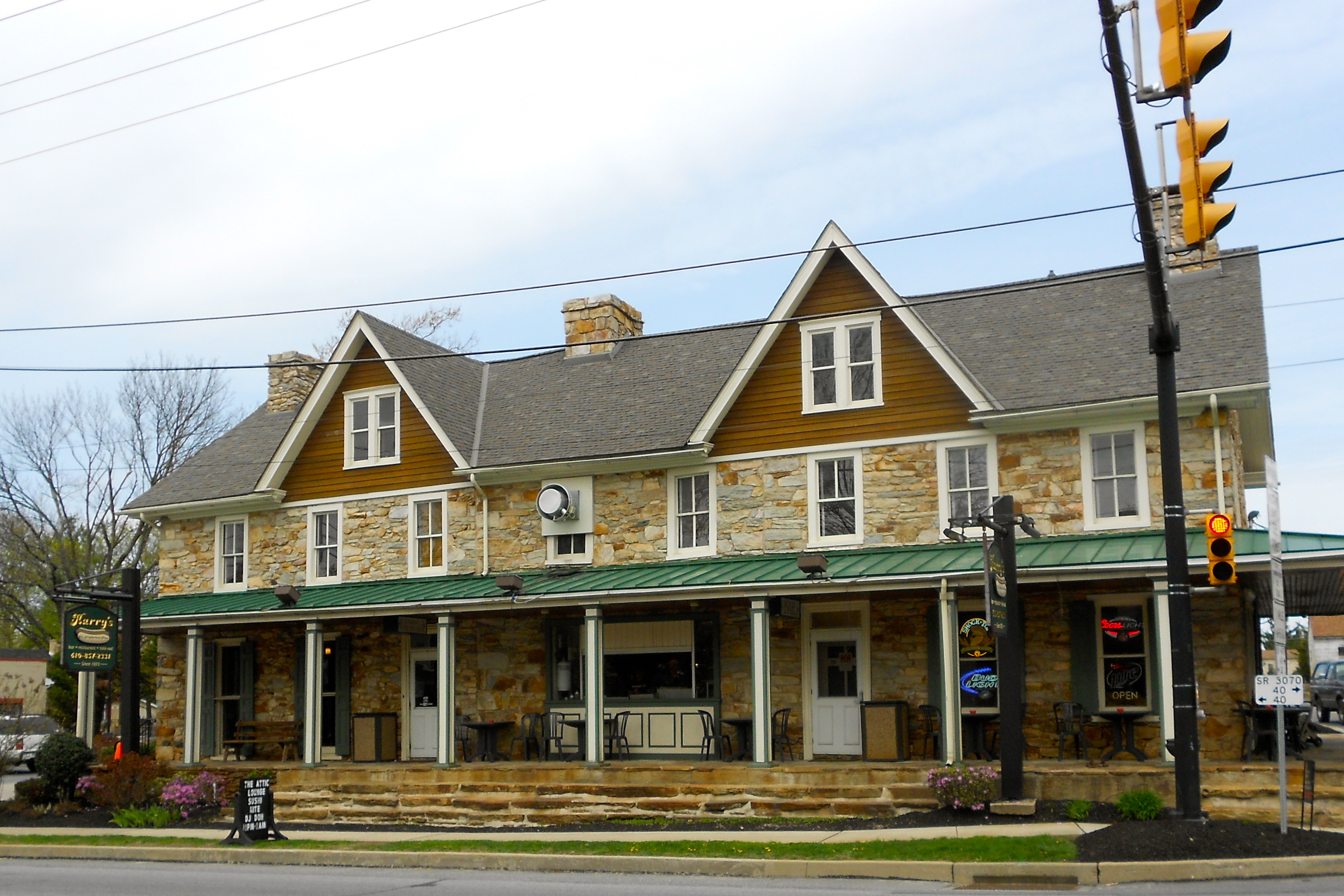
Harry's Hotdogs

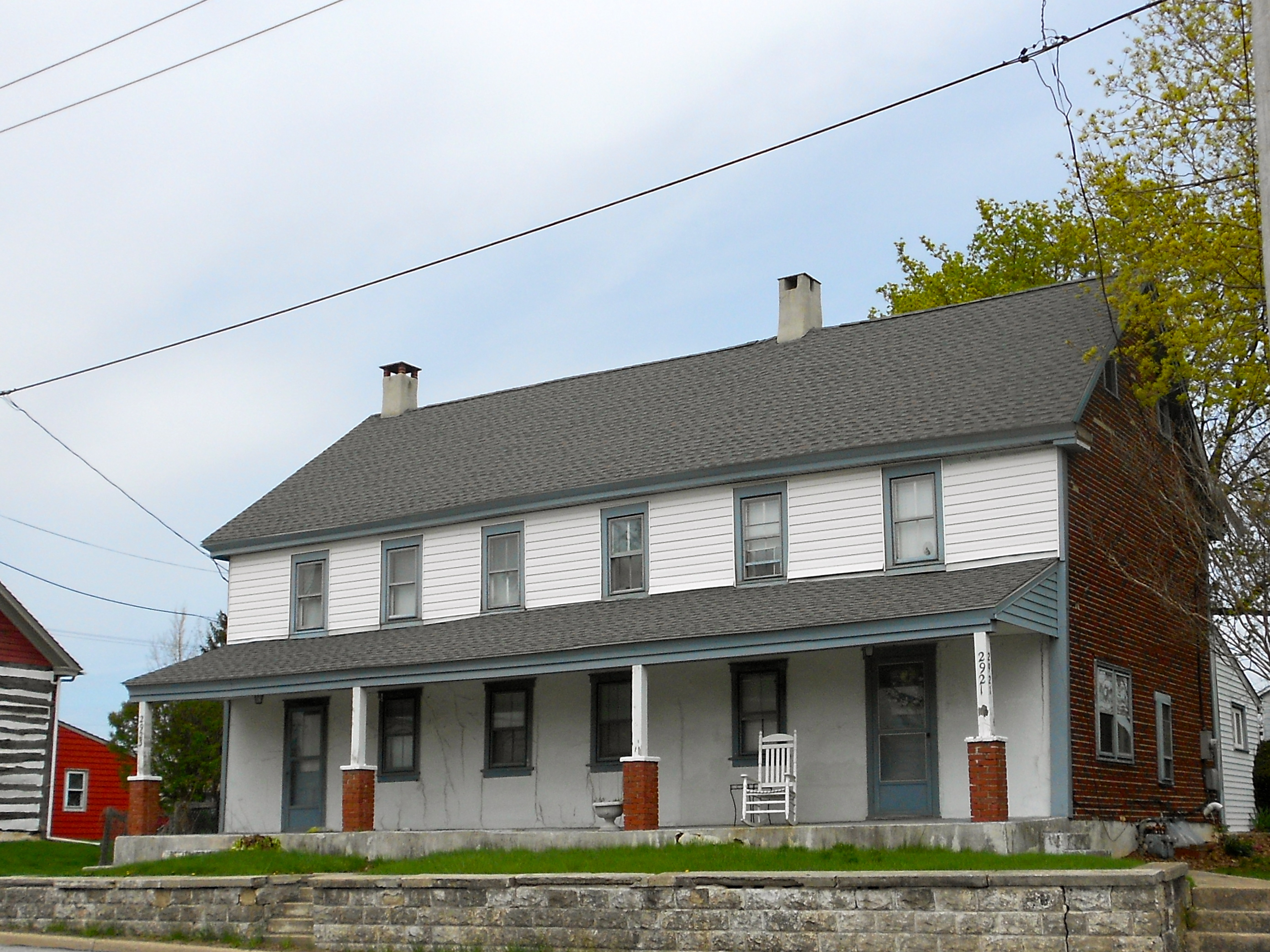
Private home
