= Pomeroy, Pennsylvania =

Unincorporated community in Pennsylvania, US

- Census-designated place
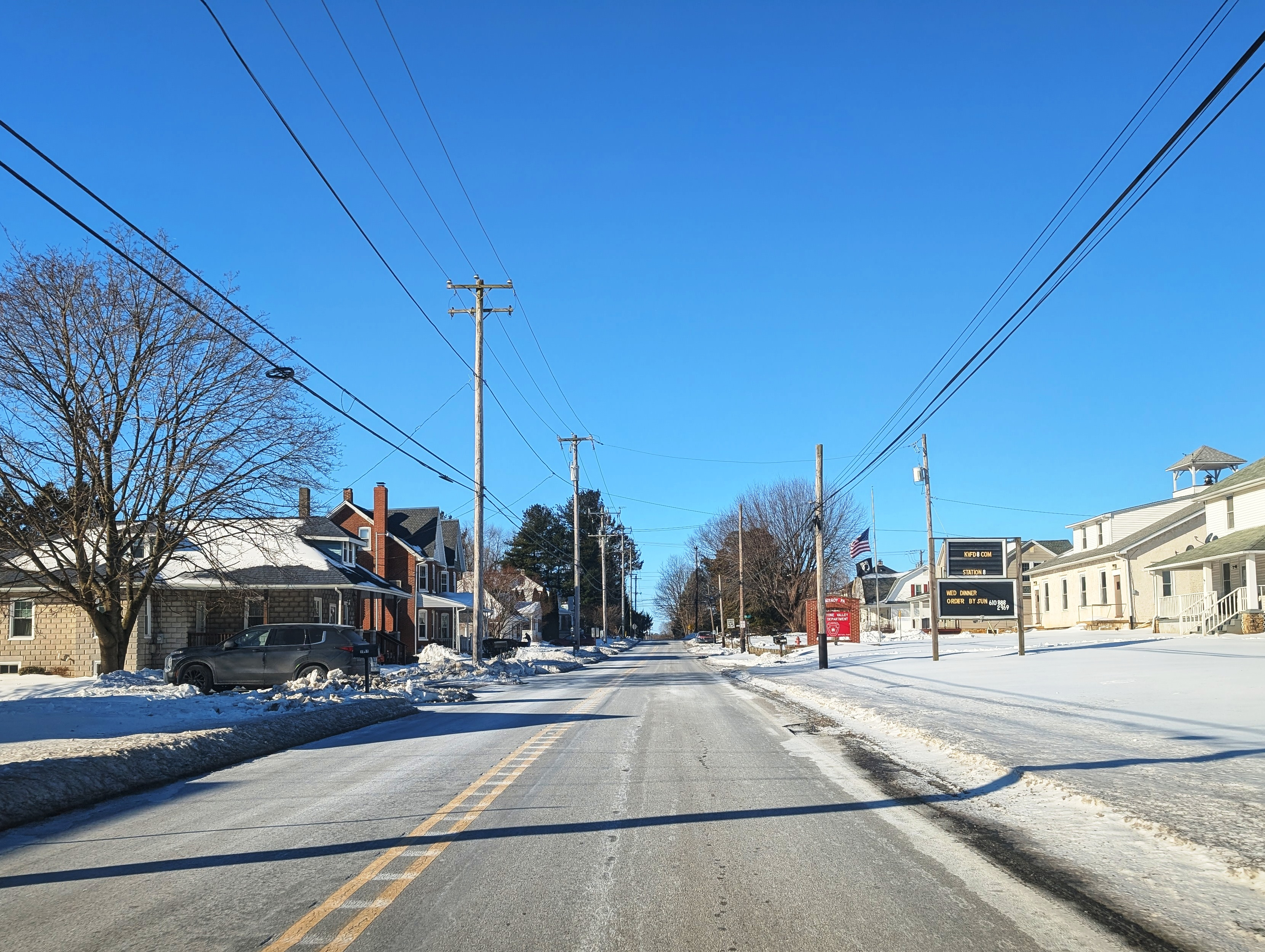
- PA 372 westbound through Pomeroy

- Location in Chester County and the state of Pennsylvania.
- Coordinates: 39°57′51″N 75°53′11″W
- Country: United States
- State: Pennsylvania
- County: Chester
- Township: Sadsbury

Area
  - Total: 0.47 sq mi (1.21 km^{2})
  - Land: 0.46 sq mi (1.20 km^{2})
  - Water: 0.0039 sq mi (0.01 km^{2})
- Elevation: 484 ft (148 m)

Population (2020)
  - Total: 1,085
  - Density: 2,335.6/sq mi (901.77/km^{2})
- Time zone: UTC-5 (Eastern (EST))
  - Summer (DST): UTC-4 (EDT)
- ZIP code: 19367
- Area codes: 610 and 484
- FIPS code: 42-61968

Pomeroy is a census-designated place (CDP) in Sadsbury Township, Chester County, Pennsylvania, United States. The population was 401 at the 2010 census.

It was once the northern terminus of the Pomeroy and Newark Railroad until passenger service was terminated in 1928.

== Geography ==
Pomeroy is located at 39°57′51″N 75°53′11″W in the southeast corner of Sadsbury Township. Pennsylvania Route 372 passes through the center of the village, connecting Coatesville 3 miles (5 km) to the east with Parkesburg 1 mile (1.6 km) to the west.

According to the United States Census Bureau, the CDP has a total area of 0.33 square miles (0.86 km^{2}), of which 0.33 square miles (0.85 km^{2}) is land and 0.004 square miles (0.01 km^{2}), or 0.88%, is water.

== Demographics ==
Historical population
Census	Pop.	Note	%±
2010	401		—
2020	1,085		170.6%
U.S. Decennial Census

== Education ==
The school district is Coatesville Area School District.
