= Parkesburg School =

- U.S. National Register of Historic Places
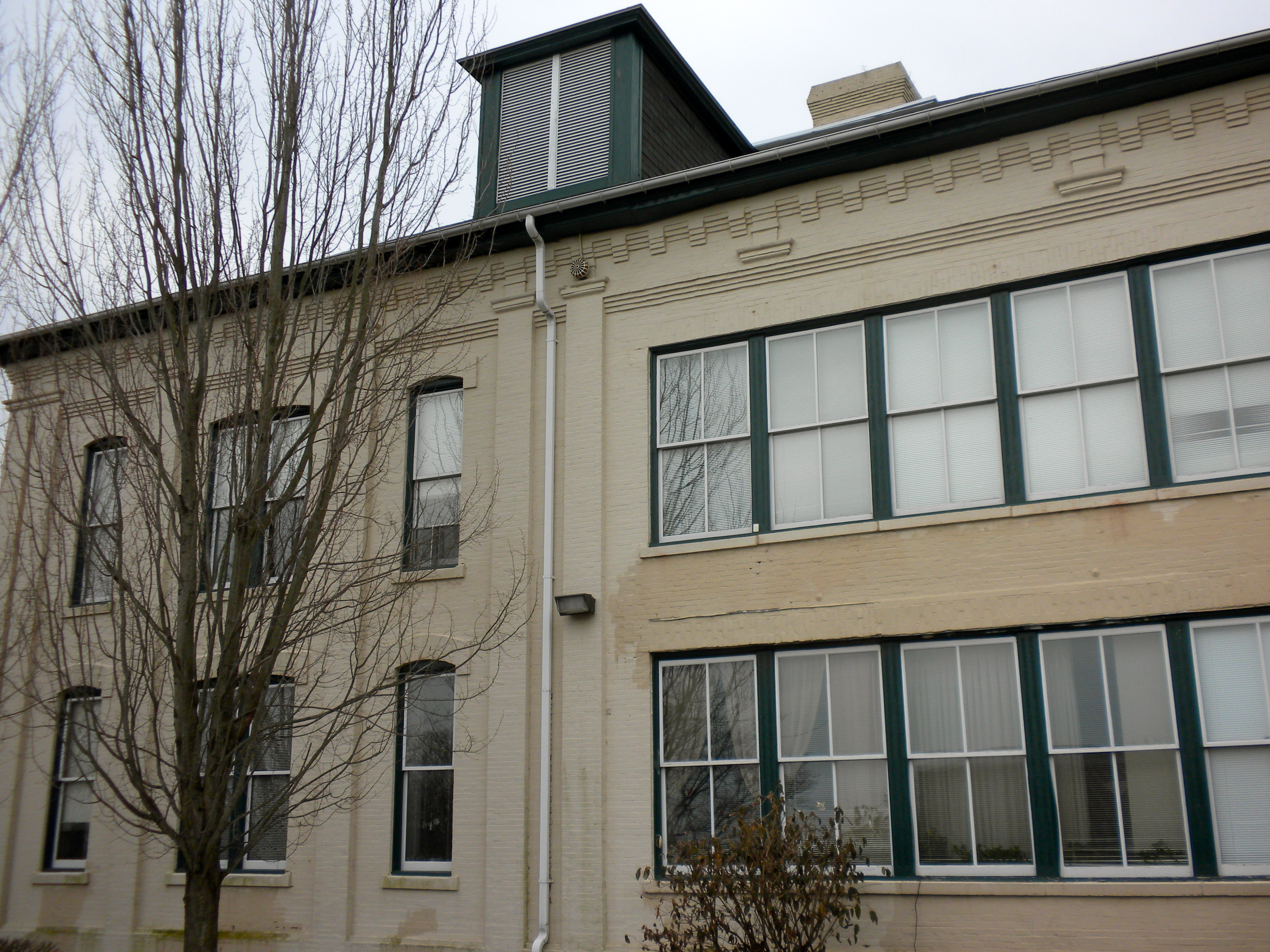
- Parkesburg School, March 2010

- Location within Pennsylvania Location within the United States
- Location: 360 Strasburg Ave., Parkesburg, Pennsylvania
- Coordinates: 39°57′41″N 75°55′13″W
- Area: 2.2 acres (0.89 ha)
- Built: 1899–1900, 1916, 1958–1959
- Architect: Adams, Clyde; et al.
- Architectural style: Renaissance, Colonial Revival
- NRHP reference No.: 95000524
- Added to NRHP: April 27, 1995

The Parkesburg School is an historic school building in Parkesburg, Chester County, Pennsylvania, United States.

It was added to the National Register of Historic Places in 1995.

== History and architectural features ==
This historic structure was built in three sections. The oldest, which dates to between 1899 and 1900, with additions made in 1916 and circa 1958 to 1959, is a two-story, rectangular, brick building that was designed in the Italian Renaissance Revival style. It is nine bays by four bays and has a dual pitched hipped roof. The 1916 addition is two stories and was designed in the Colonial Revival style. The 1958–1959 addition is a one-story, rectangular brick structure that is attached to the main building by a narrow ell-shaped connector wing. It has been converted into a retirement home.
