= Sadsbury Township, Chester County, Pennsylvania =

Township in Pennsylvania, US

Sadsbury Township
- Township
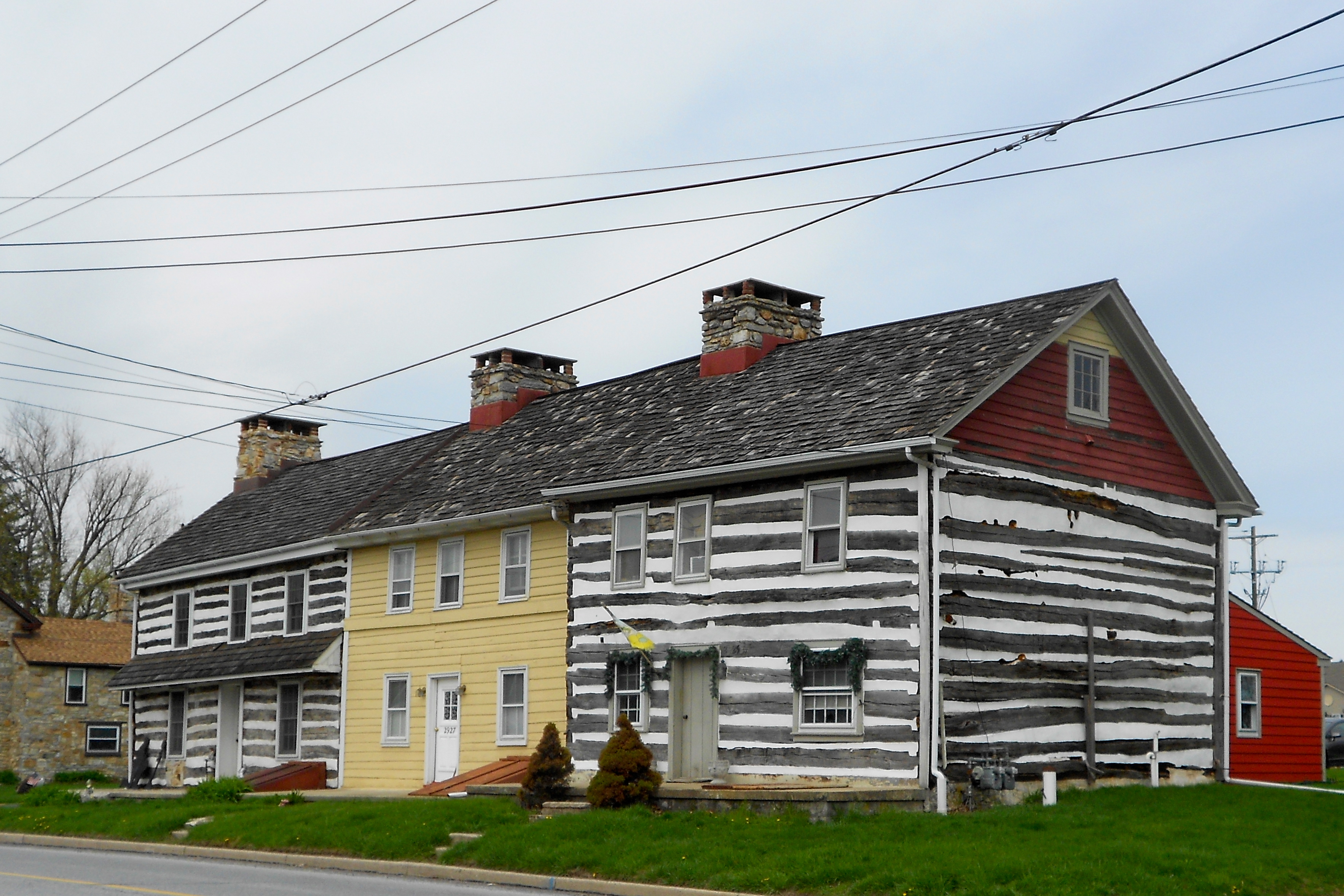
- Houses along US 30 Business

- Location in Chester County and the state of Pennsylvania.

- Location of Pennsylvania in the United States
- Coordinates: 39°58′40″N 75°53′57″W
- Country: United States
- State: Pennsylvania
- County: Chester

Area
  - Total: 6.20 sq mi (16.05 km^{2})
  - Land: 6.17 sq mi (15.97 km^{2})
  - Water: 0.031 sq mi (0.08 km^{2})
- Elevation: 581 ft (177 m)

Population (2020)
  - Total: 4,125
  - Density: 629.2/sq mi (242.92/km^{2})
- Time zone: UTC-5 (EST)
  - Summer (DST): UTC-4 (EDT)
- Area code: 610
- FIPS code: 42-029-67080
- Website: http://www.sadsburytwp.org

Sadsbury Township is a township in Chester County, Pennsylvania, United States. The population was 4,125 at the 2020 census.

== Geography ==
According to the United States Census Bureau, the township has a total land area of 6.17 square miles (16.0 km^{2}) with a total water area of 0.03 square miles (0.078 km^{2}). It includes the village of Sadsburyville in the north, and the census-designated place of Pomeroy in the south.

== History ==
The township of Sadsbury was organized in 1717. In 1728, it was divided into West Sadsbury Township and East Sadsbury Township. East Sadsbury Township was reduced in size by the creation of Valley Township in 1852, the borough of Parkesburg in 1872 and the borough of Atglen in 1875. The final division came with the inception of West Sadsbury in 1878, with the remainder being Sadsbury Township in its current form.

== Demographics ==
Historical population
Census	Pop.	Note	%±
1930	1,071		—
1940	1,226		14.5%
1950	1,502		22.5%
1960	2,066		37.5%
1970	2,103		1.8%
1980	2,398		14.0%
1990	2,510		4.7%
2000	2,582		2.9%
2010	3,570		38.3%
2020	4,125		15.5%

As of the census of 2010, there were 3,570 people, 1,311 households, and 988 families living in the township. There were 1,361 housing units, of which 1,311 were occupied. The racial makeup of the township was 84.5% White, 8.5% African American, 2.6% Asian, 0.3% Native American, 0.1% Pacific Islander, 1.2% from other races, and 2.9% from two or more races. Hispanic or Latino of any race were 4.1% of the population.

There were 1,311 households, out of which 32.4% had children under the age of 18 living with them, 60.7% were married couples living together, 10% had a female householder with no husband present, 4.7% had a male householder with no wife present, and 24.6% were non-families. 18.9% of all households were made up of individuals, and 20% had someone living alone who was 65 years of age or older. The average household size was 2.72 and the average family size was 3.1.

In the township the population had 2.9% under the age of 15, 10.7% from 15 to 24, 29.4% from 25 to 44, 29.2% from 45 to 64, and 9.7% who were 65 years of age or older. The median age was 37.4 years. 50.7% of the population were males, 49.3% were females.

The median income for a household in the township was $77,551, and the median income for a family was $78,803. Males had a median income of $50,806 versus $43,142 for females. The per capita income for the township was $31,603. 2.1% of families and 2.8% of the population were below the poverty line, including 4.5% of those under age 18 and 2.6% of those aged between 18 and 64 and nobody aged 65 and over.

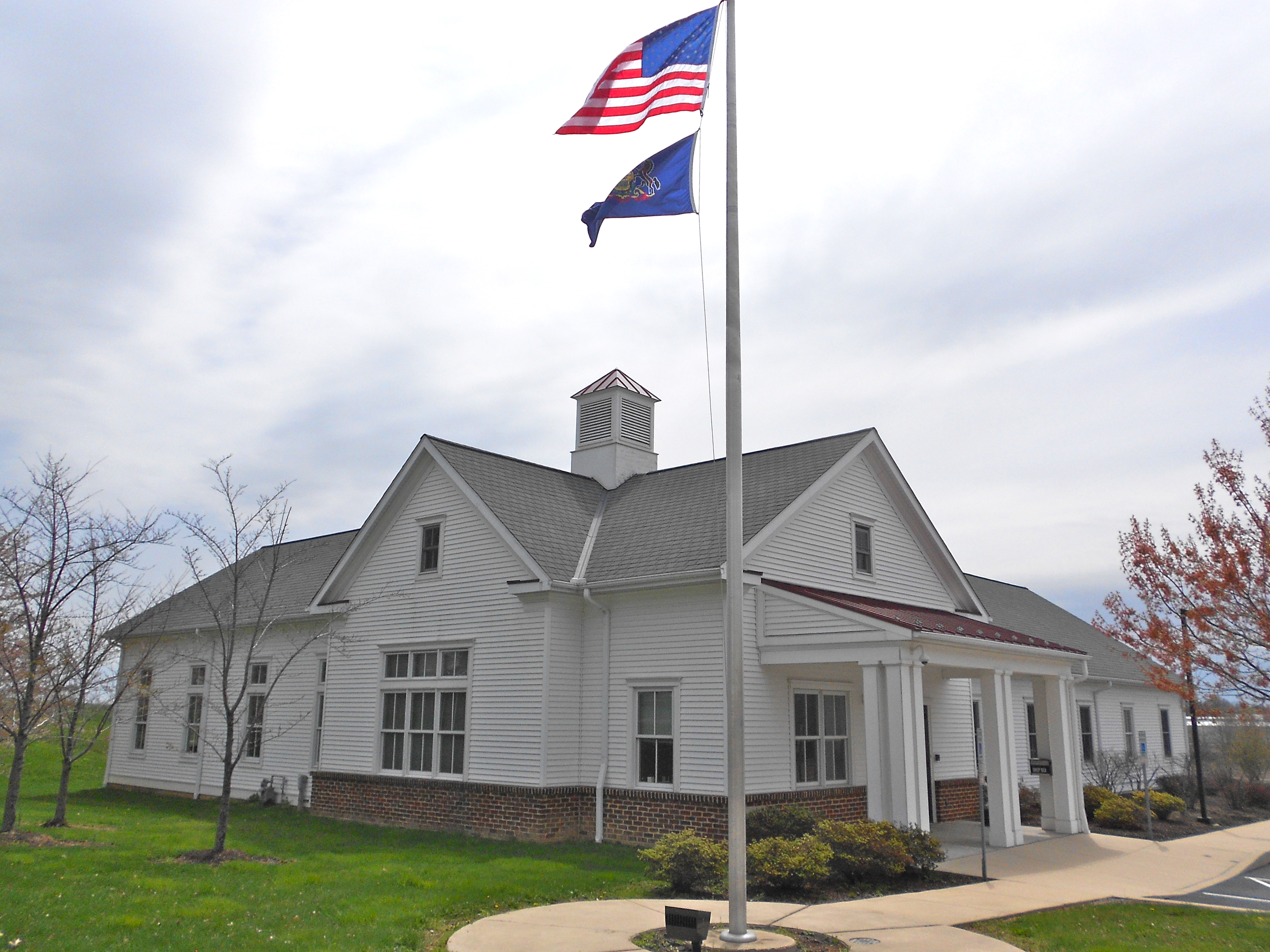
Township office

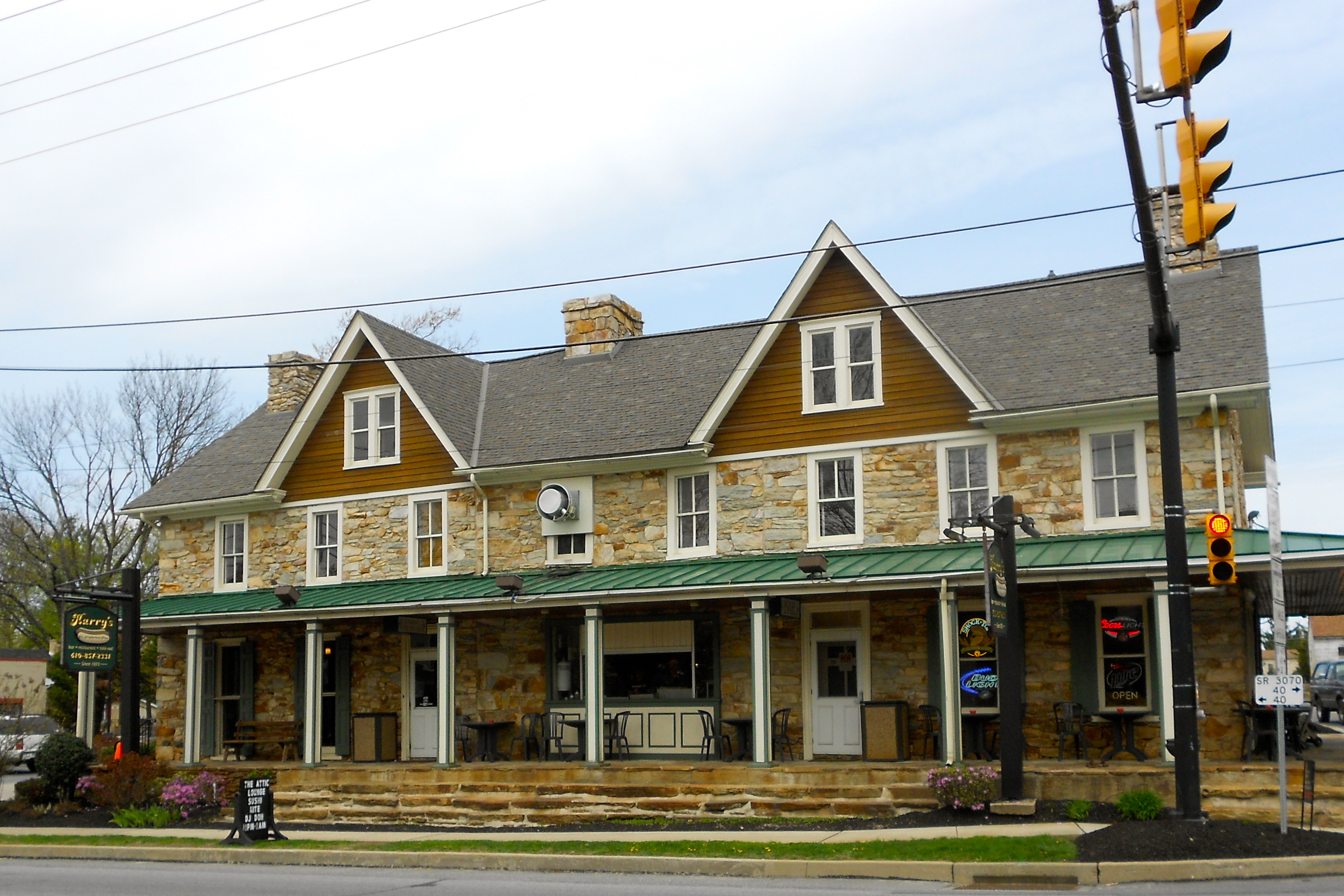
Business in Sadsburyville

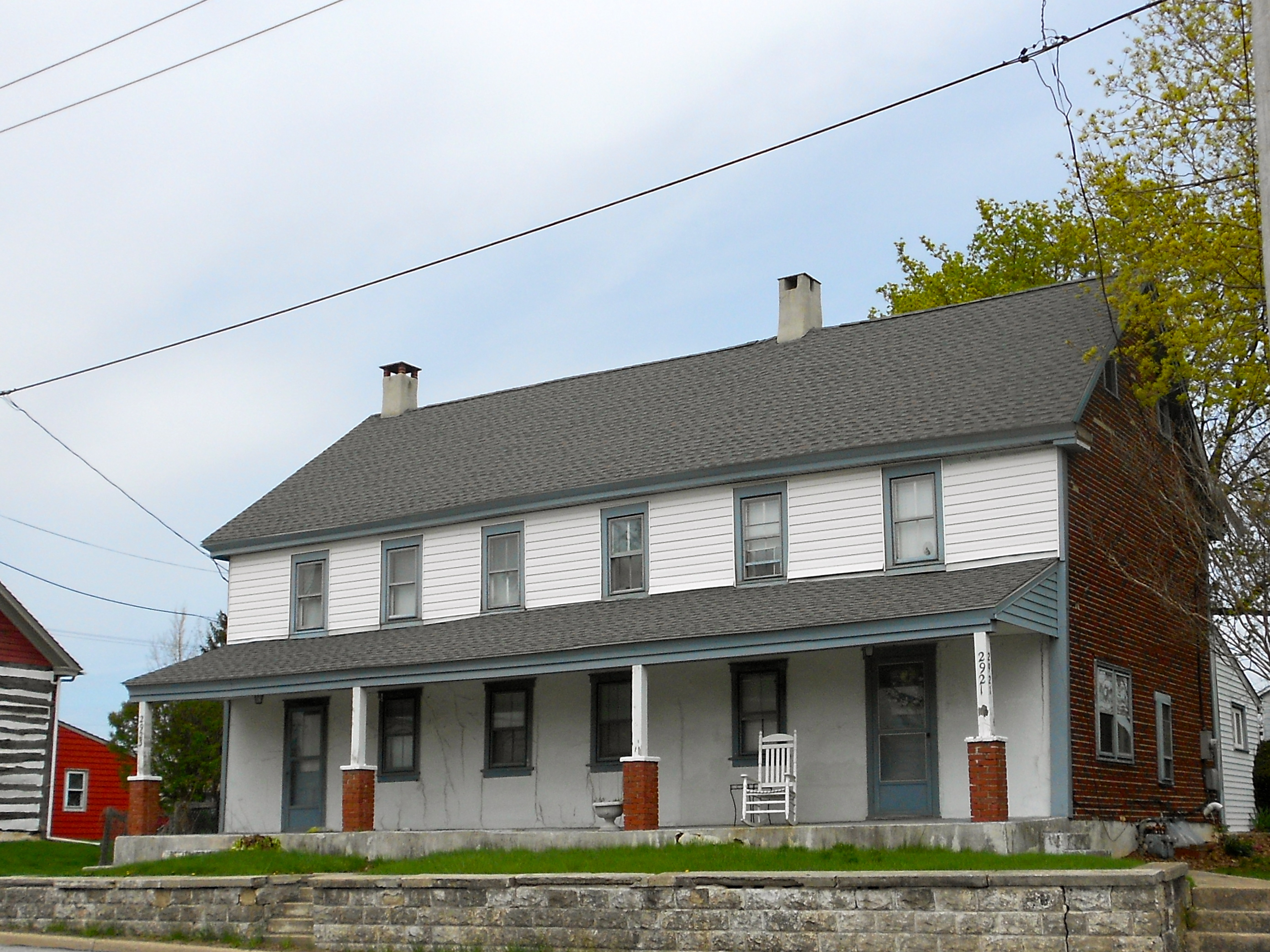
House in Sadsburyville

== Transportation ==
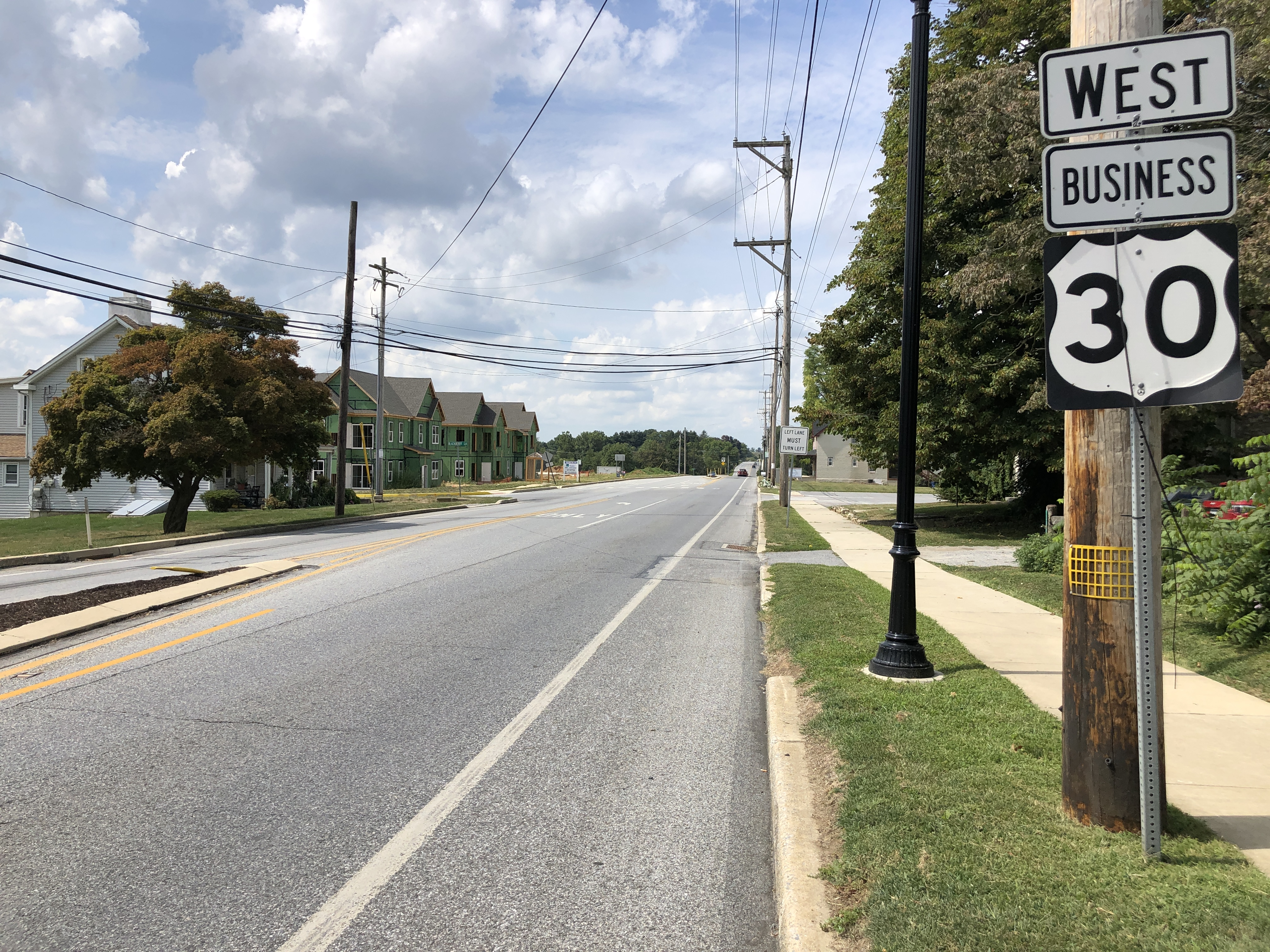
US 30 Business westbound in Sadsbury Township

As of 2018, there were 33.02 miles (53.14 km) of public roads in Sadsbury Township, of which 11.95 miles (19.23 km) were maintained by the Pennsylvania Department of Transportation (PennDOT) and 21.07 miles (33.91 km) were maintained by the township.

U.S. Route 30 is the most prominent highway serving Sadsbury Township. It follows Lincoln Highway and the Coatesville-Downingtown Bypass along a west-east alignment through the north-central portion of the township. U.S. Route 30 Business begins at the western end of the Coatesville-Downingtown Bypass and continues eastward along Lincoln Highway. Pennsylvania Route 10 follows Octorara Trail on a north-south alignment along the western edge of the township. Finally, Pennsylvania Route 372 follows Valley Road along an east-west alignment through the southeastern portion of the township.
