= Parkesburg, Pennsylvania =

Borough in Pennsylvania, US

- Borough
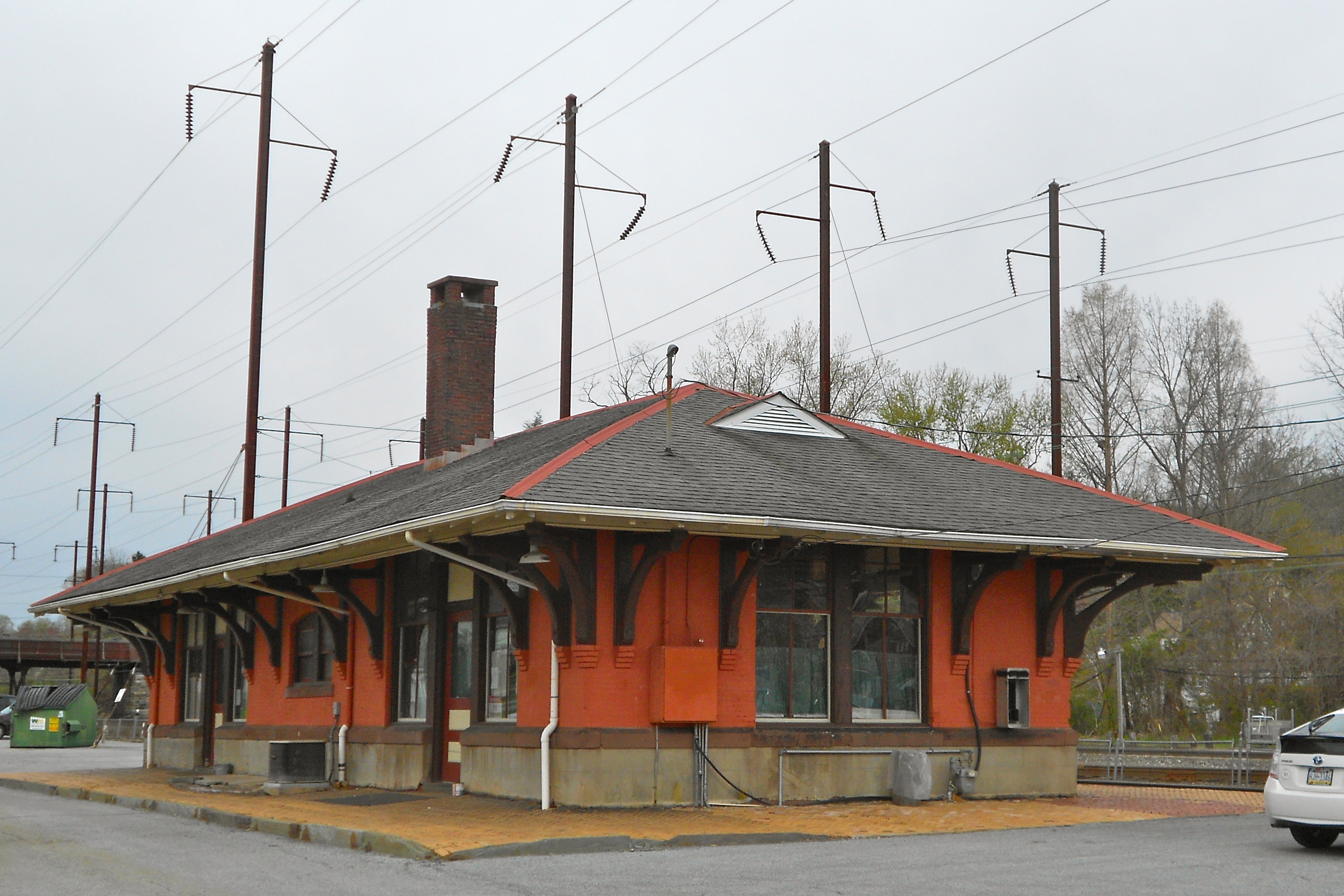
- Amtrak station

- Location in Chester County and the U.S. state of Pennsylvania

- Location in Pennsylvania Location in the United States
- Coordinates: 39°57′33″N 75°55′14″W
- Country: United States
- State: Pennsylvania
- County: Chester
- Established: 1872

Government
  - Mayor: John P. Hagan, II

Area
  - Total: 1.27 sq mi (3.30 km^{2})
  - Land: 1.27 sq mi (3.29 km^{2})
  - Water: 0.0039 sq mi (0.01 km^{2})
- Elevation: 528 ft (161 m)

Population (2020)
  - Total: 3,984
  - Density: 3,042.7/sq mi (1,174.78/km^{2})
- Time zone: UTC-5 (EST)
  - Summer (DST): UTC-4 (EDT)
- ZIP Code: 19365
- Area code: 610
- FIPS code: 42-58032
- Website: www.parkesburg.org

Parkesburg is a borough in Chester County, Pennsylvania, United States. The population was counted as 3,984 at the 2020 census. The ZIP code is 19365.

== History ==
Parkesburg was first known as the Fountain Inn, a tavern built ca. 1734. The inn ceased operation as a tavern around 1836 and became Parkesburg's first post office. In 1872, the Pennsylvania legislature authorized the formation of Parkesburg Borough (from Sadsbury Township). The town was named after noted politician John G. Parke. Today, the Fountain Inn is a private residence.

The Parkesburg National Bank and Parkesburg School are listed on the National Register of Historic Places.

== Geography ==
Parkesburg is located at 39°57′33″N 75°55′14″W (39.959066, -75.920447).

According to the United States Census Bureau, the borough has a total area of 1.2 square miles (3.1 km^{2}), all land.

== Demographics ==
Historical population
Census	Pop.	Note	%±
1870	1,151		—
1880	1,502		30.5%
1890	1,514		0.8%
1900	1,788		18.1%
1910	2,522		41.1%
1920	2,543		0.8%
1930	2,288		−10.0%
1940	2,288		0.0%
1950	2,611		14.1%
1960	2,759		5.7%
1970	2,701		−2.1%
1980	2,578		−4.6%
1990	2,981		15.6%
2000	3,373		13.1%
2010	3,593		6.5%
2020	3,862		7.5%
2024 (est.)	3,984	▲	3.2%

=== 2020 census ===
As of the 2020 census, Parkesburg had a population of 3,862. The median age was 37.5 years. 25.0% of residents were under the age of 18 and 14.6% of residents were 65 years of age or older. For every 100 females there were 89.5 males, and for every 100 females age 18 and over there were 89.2 males age 18 and over.

98.9% of residents lived in urban areas, while 1.1% lived in rural areas.

There were 1,471 households in Parkesburg, of which 37.2% had children under the age of 18 living in them. Of all households, 44.4% were married-couple households, 18.3% were households with a male householder and no spouse or partner present, and 29.6% were households with a female householder and no spouse or partner present. About 28.9% of all households were made up of individuals and 14.8% had someone living alone who was 65 years of age or older.

There were 1,550 housing units, of which 5.1% were vacant. The homeowner vacancy rate was 0.8% and the rental vacancy rate was 5.6%.

Racial composition as of the 2020 census
Race	Number	Percent
White	2,870	74.3%
Black or African American	426	11.0%
American Indian and Alaska Native	33	0.9%
Asian	26	0.7%
Native Hawaiian and Other Pacific Islander	1	0.0%
Some other race	171	4.4%
Two or more races	335	8.7%
Hispanic or Latino (of any race)	392	10.2%

=== 2010 census ===
At the 2010 census, the borough was 81.1% non-Hispanic White, 9.0% Black or African American, 0.9% Native American, 0.3% Asian, 0.1% Native Hawaiian or other Pacific Islander, and 2.1% were two or more races. 7.5% of the population were of Hispanic or Latino ancestry .

=== 2000 census ===
As of the census of 2000, there were 3,373 people, 1,243 households, and 870 families residing in the borough. The population density was 2,706.8 inhabitants per square mile (1,045.1/km^{2}). There were 1,321 housing units at an average density of 1,060.1 per square mile (409.3/km^{2}). The racial makeup of the borough was 90.93% White, 6.88% African American, 0.15% Native American, 0.15% Asian, 0.03% Pacific Islander, 1.13% from other races, and 0.74% from two or more races. Hispanic or Latino of any race were 3.77% of the population.

There were 1,243 households, out of which 38.5% had children under the age of 18 living with them, 54.9% were married couples living together, 10.5% had a female householder with no husband present, and 30.0% were non-families. 26.4% of all households were made up of individuals, and 13.9% had someone living alone who was 65 years of age or older. The average household size was 2.70 and the average family size was 3.29.

In the borough the population was spread out, with 29.7% under the age of 18, 7.7% from 18 to 24, 31.8% from 25 to 44, 17.5% from 45 to 64, and 13.4% who were 65 years of age or older. The median age was 35 years. For every 100 females there were 93.0 males. For every 100 females age 18 and over, there were 87.9 males.

The median income for a household in the borough was $44,934, and the median income for a family was $55,726. Males had a median income of $38,482 versus $28,262 for females. The per capita income for the borough was $19,080. About 4.6% of families and 7.5% of the population were below the poverty line, including 11.0% of those under age 18 and 8.6% of those age 65 or over.

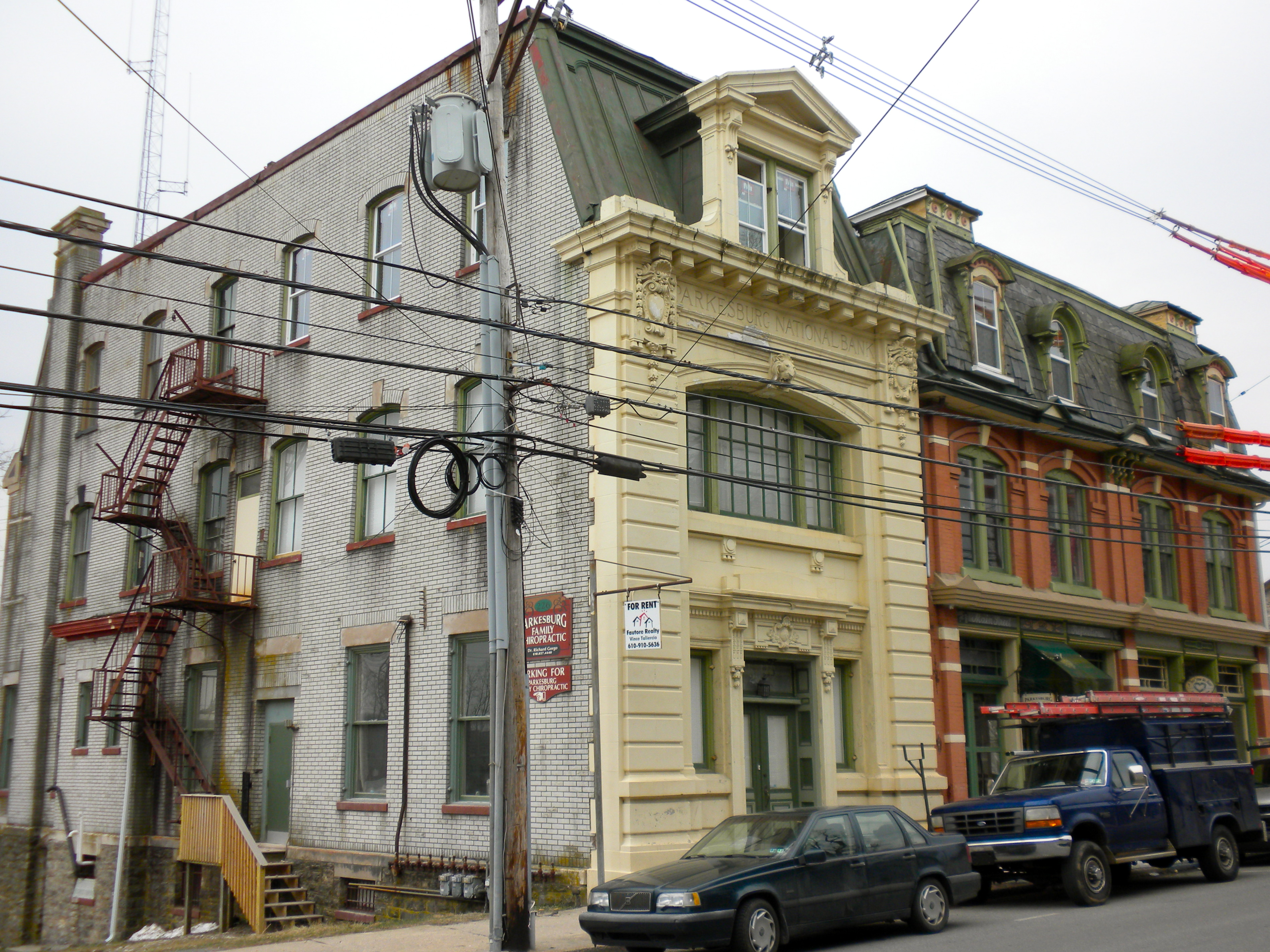
Parkesburg National Bank building

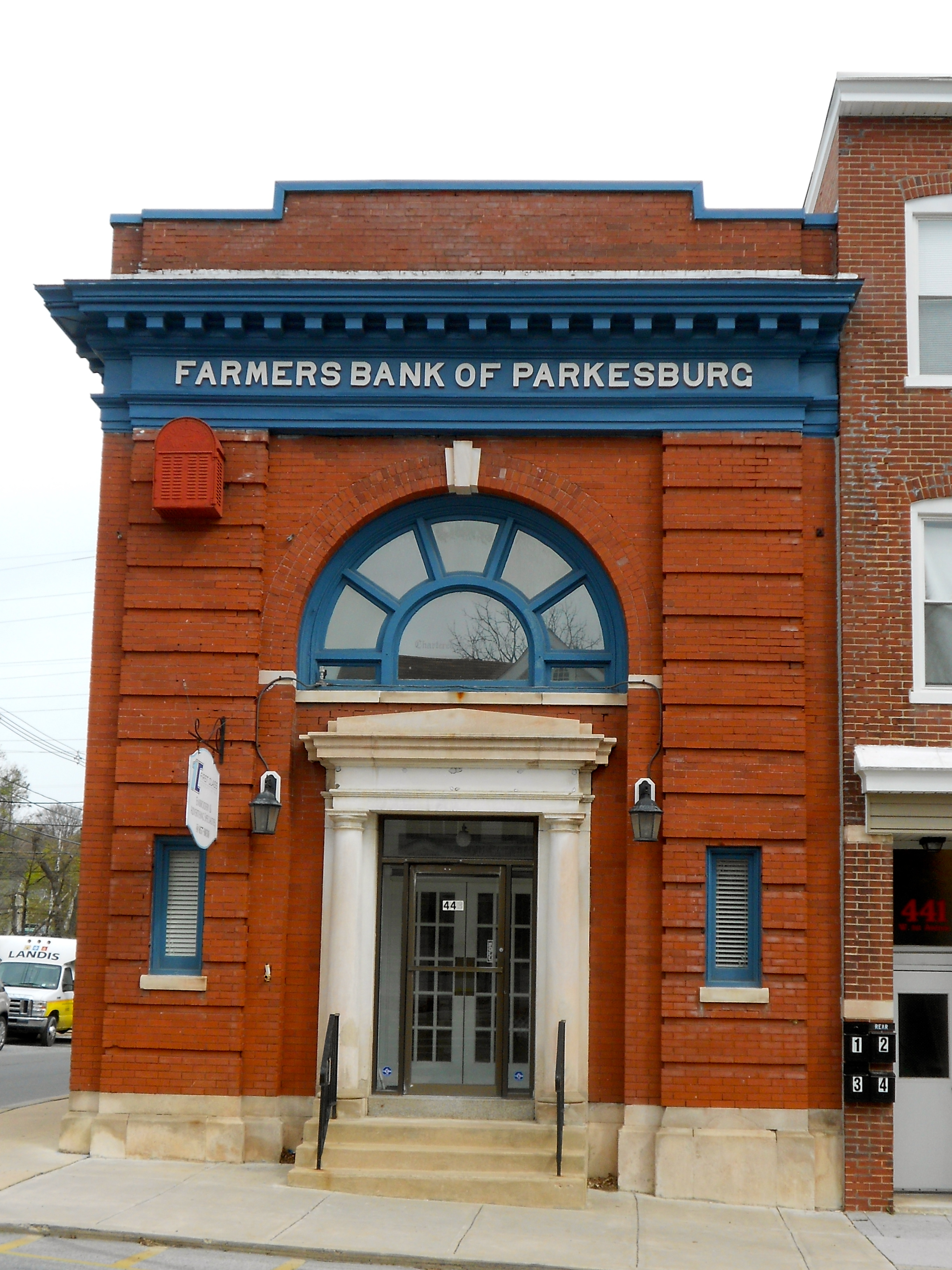
Farmers Bank of Parkesburg

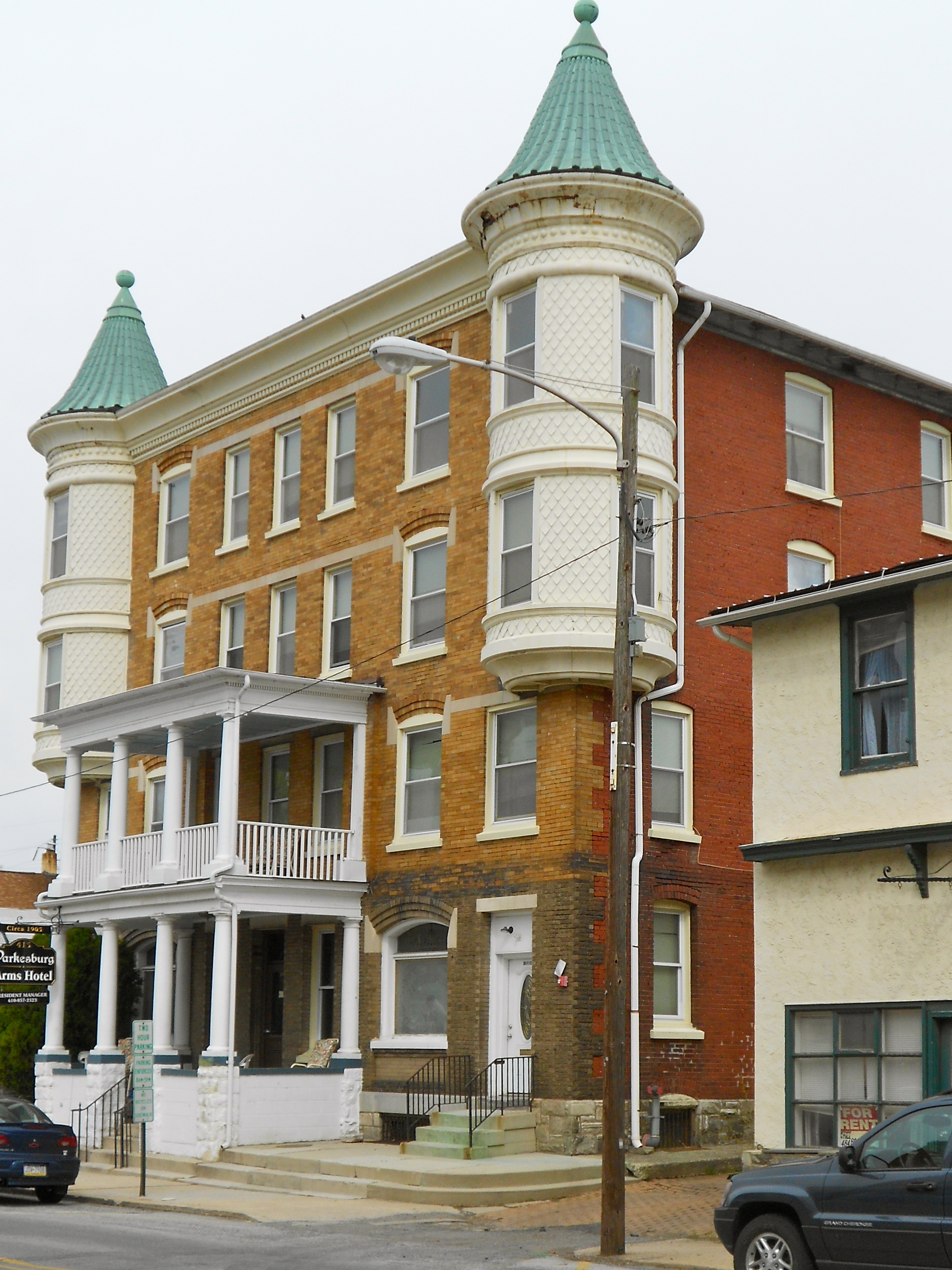
Parkesburg Arms Hotel

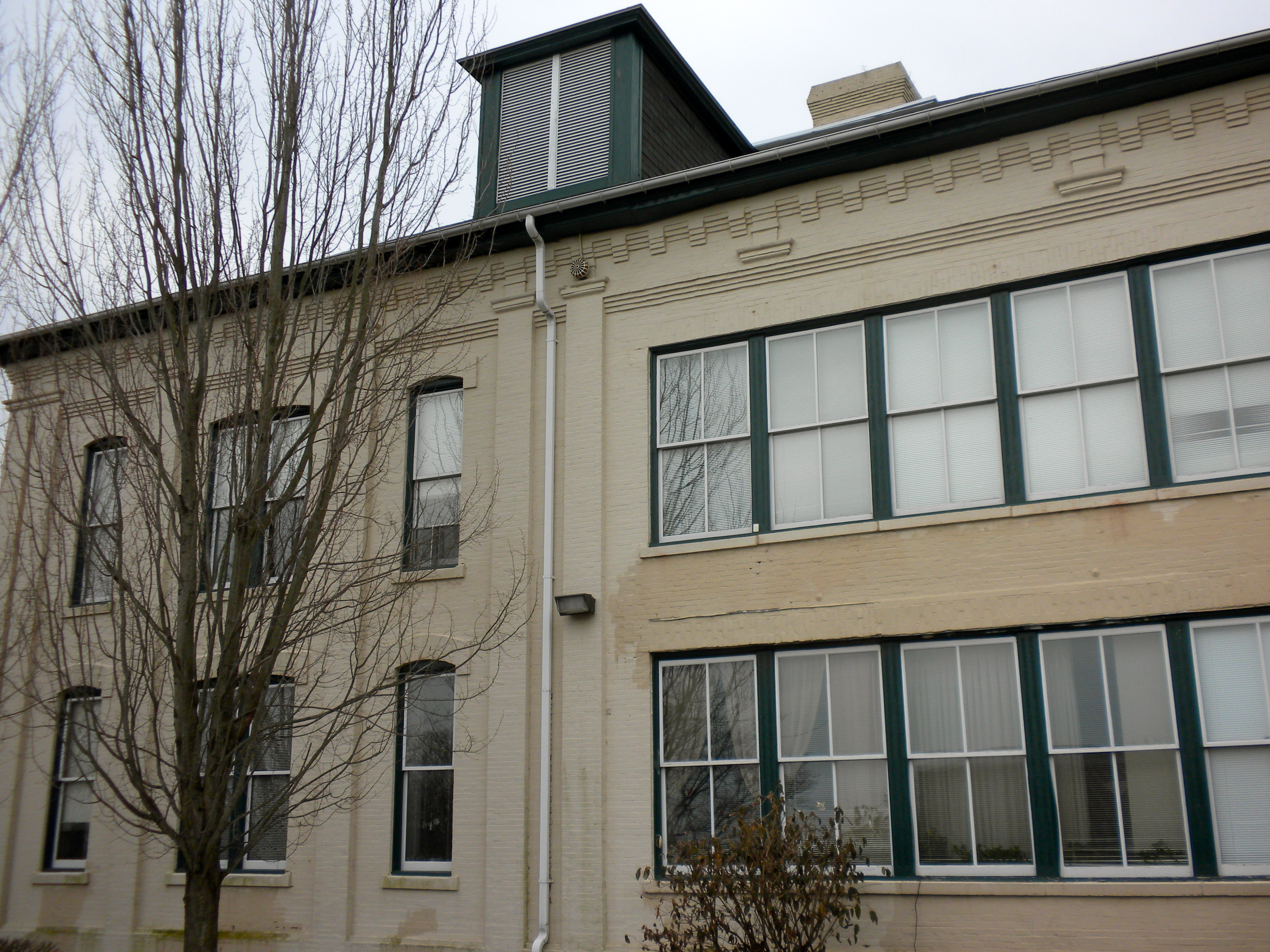
Parkesburg school

== Transportation ==
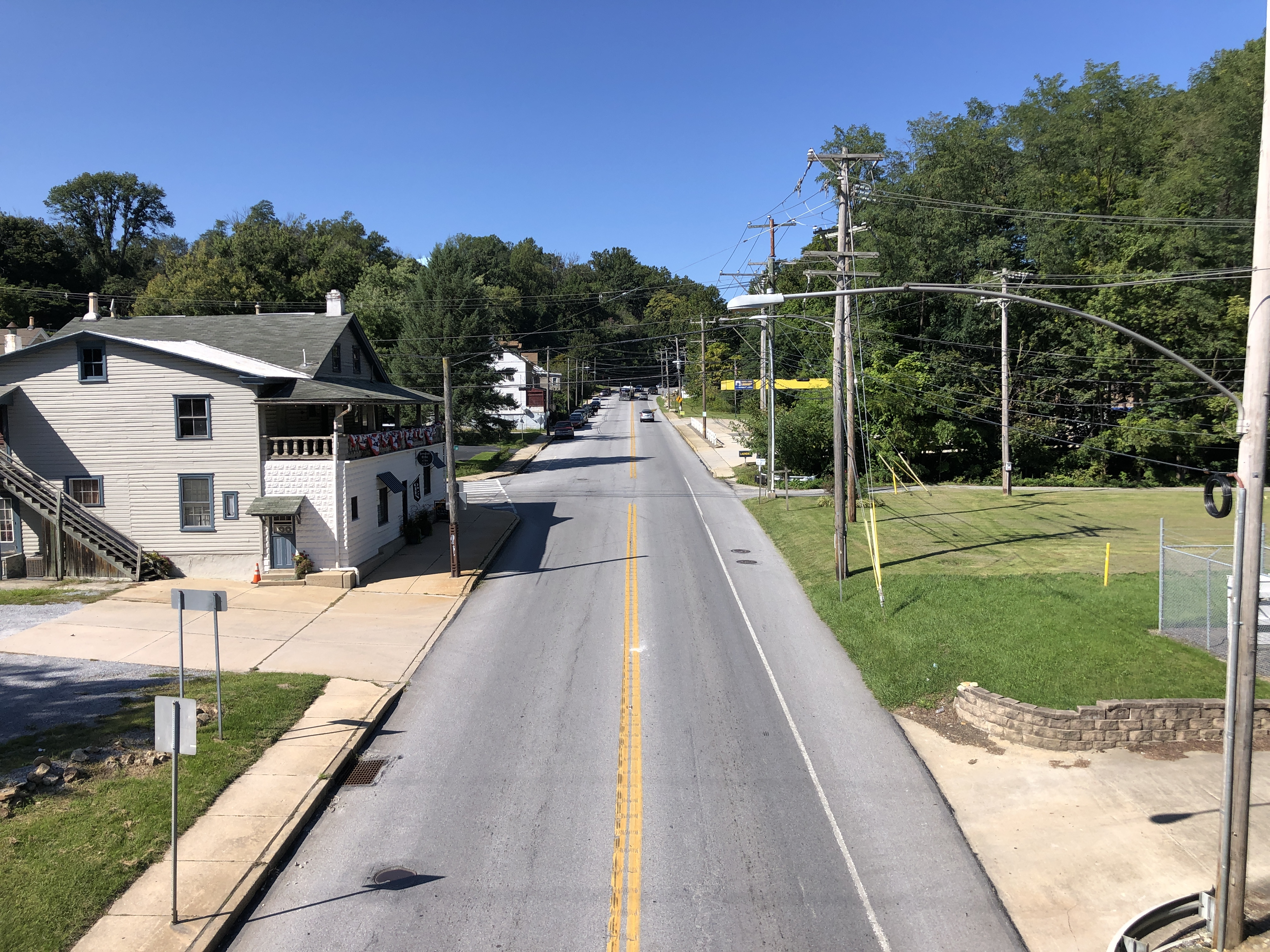
PA 10 northbound in Parkesburg

As of 2022, there were 15.16 miles (24.40 km) of public roads in Parkesburg, of which 3.35 miles (5.39 km) were maintained by Pennsylvania Department of Transportation (PennDOT) and 11.81 miles (19.01 km) were maintained by the borough.

Parkesburg is served by two numbered highways. Pennsylvania Route 10 follows Church Street along a northwest-to-southeast alignment in the eastern part of the borough, while Pennsylvania Route 372 follows Limestone Road and First Avenue along a southwest-to-northeast alignment through the center of town.

Parkesburg is served by the Amtrak Keystone Service regional rail. Parkesburg station is located at 501 Maple Street in Parkesburg.

== Education ==
The school district is Octorara Area School District.

== Notable people ==
- Jesse Matlack Baker - Pennsylvania state senator
- Howard Queen - US Army colonel during World War I

== See also ==
- Parkesburg Amtrak station
