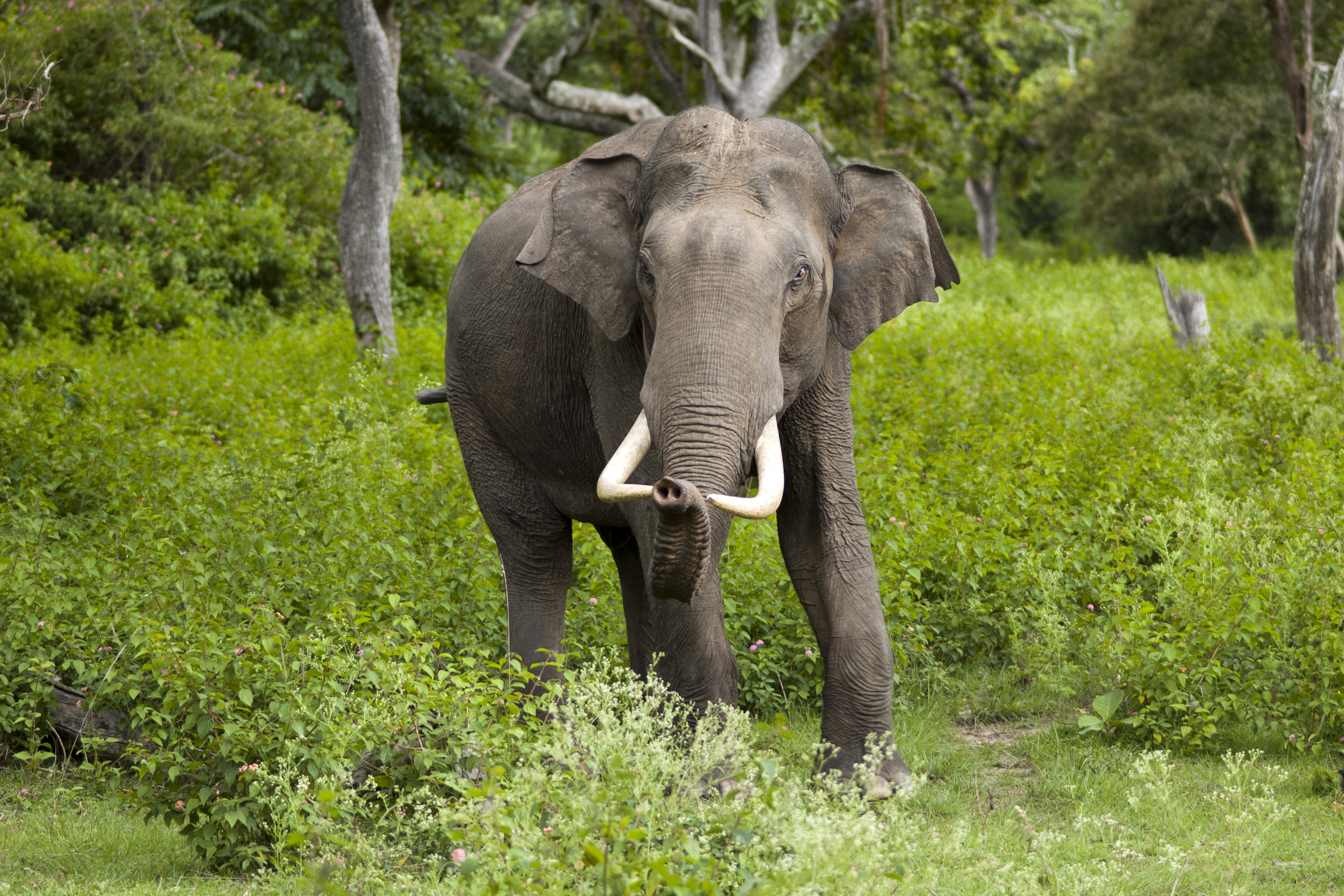
- A male elephant in Bandipur National Park
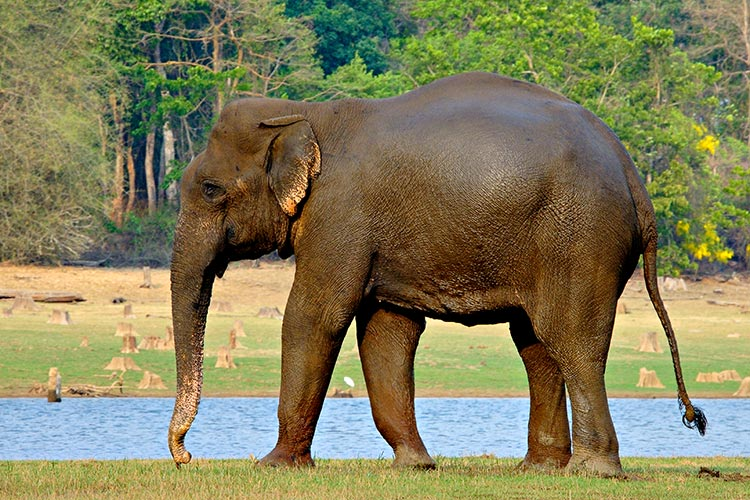
- A female elephant in Nagarahole National Park

Scientific classification
- Kingdom: Animalia
- Phylum: Chordata
- Class: Mammalia
- Order: Proboscidea
- Family: Elephantidae
- Genus: Elephas
- Species: E. maximus
- Subspecies: E. m. indicus

Trinomial name
- Elephas maximus indicus Cuvier, 1798

Synonyms
- E. m. bengalensis de Blainville, 1843

= Indian elephant =

Indian elephant Temporal range: Pleistocene – Recent

Most widespread subspecies of Asian elephant

The Indian elephant (Elephas maximus indicus) is one of three extant recognized subspecies of the Asian elephant, native to mainland Asia. It has a convex back and the highest body point on its head, exhibits significant sexual dimorphism with a male reaching an average shoulder height of about 2.75 m (9 ft 0 in) and weighing 4,000 kg (8,800 lb). A female reaches an average shoulder height of about 2.4 m (7 ft 10 in) and weighs 2,700 kg (6,000 lb). It has a broader skull with a concave forehead, two large laterally folded ears and a large trunk. It has smooth grey skin with four large legs and a long tail.

The Indian elephant is native to mainland Asia with nearly three-fourth of the population in India. It also occurs in Nepal, Bangladesh, Bhutan and Southeast Asian countries including Myanmar, Thailand, Malaysia, Laos, Cambodia, and Vietnam with a small population in China. It inhabits grasslands, dry deciduous, moist deciduous, evergreen and semi-evergreen forests across the range. It is classified as a megaherbivore and consumes up to 150 kg (330 lb) of plant matter per day. Its diet depends on the habitat and seasons and includes leaves and twigs of fresh foliage, thorn-bearing shoots, flowering plants, fruits and grass.

Since 1986, the Asian elephant has been listed as Endangered on the IUCN Red List as the wild population has declined by at least 50% over the last three elephant generations. It is threatened by environmental degradation, habitat loss and fragmentation. Poaching for ivory is a serious threat in some parts of Asia. Project Elephant was launched in 1992 by the Government of India to protect elephant habitats and population.

The Indian elephant is a cultural symbol throughout its range and appears in various religious traditions and mythologies. It is treated positively and is revered as a form of Ganesha in Hinduism. It has been designated the national heritage animal in India and is the national animal of Thailand and Laos.

== Taxonomy ==
The Indian elephant (Elephas maximus indicus) is one of three extant recognized subspecies of the Asian elephant. Carl Linnaeus proposed the scientific name Elephas maximus in 1758 for an elephant from Ceylon. Elephas indicus was proposed by Georges Cuvier in 1798, who described an elephant from India. Frederick Nutter Chasen classified all three as subspecies of the Asian elephant in 1940.

== Description ==
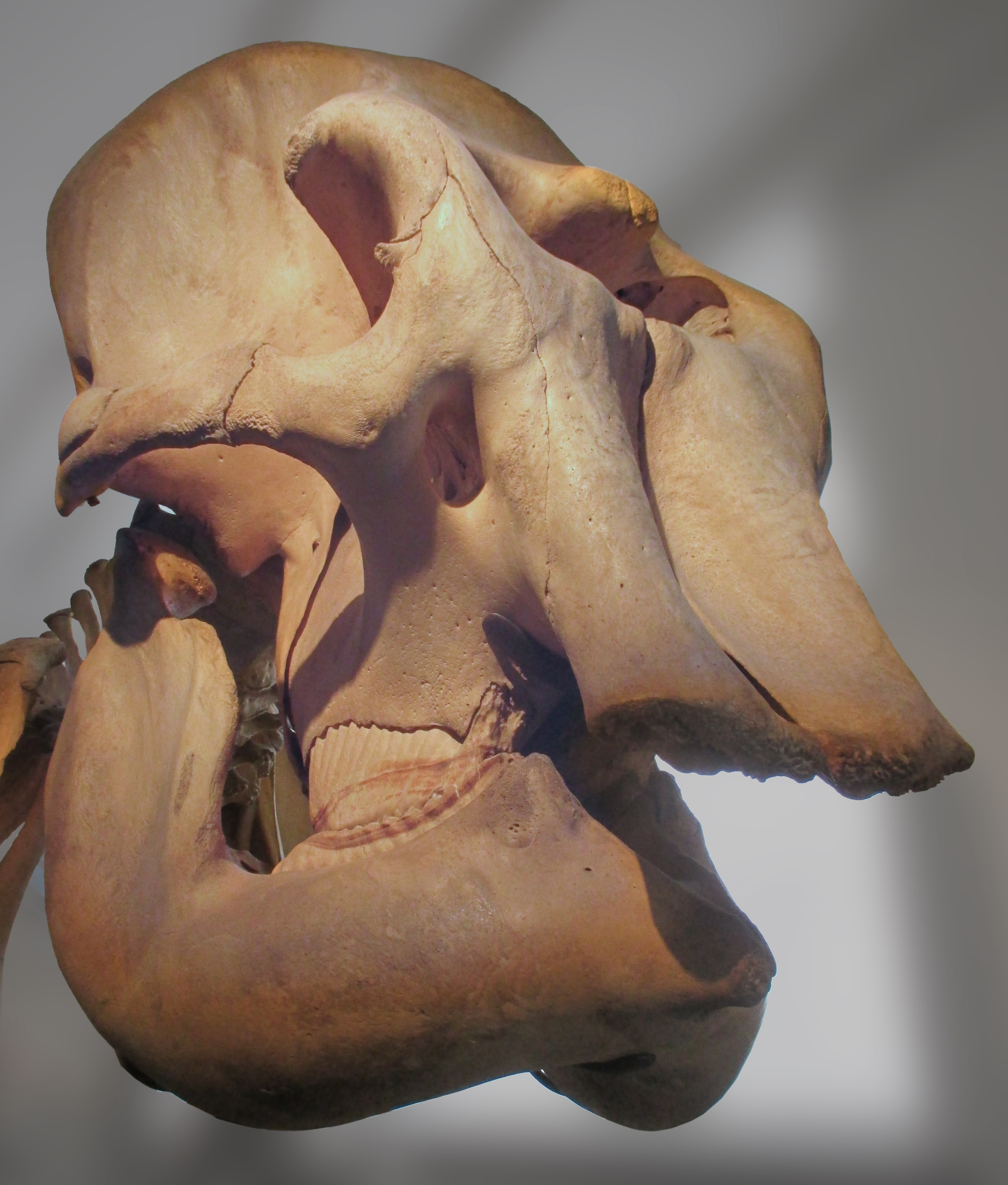
The skull of an Indian elephant at the Natural History Museum in Gothenburg

In general, the Asian elephant is smaller than African elephant. Its back is convex or level with the highest body point on its head. The species exhibits significant sexual dimorphism with a male reaching an average shoulder height of about 2.75 m (9 ft 0 in) and weighing up to 4,000 kg (8,800 lb) whereas a female reaches an average shoulder height of about 2.4 m (7 ft 10 in) and weighs up to 2,700 kg (6,000 lb), with specimens rarely exceeding 3.2 m (10 ft) and 5,400 kg (11,900 lb) in males and 2.54 m (8 ft 4 in) 4,160 kg (9,170 lb) in females. The largest Indian elephant was 3.43 m (11.3 ft) high at the shoulder. On average, it measures 5.5–6.5 m (18–21 ft) in length including the trunk.

It has a broader skull with a concave forehead and two dorsal bulges on the top. Two large laterally folded ears and a large trunk with one finger-like process are attached to the head. It has 20 pairs of ribs and 34 vertebrae. There are four large legs which are almost straight with broader toes and with five nail like structures on each foreleg and four on each of the hind-legs. The large legs help support the larger weight for longer periods without spending much energy with the broad feet helping to cushion against hard surfaces. It has a long tail measuring on average 1.2–1.5 m (3 ft 11 in – 4 ft 11 in) in length. The skin color is generally grey and lighter than that of E. m. maximus but darker than that of E. m. sumatranus. The skin is generally smoother than that of the African species and might consist of smaller patches of white depigmentation or grey spots. The body is covered by brownish to reddish hairs which reduce and darken with age. The female is usually smaller than the male with short or no tusks. There are about 29 narrow cheek teeth.

== Distribution and habitat ==
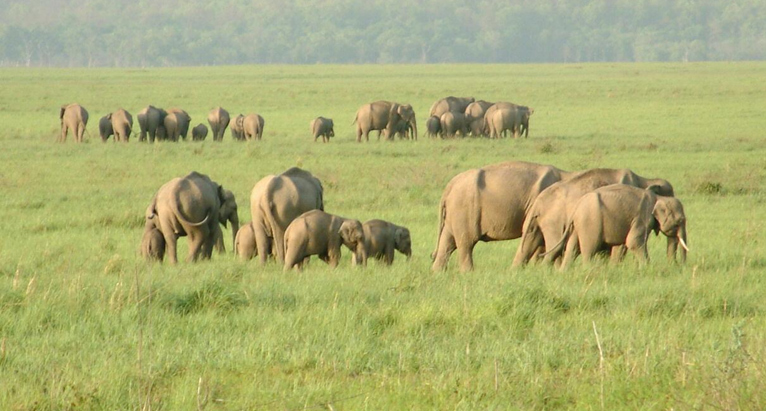
Indian elephant herd in Jim Corbett National Park

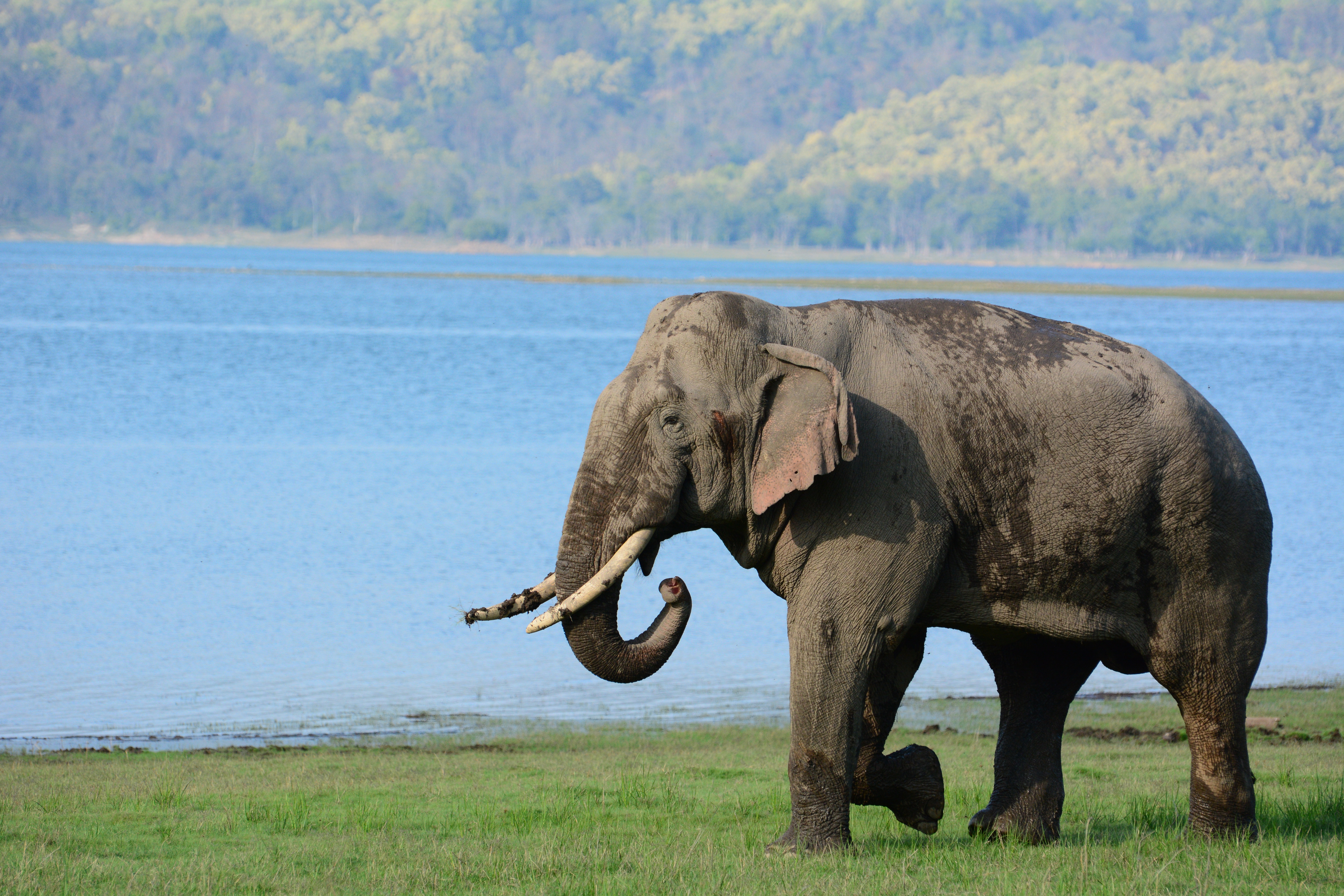
A lone tusker elephant in Jim Corbett National Park

The Indian elephant is native to mainland Asia with nearly three-fourth of the population found in India. The species is also found in other countries of the Indian subcontinent including Nepal, Bangladesh, Bhutan, and South East Asian countries including Myanmar, Thailand, Malaysia, Laos, Cambodia, and Vietnam with small populations in China. It is regionally extinct in Pakistan. It inhabits grasslands, dry deciduous, moist deciduous, evergreen and semi-evergreen forests. The total estimated wild population ranges from 23,000 to 41,000 individuals across the range. As per the 2017 census, the estimated wild population in India was 27,312 individuals which account for nearly three-fourths of the extant population.

The movement and habitat utilization patterns of an elephant population were studied in southern India during 1981–83 within a 1,130 km^{2} (440 sq mi) study area. The vegetation types of this area encompasses dry thorn forest at 250 to 400 m (820 to 1,310 ft), deciduous forest at 400 to 1,400 m (1,300 to 4,600 ft), stunted evergreen forest and grassland at 1,400 to 1,800 m (4,600 to 5,900 ft). Five different elephant clans, each consisting of between 50 and 200 individuals, had home ranges of between 105 km^{2} (41 sq mi) and 320 km^{2} (120 sq mi), which overlapped. They preferred habitat where water was available and food plants were palatable. During the dry months of January to April, they congregated at high densities of up to five individuals per km^{2} in river valleys, where they browsed plants that had a much higher protein content than the coarse tall grasses on hill slopes. With the onset of rains in May, they dispersed over a wider area at lower densities, largely into the tall grass forests, to feed on the fresh grasses, which then had a high protein value. During the second wet season from September to December, when the tall grasses became fibrous, they moved into lower elevation short grass open forests. The normal movement pattern could be upset during years of adverse environmental conditions. However, the movement pattern of elephants in this region has not basically changed for over a century, as inferred from descriptions recorded during the 19th century. In Nilgiri Biosphere Reserve, three elephant clans had overall home ranges of 562 km^{2} (217 sq mi), 670 km^{2} (260 sq mi) and 799 km^{2} (308 sq mi) in the beginning of the 1990s. During three years of survey, their annual home ranges overlapped to a large extent with only minor shifts in the home ranges between years.

There are about 138 identified elephant corridors in India, with the majority of the elephant population in India restricted to four general areas.

Elephant corridors in India
Region	Areas	Corridors	Area (km^{2})	Elephant population (2017)	Percentage of elephant population (2017)
North-East	From the eastern border of Nepal in northern West Bengal through western Assam along the Himalaya foothills as far as the Mishmi Hills, extending into eastern Arunachal Pradesh, the plains of upper Assam, and the foothills of Nagaland, to the Garo Hills of Meghalaya through the Khasi Hills, to parts of the lower Brahmaputra plains and Karbi Plateau; isolated herds occur in Tripura, Mizoram, Manipur, and in the Barak Valley districts of Assam	58	41,000	10,139	33.8%
East	In Odisha, Jharkhand, and in the southern part of West Bengal, with some animals wandering into Chhattisgarh	54	23,500	3,128	10.4%
North	At the foot of the Himalayas in Uttarakhand and Uttar Pradesh, ranging from Katarniaghat Wildlife Sanctuary to the Yamuna River	8	5,500	2,085	7.0%
South	Eight populations are fragmented from each other in northern Karnataka, in the crestline of Karnataka–Western Ghats, in Bhadra–Malnad, in Brahmagiri–Nilgiris–Eastern Ghats, in Nilambur–Silent Valley–Coimbatore, in Anamalai–Parambikulam, in Periyar–Srivilliputhur, and one in Agasthyamalai	46	40,000	14,612	48.8%

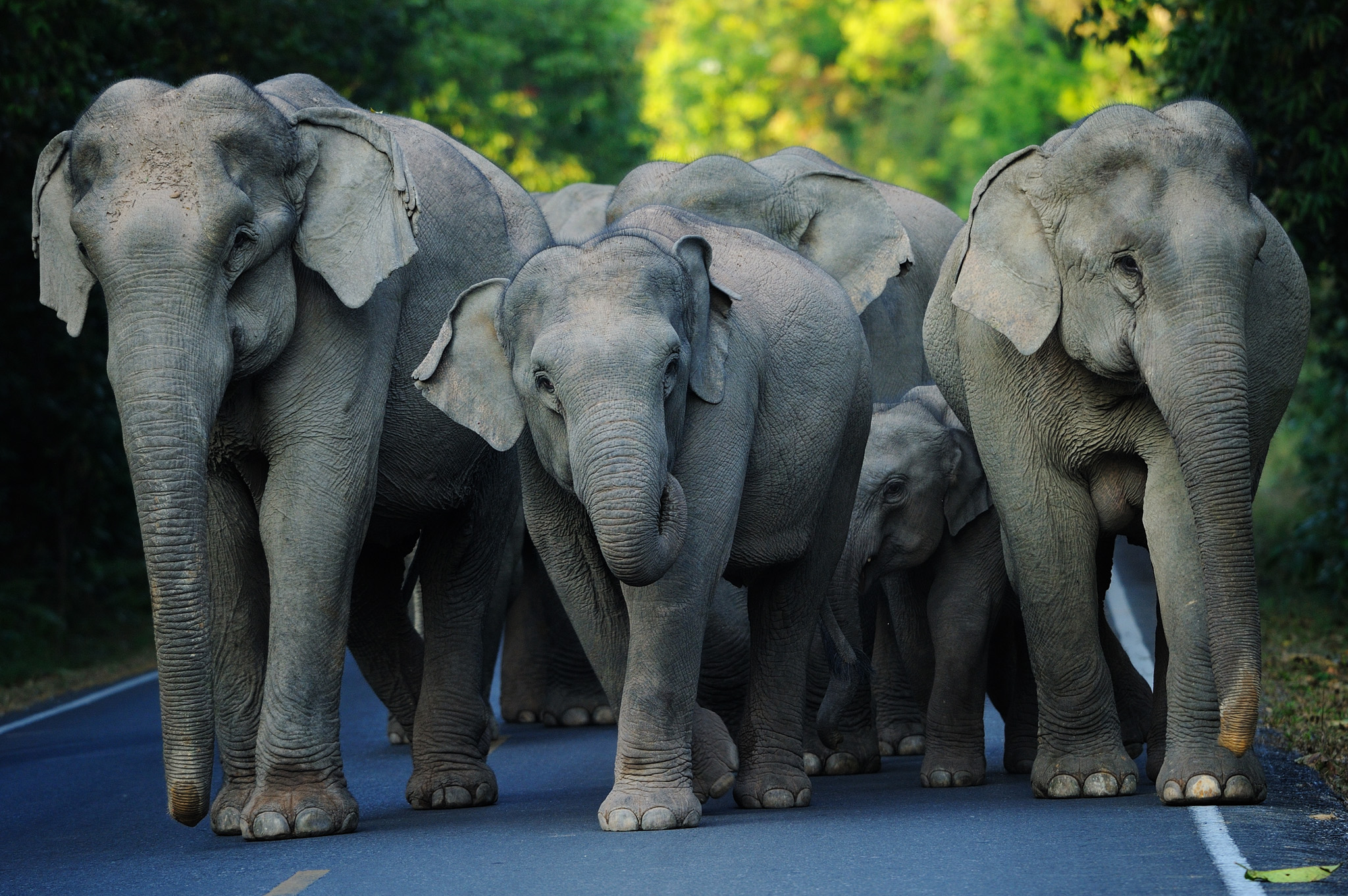
Indian elephant herd in Khao Yai National Park, Thailand

Apart from India, following is the distribution and estimated population of Indian elephants across Asia.

- 100–125 in Nepal, where their range is restricted to a few protected areas in the Terai along the border with India. In 2002, estimates ranged from 106 to 172 resident and migratory elephants, with most of them in Bardia National Park
- 150–250 in Bangladesh, where only isolated populations survive in the Chittagong Hills
- 250–500 in Bhutan, where their range is limited to protected areas in the south along the border with India
- 4,000–5,000 in Myanmar, where populations are highly fragmented, and occur in the northern ranges and Arakan Yoma in the west, Pegu Yoma of central Myanmar, Tenasserim and Shan State
- 2,500–3,200 in Thailand, mainly in the mountains along the border with Myanmar, with smaller fragmented populations occurring in the peninsula in the south
- 2,100–3,100 in Malaysia
- 500–1,000 Laos, where they remain widely but patchily distributed in forested areas, both in the highlands and lowlands
- 200–250 in China, where they survive only in the prefectures of Xishuangbanna, Simao, and Lincang of southern Yunnan
- 250–600 in Cambodia, where they primarily inhabit the mountains of the south-west and in Mondulkiri and Ratanakiri Provinces
- 70–150 in the southern parts of Vietnam

== Behavior and ecology ==
=== Diet and feeding ===
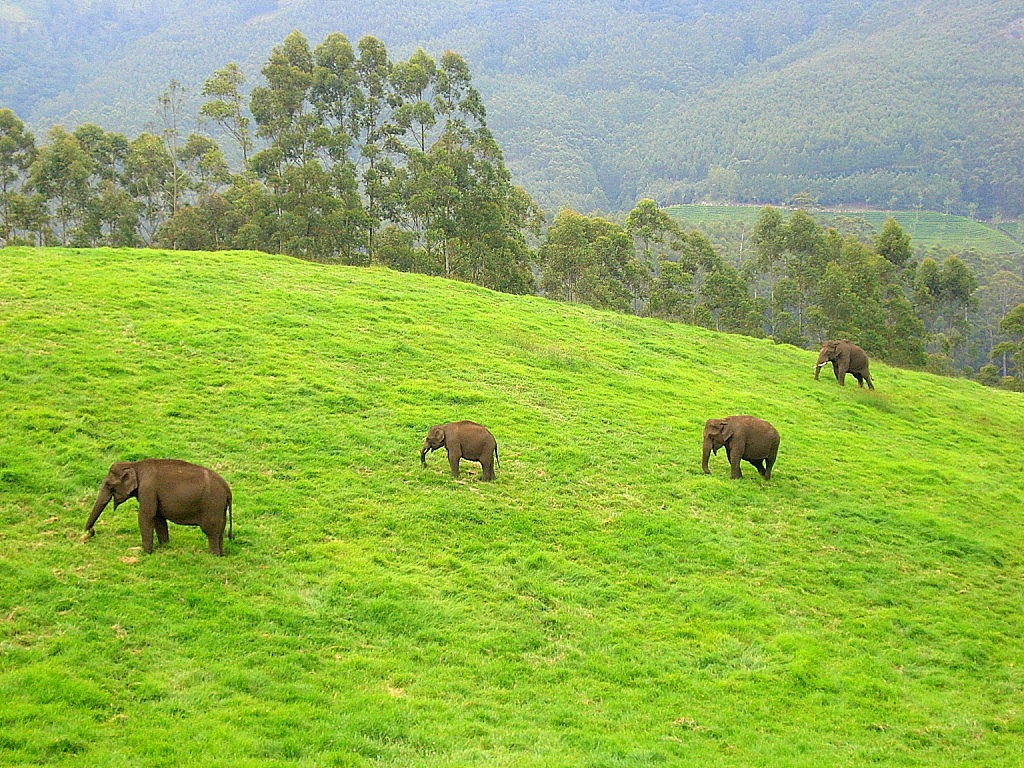
Indian elephants foraging on open grasslands in Munnar, Kerala

Elephant is classified as a megaherbivore and can consume up to 150 kg (330 lb) of plant matter per day. It can spend up to 19 hours a day foraging for food and can produce up to 220 pounds of dung per day. It is a generalist feeder and both a grazer and a browser. In a study area of 1,130 km^{2} (440 sq mi) in southern India, elephants were recorded to feed on 112 different plant species, most commonly of the order Malvales, and the legume, palm, sedge and true grass families. They graze on the tall grasses, but the portion consumed varies with season. When the new flush appears in April, they remove the tender blades in small clumps. Later, when grasses are higher than 0.5 m (1 ft 8 in), they uproot entire clumps, dust them and consume the fresh leave tops, but discard the roots. When grasses are mature in autumn, they clean and consume the succulent basal portions with the roots, and discard the fibrous blades. From the bamboos, they eat seedlings, culms and lateral shoots. During the dry season from January to April, they mainly browse on both leaves and twigs preferring the fresh foliage, and consume thorn bearing shoots of acacia species without any obvious discomfort. They feed on the bark of white thorn and other flowering plants, and consume the fruits of wood apple, tamarind, kumbhi and date palm.

During a study in a tropical moist mixed deciduous forested area of 160 km^{2} (62 sq mi) in Assam, elephants were observed to feed on about 20 species of grasses, plants and trees. Grasses such as Imperata cylindrica and Leersia hexandra constituted the most predominant component of their diet. In Nepal's Bardia National Park, elephants consume large amounts of the floodplain grass, particularly during the monsoon season. They browse more in the dry season with bark constituting a major part of their diet.

=== Social structure ===
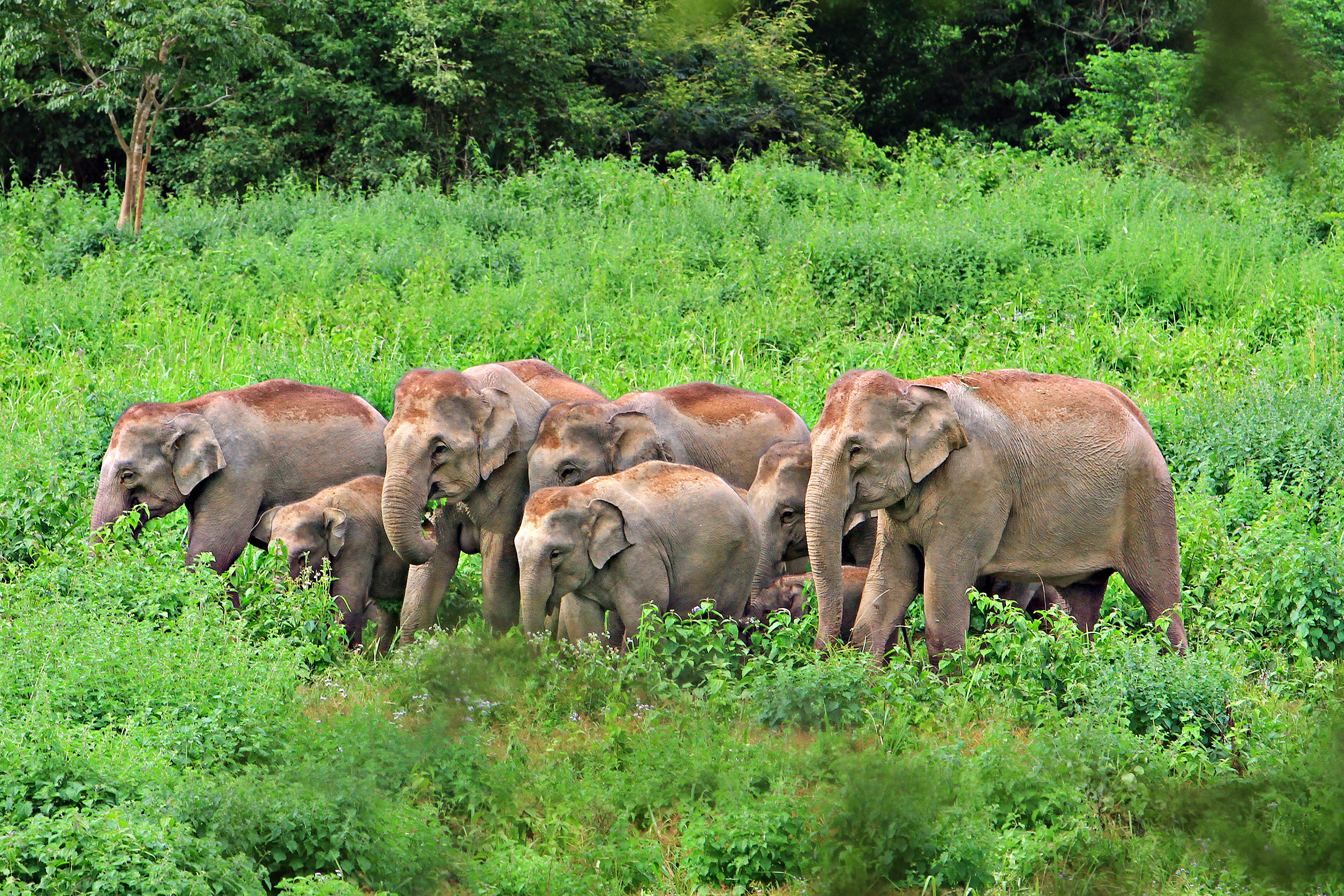
Indian elephant herd in Kui Buri National Park, Thailand

Indian elephants typically live in small herds consisting of related females, their female offspring and young immature males. The elephants are extremely social animals and form complex social relationships. They often work together as a group to raise their young and to protect the herd. While individual herds might not have a designated matriarch, older females will take on a more dominant role within the herd. A male elephant is typically encouraged to leave the herd once it reaches puberty which often happens between the ages of 8 and 13. This is a gradual process most of the time and is determined by the male's competitive and independent nature and the tolerance of the herd. Juvenile males tend to form loose herds while they typically become independent on ageing.

=== Communication and intelligence ===
An elephant communicates using low-pitched sounds and infrasonic grunts or rumbles. Various sounds are produced that can communicate specific information to other elephants over long distances. A female make different calls and low-frequency vocalizations to warn of predators. An elephant has a developed olfactory system and is able to discern various scents. Wind-born scents can be sensed and used to communicate clues regarding the presence of other elephants or potential dangers. The trunk is also used for greeting other elephants and communication of emotions such as excitement, competition, dominance, discipline, reassurance etc. An elephant has a large brain which weighs between 4–6 kg (8.8–13.2 lb). It is a highly intelligent animal with a great capacity to learn new things. Much of elephant behavior is learned from the elders over the years rather than being instinctive.

=== Lifespan and mortality ===
Indian elephant has a lifespan between 40 and 65 years with some animals reported to have lived for more than 75 years. As per available evidence, an Indian elephant may typically live into their mid-50s, but there is no consistent data available to accurately estimate the lifespan of wild elephants. The median life expectancy for female elephants was estimated to be 47 years old. An adult elephant has no enemies in the wild, except for humans. However, young elephants are often susceptible to attacks by carnivorous predators such as tigers in the areas where their ranges overlap. When a predator is visible, elder members of the herd may emit warning calls that prompt the rest of the herd to group together for protection.

=== Reproduction ===
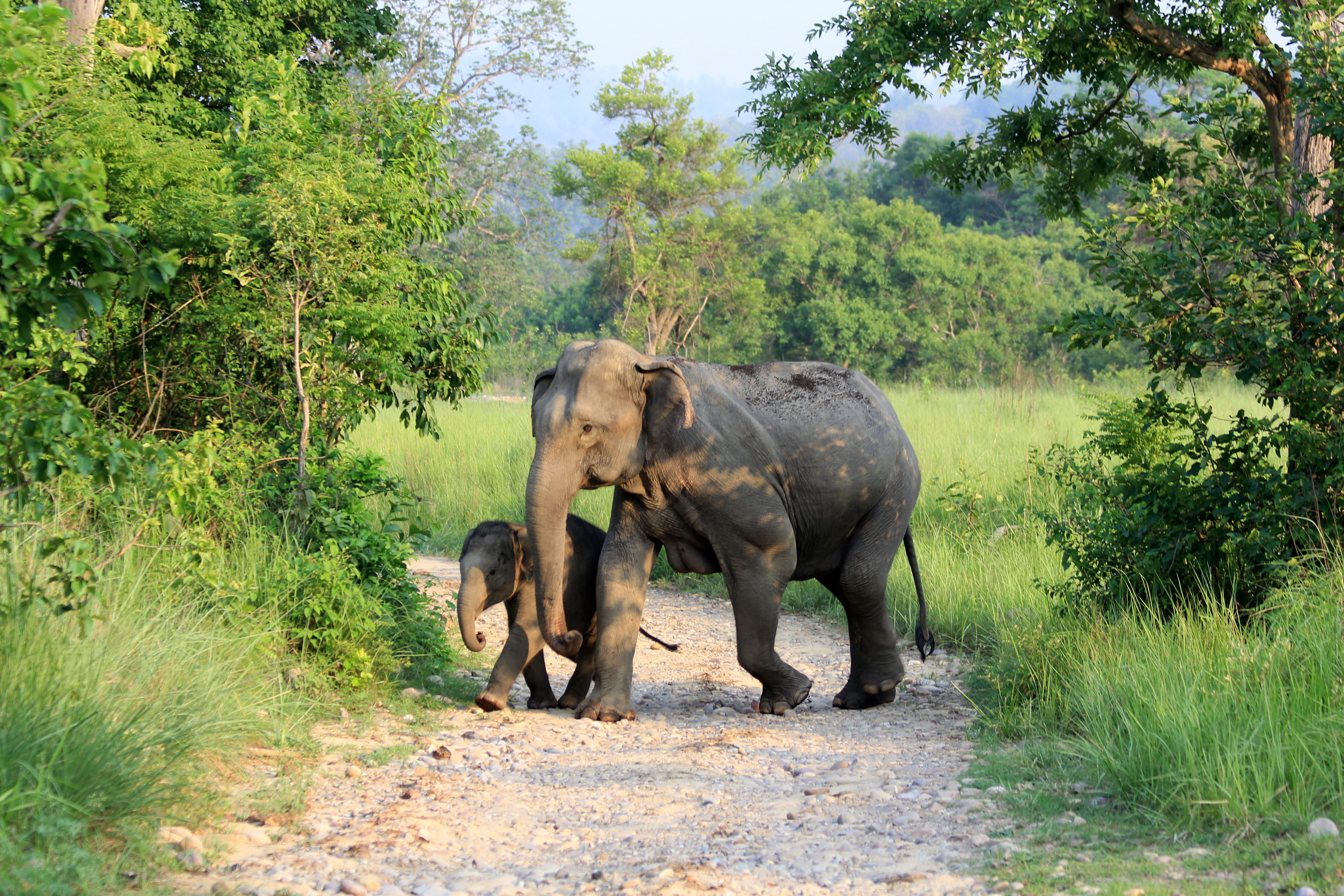
An Indian elephant cow with her calf

A female produces various noises to indicate her presence and readiness to male bulls. An elephant can determine the identity, sex and reproductive status of another elephant using its trunks to smell the elephant's mouth, temporal gland, genitals, urine or dung. An Indian elephant reaches sexual maturity between 8 and 13 years of age but might not mate until later. While a female might bear calves starting a few years later, a male is unlikely to become a father until the 30s due to competition with older, larger males. An older male experiences a period of heightened sexual and aggressive activity called musth, which is caused by the production of large quantities of testosterone. During the period, a green fluid secreted from the elephant's temporal glands drips from the penis. A female ovulates once about every 115 days and if fertilized, the gestation period is about 22 months, the longest gestation period of any animal.

Most often, a female gives birth to a single calf (occasionally two might be born), which may weigh between 68–158 kg (150–348 lb). A calf is able to stand and nurse soon after birth and start to feed on solid food by six months. A calf will also eat its mother's dung for several years, which contain nutrients and symbiotic bacteria that aid in the digestion of plant food. A female might not give birth to another calf for an interval of three to eight years, depending on environmental conditions. A calf is weaned slowly and might often continue to be nursed by the mother until she delivers another calf or if it reaches puberty. While a male leaves its natal herd at sexual maturity, a female remain within the herd throughout its life.

== Status and conservation ==
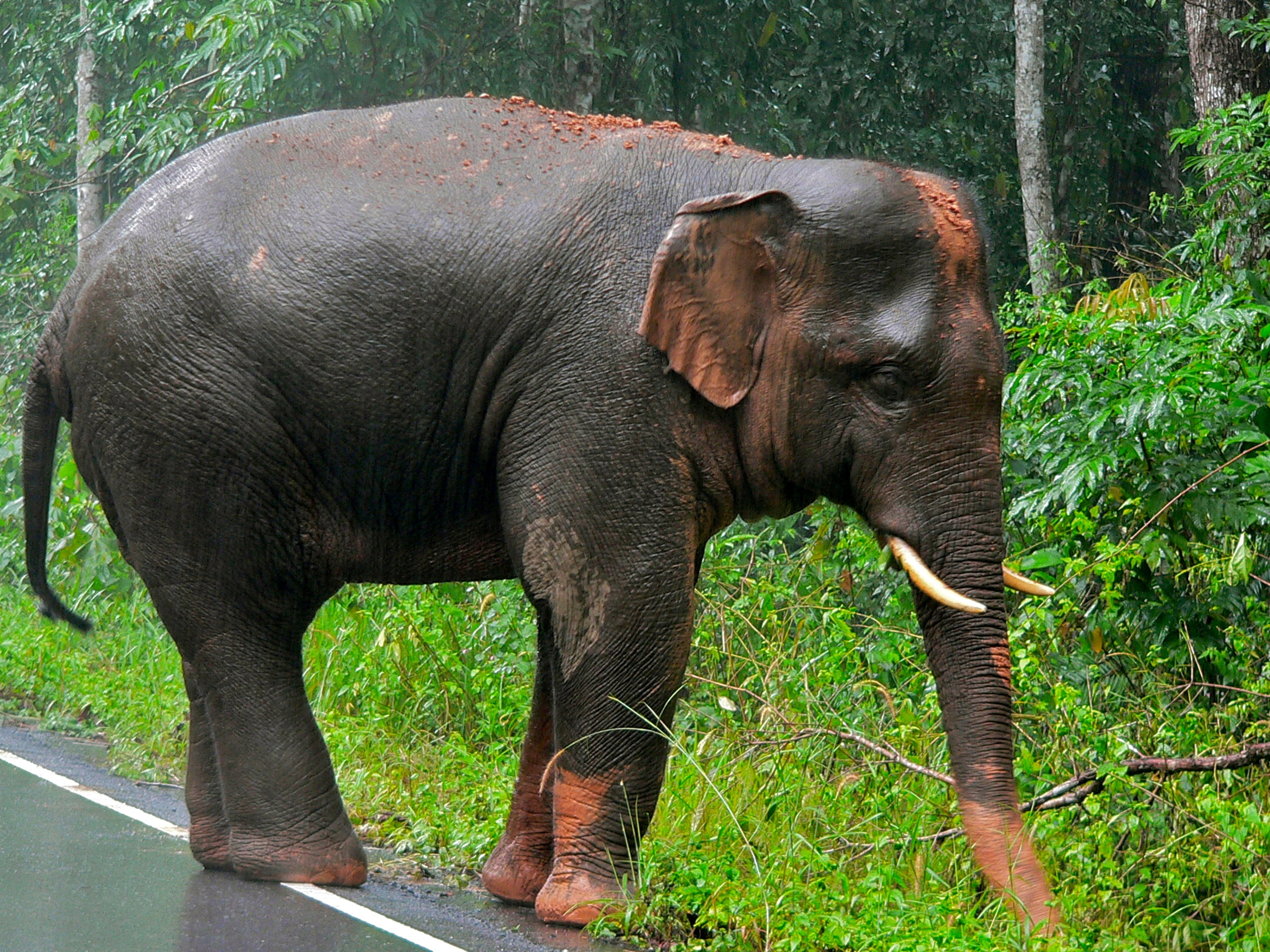
An Indian elephant foraging on a roadside

Since 1986, the Asian elephant has been listed as Endangered on the IUCN Red List as the wild population has declined by at least 50% over the last three elephant generations. The species is threatened by environmental degradation, habitat loss and fragmentation, which are driven by an expanding human population and in turn lead to increasing conflicts between humans and elephants when elephants eat or trample crops. Significant extents of elephant range and suitable habitat has been lost with their free movement impeded by reservoirs and dams, hydroelectric projects and associated canals, numerous pockets of cultivation and plantations, highways, railway lines, mining and other industrial development. Poaching of elephants for ivory is a serious threat in some parts of Asia. Poaching of tuskers impact the sex ratios that become highly female biased and the genetic variation is reduced with a decline in fecundity and recruitment. In a study conducted at the Periyar Tiger Reserve, Poaching has dramatically skewed adult sex ratios between 1969 and 1989 with the adult male:female sex ratio changing from 1:6 to 1:122. In India, elephant mortality also occurs due to railway accidents with railway track running across elephant corridors. Elephants that pass through from one forest patch to another dash against the trains and die. In East India, a total of 39 dead elephants were reported during the period of 1958 to 2008, of which ten were reportedly killed between 2004 and 2008. Electrocution due to contact with electric poles and transformers has been reported as another major threat to elephants in India, with an estimated 461 elephants having been electrocuted between 2009 and 2017.

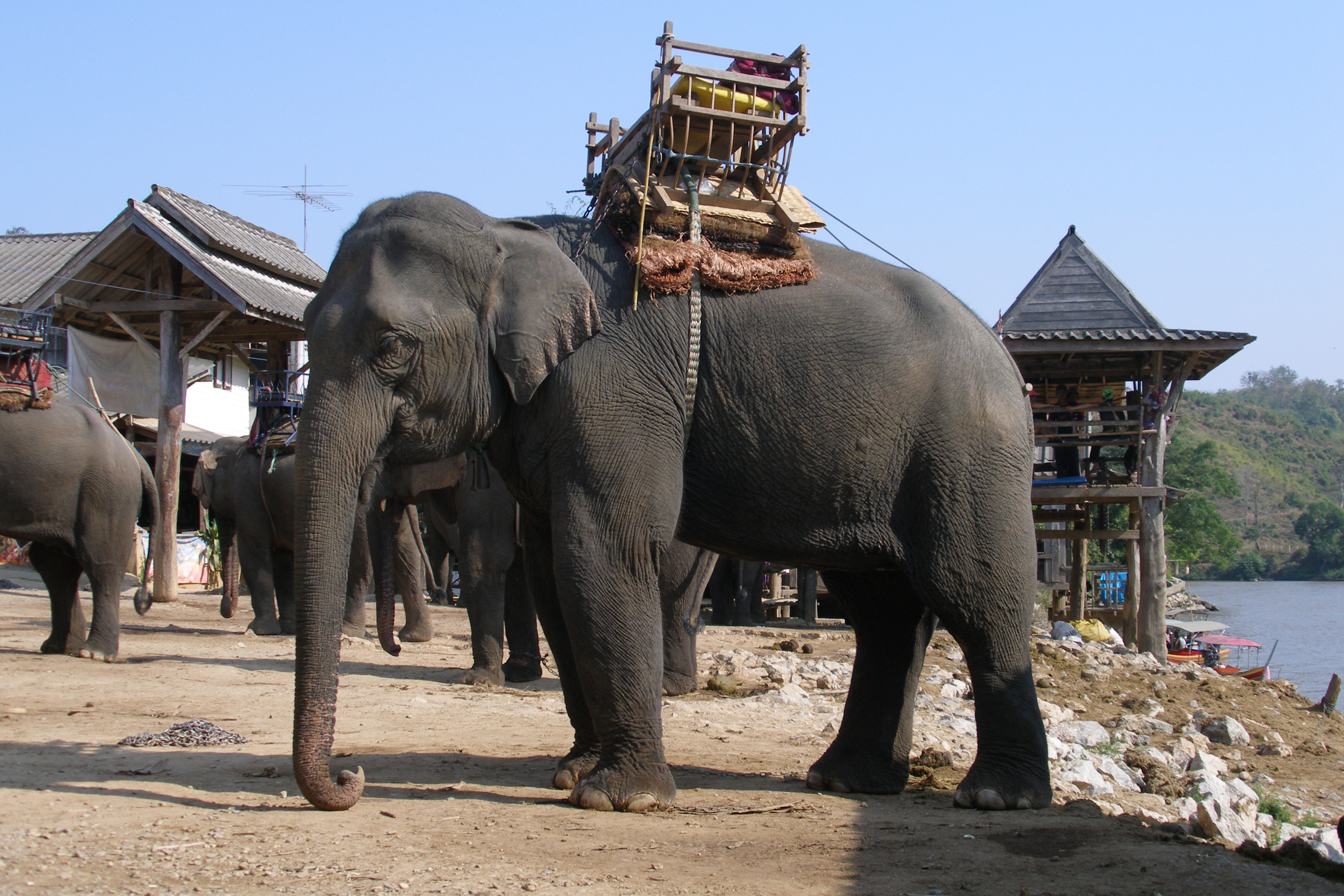
Captive Indian elephant in Thailand

In Bangladesh, forested areas that served as prime elephant habitat have undergone drastic reduction, which had a severe impact on the wild elephant population. Habitat loss and fragmentation is attributed to the increasing human population and its need for fuel wood and timber which results in illegal logging resulting in deforestation and habitat degradation. As a result of the shrinking habitat, elephants have become prone to coming into direct conflict with humans. In Myanmar, demand for elephant ivory has led to poaching with ivory trade providing significant income. In the clandestine market, prices of raw ivory increased from $76 per kilogram in 1989–90 to over $200 per kilogram by the mid-1990s with foreign tourists often responsible for the demand which fuels the illegal killing of elephants. There is also a sizeable trade in ivory chopsticks and carvings, smuggled by traders from Myanmar into China. Many elephants are also captured, raised in captivity and used for various purposes such as logging, tourism, religious festivals and show events. Young wild-born elephant calves are separated from their mothers in Myanmar for use in Thailand's tourism industry. The mothers are often killed in the process of capturing and the calves are placed alongside already captive unrelated cows. Then the calves are often subjected to a 'breaking in' process, which may involve being tied up, confined, starved, beaten and tortured, as a result of which two-thirds may perish.

== Conservation ==
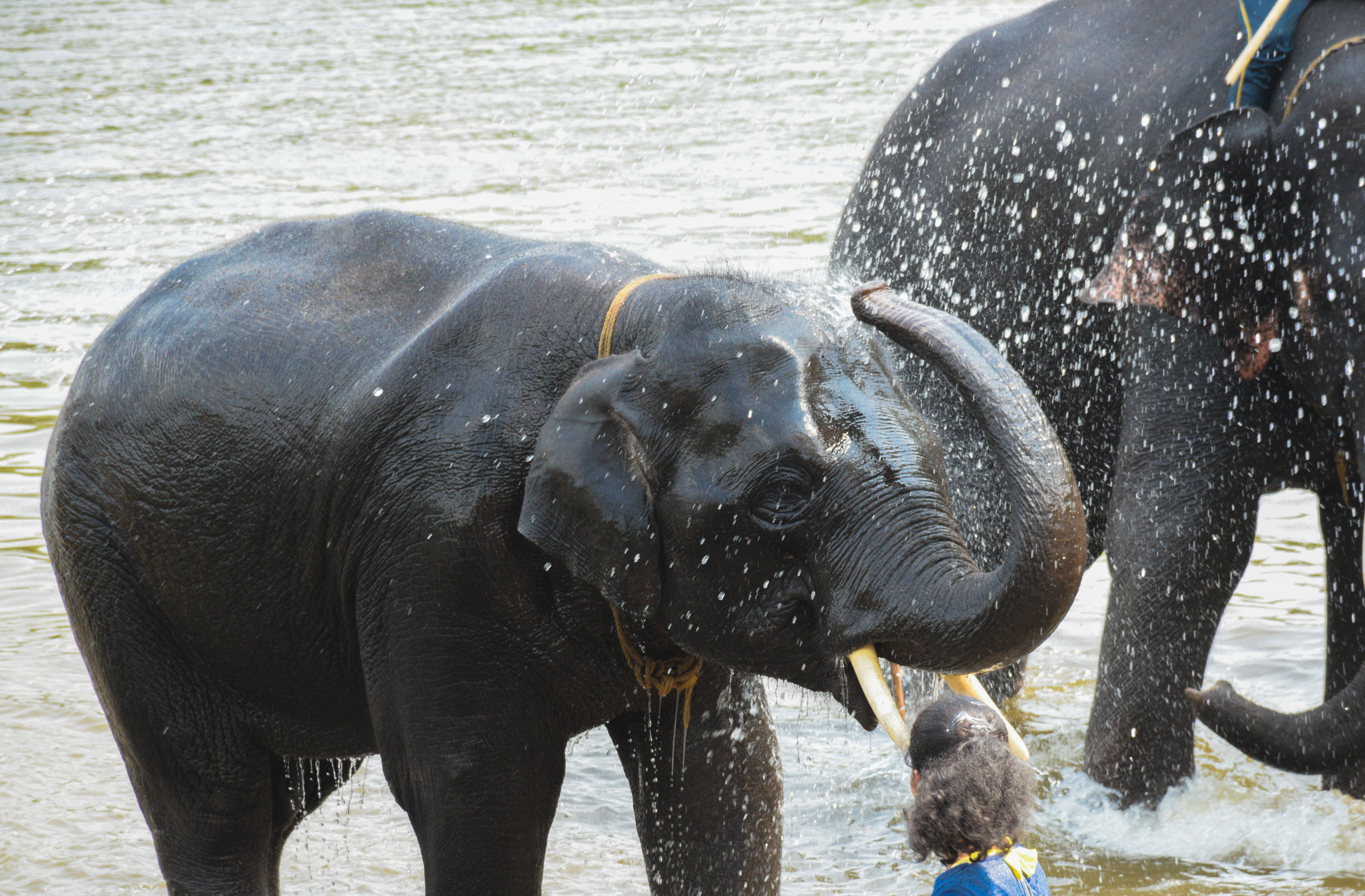
At Mudumalai National Park

The Indian elephant is a protected species under Schedule I of the Indian Wild Life Protection Act, 1972. Project Elephant was launched in 1992 by the Ministry of Environment and Forests of Government of India to provide financial and technical support of wildlife management efforts by the states. The project aims to ensure long-term survival of viable conservation reliant populations of elephants in their natural habitats by protecting the elephants, their habitats and migration corridors. It also sought to enable various activities to address the issue of human-animal conflict, promote the welfare of elephants in captivity, support research of the ecology and management of elephants, creating conservation awareness among local people and providing improved veterinary care for captive elephants. As of December 2023, there are 33 notified elephant reserves in India, covering 80,778 km^{2} (31,189 sq mi).

== Culture ==
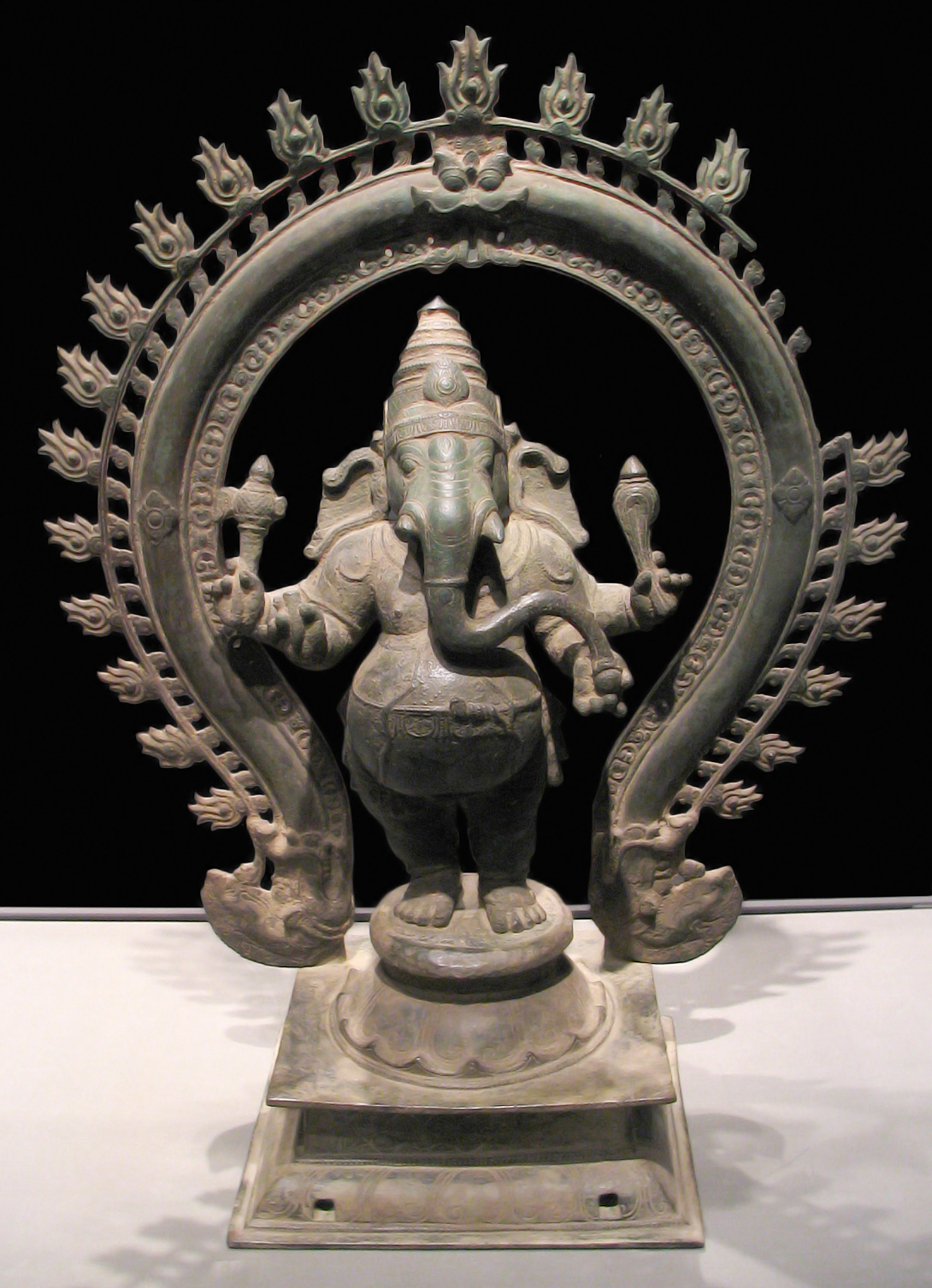
Hindu god Ganesha

The Indian elephant is a cultural symbol throughout its range in Asia and appears in various religious traditions and mythologies. The elephants are treated positively and are sometimes revered as deities, often symbolizing strength, wisdom and good fortune. It is revered as a form of Ganesha in Hinduism. Although Ganesha has many attributes, he is readily identified by his elephant head. It is also revered as a part of Buddhist pantheon of gods. Elephants are often used as part of temples and elaborate rituals. They form an important part of Hindu festivals like Dussehra and Pooram.

In India, it has been designated the national heritage animal. It is the national animal of Thailand and Laos. The Indian elephant is also the state animal of the Indian states of Jharkhand, Karnataka, Kerala and Odisha.

== See also ==
- Elephants in Kerala culture
- Elephants in Thailand
- List of individual elephants
