= Helen Burwell Chapin =

American scholar (1892 – 1950)

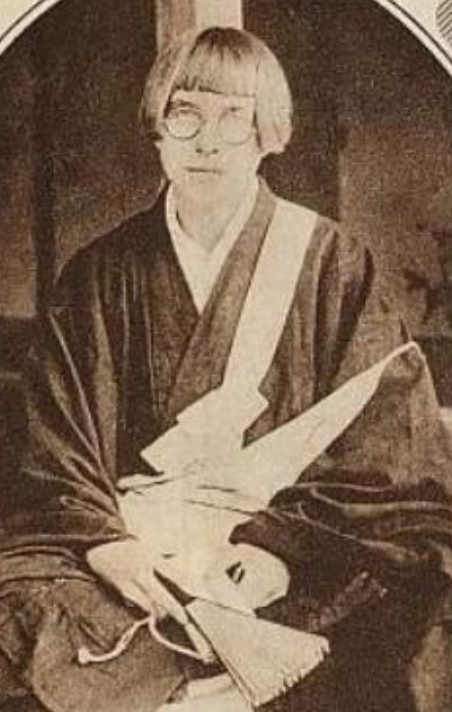
- Helen Burwell Chapin, wearing a kimono, from a 1927 publication
- Born: October 18, 1892; Wayne, Pennsylvania, U.S.
- Died: March 1, 1950 (age 57); Washington, D.C., U.S.
- Education: Bryn Mawr College
- Occupations: Librarian, art historian, art collector, poet, translator

Helen Burwell Chapin (October 18, 1892 – March 1, 1950) was an American scholar, librarian, art historian, art collector, poet, and translator, who studied and traveled in Japan, China, India, Ceylon, and Korea in the 1920s and 1930s.

== Early life and education ==
Chapin was born in Wayne, Pennsylvania, the daughter of George Walter Chapin and Valeria Jenkins Chapin. Her father was a textile merchant. Initially, she attended the Baldwin School, and graduated from Bryn Mawr College (a private women's college in Pennsylvania) in 1915. She earned a master's degree at Mills College in 1935, and completed doctoral studies at the University of California, Berkeley, in 1940. Her dissertation was titled "Toward the Study of the Sword as Dynastic Talisman: The Feng-ch'eng Pair and the Sword of Han Kao Tsu".

== Career ==
Chapin was an editorial assistant at a publishing house in Philadelphia after college. She was working at the Boston Museum of Fine Arts when she became interested in East Asian cultures. She went to work at the American consulate in Shanghai in 1924, and traveled around China by bicycle. She moved to Tokyo to work at the 1926 Pan-Pacific Congress. She became more interested in Buddhism, and lived in the Yakushi-ji Temple in Nara for several months. A 1927 publication dubbed her "the first bobbed Buddhist nun in Japan".

Chapin also traveled in Korea, Ceylon and India, visiting sites important to Buddhism, and spent months studying and cataloguing holdings of the British Museum. From 1929 to 1932, she returned to Japan and China on a research fellowship from Swarthmore College, and was granted access to the Shōsōin temple's storehouse of eighth-century artifacts.

In 1932, Chapin was temporary head of the Japanese collection at Columbia University, and worked for the Japanese Society of New York. She was art librarian at Mills College in the mid-1930s. During World War II, she worked in the United States Department of Justice as a research analyst, and after the war went to Korea with the United States Army as a monuments specialist.

== Publications ==
Chapin's research appeared in scholarly journals including The Art Bulletin, Journal of the American Oriental Society, Artibus Asiae, Harvard Journal of Asiatic Studies, and Archives of the Chinese Art Society of America.

- "Themes of the Japanese Netsuke-Carver" (1922)
- "A Theme of a Japanese Netsuke" (1924)
- "A Study in Buddhist Iconography: The Six-Armed Form of Cintamani-cakra" (1932)
- "The Ch'an Master Pu-Tai" (1933)
- "The Gion Shrine and the Gion Festival" (1934)
- "A Chinese Ganeśa" (1935)
- The Story of Gio (1935, translator)
- "Ganeśa in Hindu Legend and Art" (1938)
- "A Long Roll of Buddhist Images" (1936, 1938; revised in 1970, 1971 by Alexander C. Soper)
- "Yunnanese Images of Avalokiteśvara" (1944)
- "Three Early Portraits of Bodhidharma" (1945, 1946)
- "Kyongju, Ancient Capital of Silla" (1948)
- "A Little-Known Temple in South Korea and its Treasures: A Preliminary Reconnaissance" (1948)
- "A Hitherto Unpublished Great Silla Pagoda" (1949)

=== Poetry ===
- "Ti'en-Lung Shan in May" and "The Forbidden City"(1935)
- "Spring Longings at Ch'ang-an" and "Among the Hills" (1935, with Lu Lun)
- "Night Near the Maple Bridge" (1935, with Chang Chi)
- "Passing by Pao-Ch'ing Temple" (1935, with Ssu Wen-ming)
- "Roads in Loyang" (1935, with Yü Wu-ling)
- "A Song of Separation" (!935, with Fan Yün)
- The Round of the Year (1936, translations of Chinese poetry)
- Echoes (1938)

== Personal life and legacy ==
Chapin died from cancer in 1950, at the age of 57, in Washington, D.C. Chapin left a large collection of objects related to her studies and travels, including hundreds of books, diaries, art, stone, lacquer, bronze, and porcelain objects, scrolls and robes, to Bryn Mawr College.
