= Martin Muntor =

Fictional character

- First appearance: Gasp! A Novel of Revenge
- Last appearance: Find Virgil
- Created by: Frank Freudberg

In-universe information
- Gender: Male
- Occupation: News editor

Martin Muntor is a fictional character and cult hero in the thriller novels Gasp! and the re-written version, Find Virgil, by Frank Freudberg.

== Character information ==
Muntor is a broken-down news editor in Philadelphia whose diagnosis of terminal lung cancer (manifested from second-hand smoke in the Find Virgil version) spurs him to take revenge on the U.S. tobacco industry. Muntor's plan is to kill 400 innocent people with cyanide-laced cigarettes in an effort to gain publicity and destroy the businesses that make tobacco products. Muntor also targets Nick Pratt, the CEO of TobacCo, Inc. When Muntor launches his attacks, they are many times more effective than he had anticipated. The nation becomes obsessed with the unfolding events, Muntor taunts the FBI and news organizations, and issues ultimata to tobacco industry leaders. Nick Pratt, in turn, dispatches a private investigator (unwittingly backed up by an assassin) to find the man who identifies himself as "Virgil". As Muntor's advancing cancer lessens his ability to continue his campaign, he offers a deal to the FBI and the industry: if the cigarette manufacturers put up $100 million for cancer research then he will stop the murders. In the end, as the authorities close in, Muntor corners Pratt. But instead of killing Pratt as planned, Muntor commits suicide by taking a deep drag on the poisoned cigarette he was going to force Pratt to smoke.

== Creator ==
Frank Freudberg (born April 12, 1953 in Philadelphia) is a novelist, journalist and ghostwriter. His novels Gasp (Barricade Books, New York, 1996), Find Virgil (Inside Job Media, Philadelphia, 2013) and Baby Please Don’t Go (Inside Job Media, Philadelphia, 2015) examine underdogs and their battles with forces seemingly more powerful than they are. Freudberg lives in Wayne, Pennsylvania near Philadelphia.

He has contributed to or been written about by Reuters, Associated Press, the Los Angeles Times, USA Today, Der Spiegel and others. His work has been mentioned in many notable publications including Time, Newsweek, and The Guardian.

== FBI Investigation ==
In the Spring of 2000, an FBI agent and police arrived at Freudberg's residence. Freudberg was told that they were following up on a report that had come into Attorney General Janet Reno's office and he was questioned. Freudberg explained that the novel was fiction, not a memoir. At the conclusion of the interview, Freudberg autographed a hardback copy of the novel for the agent.
