= Wayne Hotel =

- U.S. National Register of Historic Places
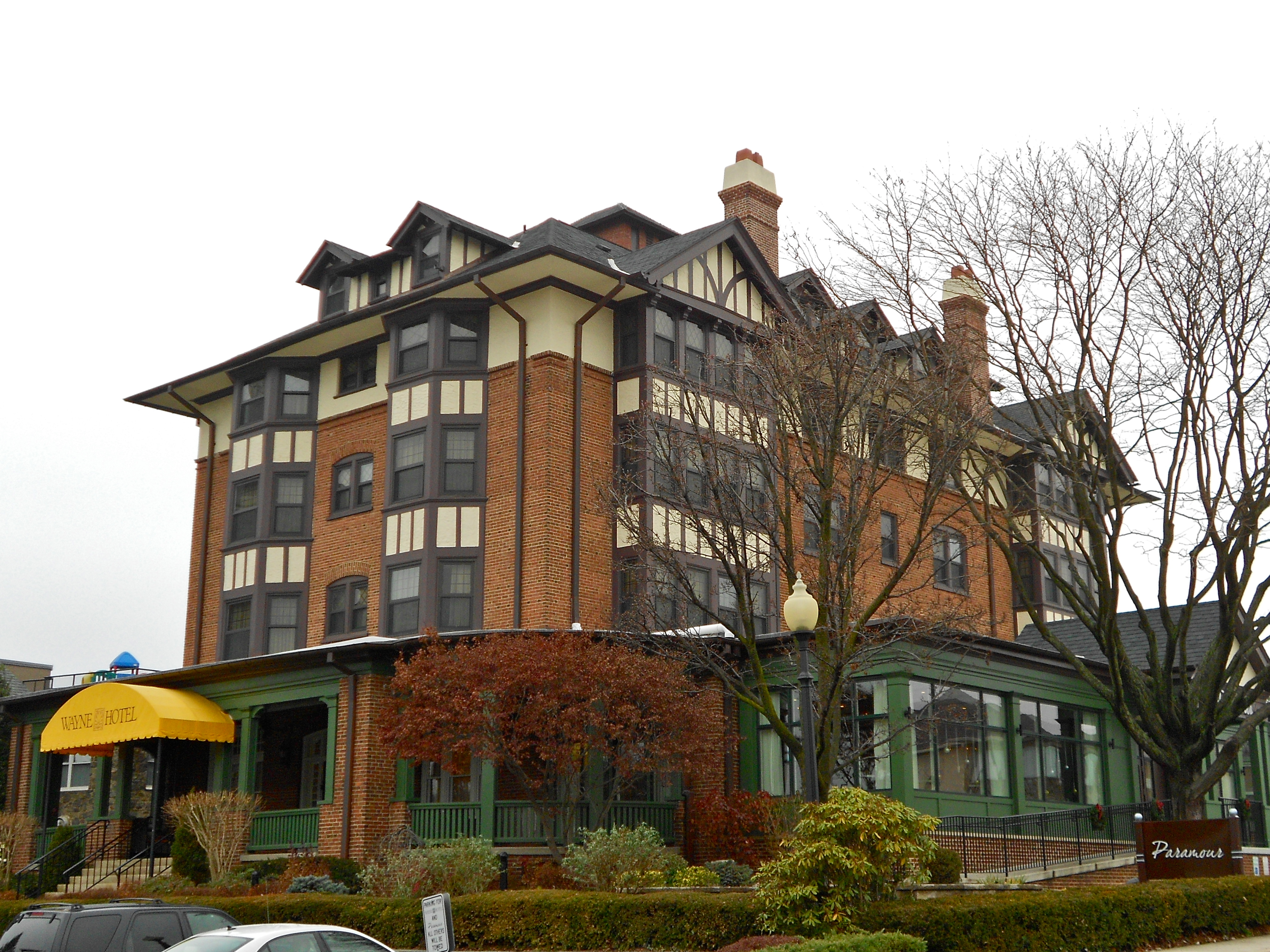
- Wayne Hotel, December 2012

- Location within Pennsylvania Location within the United States
- Location: 139 E. Lancaster Ave., Wayne, Pennsylvania
- Coordinates: 40°2′38″N 75°23′12″W
- Area: 0.8 acres (0.32 ha)
- Built: 1906
- Architect: Langel, Jonathan D.
- Architectural style: Tudor Revival
- NRHP reference No.: 87001966
- Added to NRHP: November 5, 1987

The Wayne Hotel, formerly known as The Waynewood, is an historic hotel that is located in Wayne, Delaware County, Pennsylvania, United States.

It was added to the National Register of Historic Places in 1987.

== History and architectural features ==
Built in 1906, this historic structure is a five-story, Tudor Revival building, with a two-story rear extension. It is built using brick and stucco with false Half Timbering and features a one-story, wraparound porch with a semi-circular dining projection and two projecting bay windows that extend from the second to fourth floors.

Local entrepreneur Stephen W. Bajus purchased the property in the 1980s. After a complete refurbishment, the hotel offered all of the usual modern amenities, including a restaurant, a private room for dining and meetings and forty guest rooms plus two luxury suites and fourteen off-site luxury furnished apartments for longer-term stays.

== Gallery ==
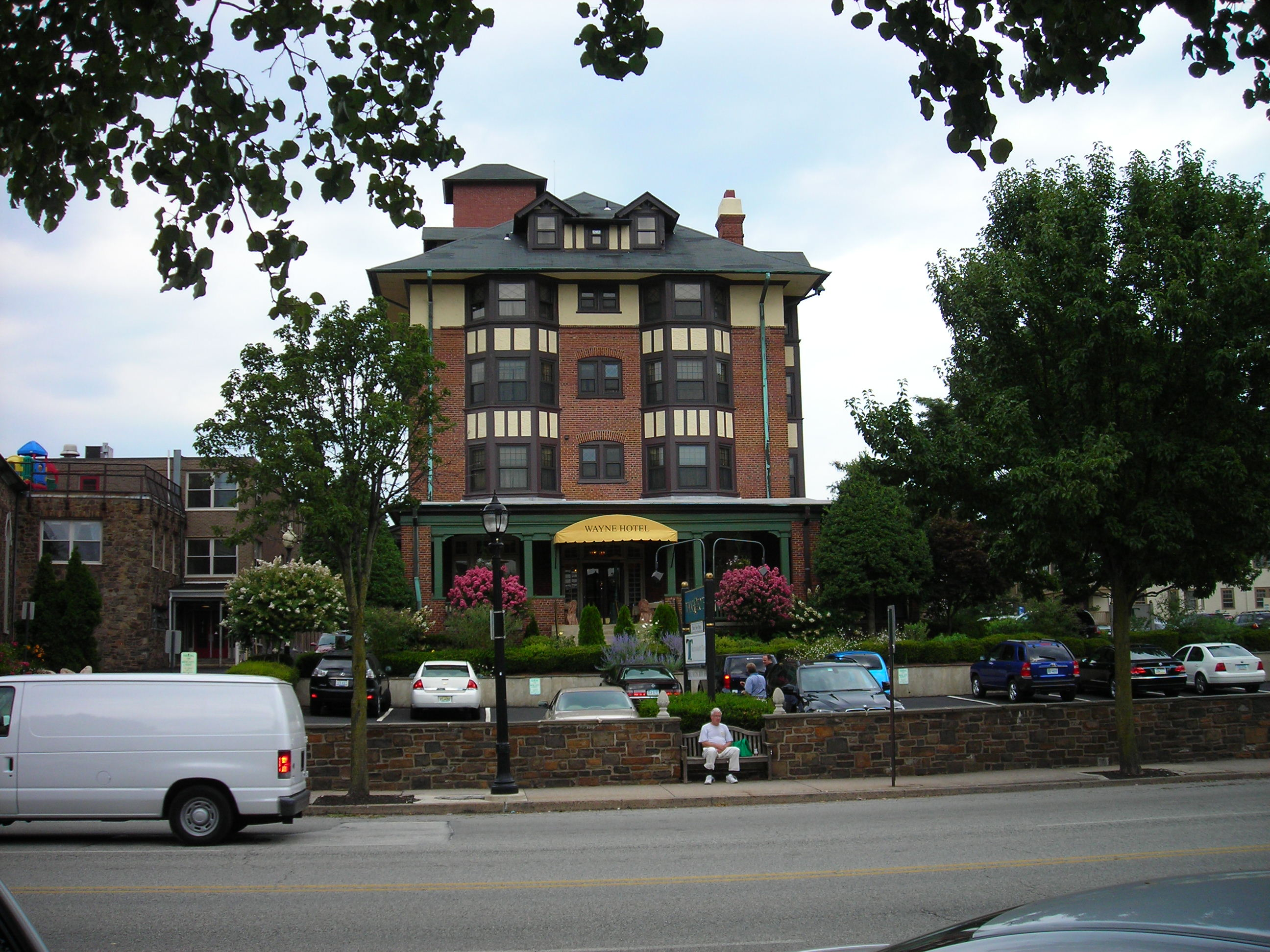
Wayne Hotel, August 2008
