= Hiram Cleaver =

American politician (1801–1877)

Member of the Pennsylvania House of Representatives from the Delaware County district
- In office 1856–1857
- Preceded by: Charles D. Manley
- Succeeded by: Thomas D. Powell

Personal details
- Born: August 20, 1801 Wayne, Pennsylvania, U.S.
- Died: July 17, 1877 (aged 75) Easttown Township, Pennsylvania, U.S.
- Resting place: Great Valley Baptist Church Cemetery; Devon, Pennsylvania, U.S.
- Party: Republican
- Spouses: Jane Abraham (m. 1832; died 1854) Sarina D. Jones (m. 1856)
- Children: 6
- Occupation: Politician; blacksmith; farmer

Hiram Cleaver (August 20, 1801 – July 17, 1877) was an American politician from Pennsylvania. He served as a member of the Pennsylvania House of Representatives, representing Delaware County from 1856 to 1857.

== Early life ==
Hiram Cleaver was born on August 20, 1801, in Wayne, Pennsylvania, to Ann (née Sturgess) and Isaac Cleaver. His father was a blacksmith.

== Career ==
As a young man, Cleaver worked as a blacksmith at the Spread Eagle shops in Radnor Township. He later purchased his father-in-law's farm on Lancaster Pike and worked the land. In 1869, he purchased "Cottage Home" farm near Leopard, Easttown Township.

Cleaver was a Republican. He was elected as a school director in Radnor Township in 1845 and 1860. He served as justice of the peace of Radnor Township from 1855 to 1869. He served as a member of the Pennsylvania House of Representatives, representing Delaware County from 1856 to 1857.

== Personal life ==
Cleaver married Jane Abraham, daughter of Enoch Abraham, in November 1832. They had four children, Sarah J., Eliza, Lydia and Isaac Abraham. His wife died in 1854. He married Sarina D. Jones, daughter of John Jones, on April 29, 1856. They had at least two children, Jonas Jones and Horace J. He lived on the "Cottage Home" farm up until his death. His son Isaac was a merchant and served in the Civil War.

Cleaver died on July 17, 1877, at his home in Easttown Township. He was buried in Great Valley Baptist Church Cemetery in Devon.

== Legacy ==
A railroad station of the Pennsylvania Railroad was named after Cleaver. It was built on his farm near Radnor Township and was renamed Wayne station after he sold the property in 1869.
