= Wayne, Pennsylvania =

Unincorporated community in Pennsylvania, US

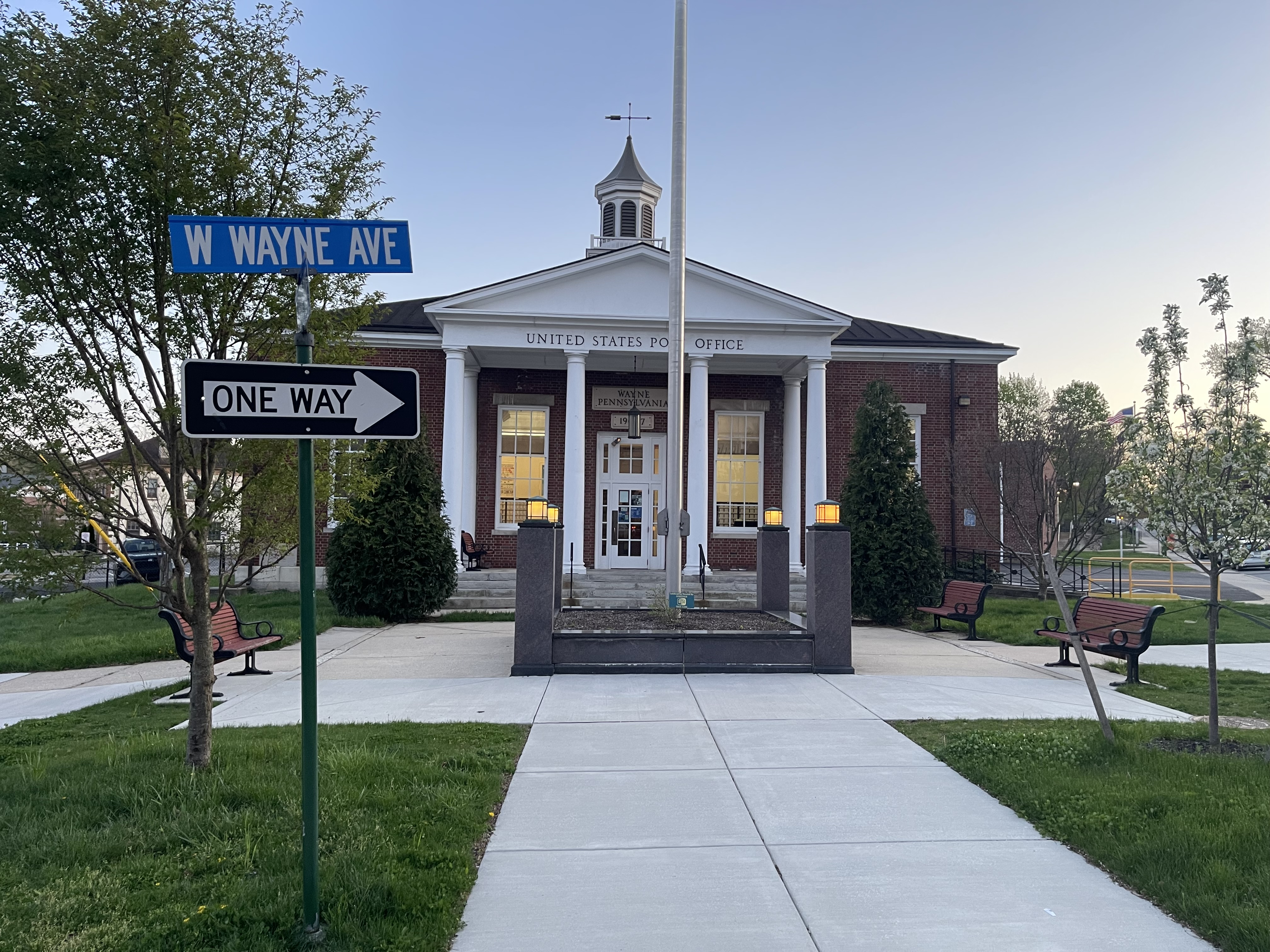
- Wayne post office

- Location of Wayne in Pennsylvania Wayne, Pennsylvania (the United States)
- Coordinates: 40°02′38″N 75°23′16″W
- Country: United States
- State: Pennsylvania
- Counties: Delaware, Montgomery, Chester
- Townships: Radnor
- Elevation: 384 ft (117 m)
- Time zone: UTC−5 (EST)
  - Summer (DST): UTC−4 (EDT)
- ZIP Codes: 19080, 19087–19089
- Area codes: 610 and 484

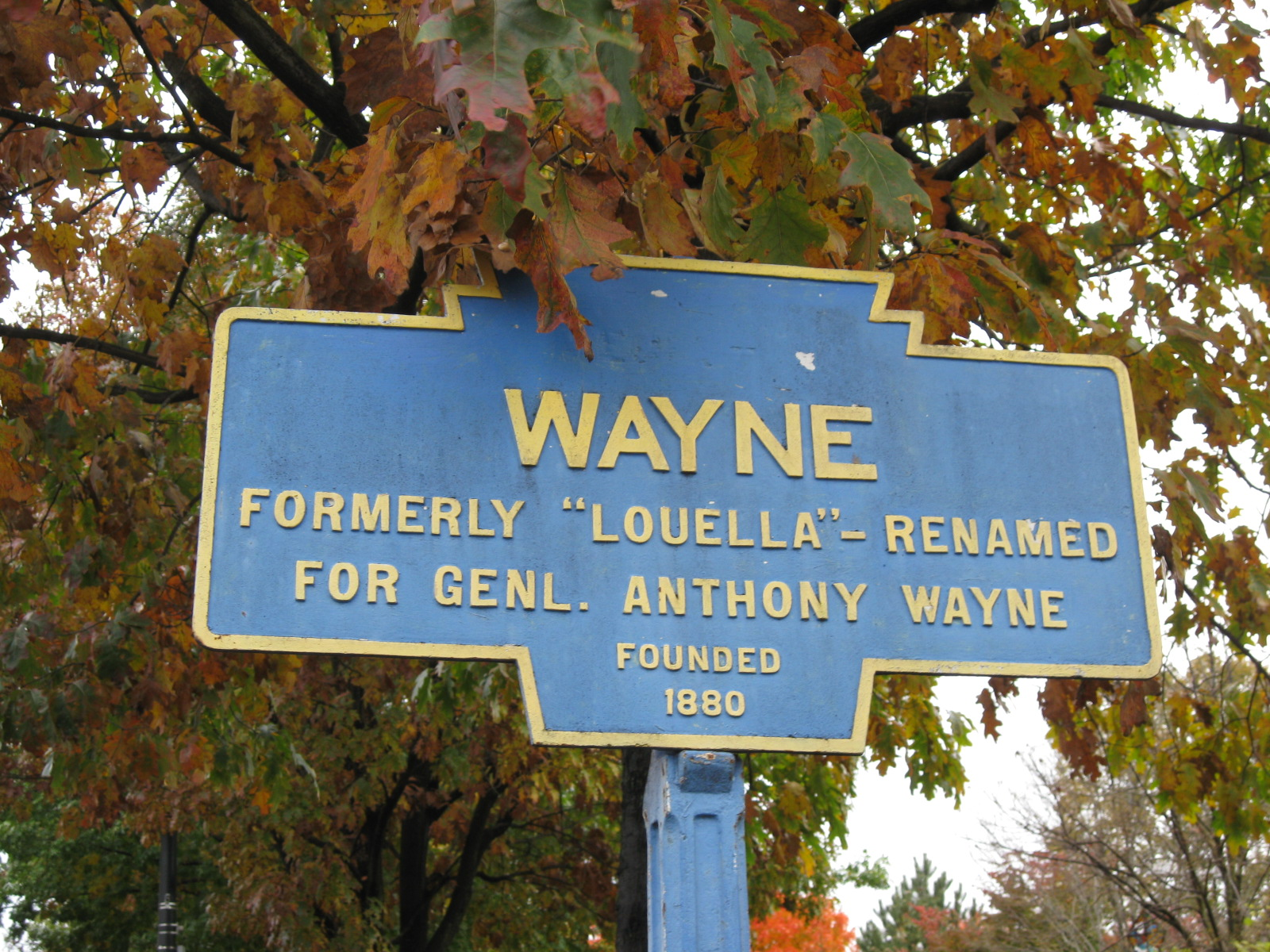
Keystone Marker for Wayne

Wayne is an unincorporated community centered in Delaware County, Pennsylvania, United States, on the Main Line, a series of highly affluent Philadelphia suburbs located along the railroad tracks of the Pennsylvania Railroad and one of the wealthiest areas in the nation. While the center of Wayne is in Radnor Township, Wayne extends into both Tredyffrin Township in Chester County and Upper Merion Township in Montgomery County. The center of Wayne was designated the Downtown Wayne Historic District in 2012. Considering the large area served by the Wayne post office, the community may extend slightly into Easttown Township, Chester County, as well.

The center of the Wayne business district is the intersection of Lancaster Avenue and Wayne Avenue, its main street. The historic Wayne station is located one block north of this intersection. The Wayne business district also includes a post office, a hotel, a library, the new Radnor Middle School, and several banks, stores, restaurants, cafes, bars and other commercial establishments. Other institutions and attractions in Wayne include the Wayne Hotel, Chanticleer Garden, and the Valley Forge Military College.

As of the 2020 U.S. census, there is a Wayne census-designated place, entirely in Radnor Township.

== History ==
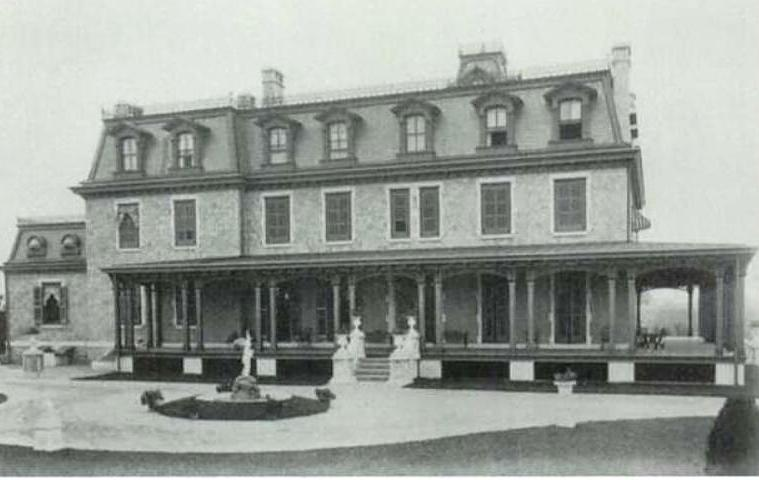
"Louella" home of J. Henry Askin, founder of Wayne

Wayne's development began when a railroad stop called Cleaver's Landing was established. It was renamed Wayne Station after General Anthony Wayne. Parcels in the area totaling 293 acres (1.19 km^{2}) were bought by banker J.H. Askin, where he built a mansion named "Louella" after his daughters Louisa and Ella. "Louella" was described as an 80-room stone building with a large porch overlooking manicured lawn. His and surrounding land were bought in 1880 by banker A.J. Drexel and newspaper editor G.W. Childs, to form a larger development they called Wayne Estate. More homes and a hotel were then built. In a brochure from 1887 about their development they noted they had provided Wayne with "water, light and drainage—the three great conveniences of a large city—by the most approved modern methods." They described Wayne Estate as follows:

The suburban village known as Wayne, on the Pennsylvania Railroad, fourteen miles from Philadelphia, differs so much from the ordinary town allowed to grow up hap-hazard and to develop conveniences as population increases, that it is necessary, in describing it as it appears, to keep in mind some facts about its history. Wayne is not an accidental aggregation of cottages; it is a town built by design, and provided at the start with all the conveniences to which residents of cities are accustomed and which they are so apt to miss and long for when they go into the country or even into the suburbs of a great city. The scheme of the town was well thought out and planned before any of the new cottages were built, and, as it was undertaken by liberal gentlemen of abundant means, no expense was spared in the preliminary municipal work.

The Chanticleer Garden, Downtown Wayne Historic District, North Wayne Historic District, Pennsylvania Railroad Station at Wayne, South Wayne Historic District and Wayne Hotel are all located on the National Register of Historic Places.

== Geography ==
Wayne is located on the Main Line (the Paoli/Thorndale Line on SEPTA Regional Rail). The central business district of Wayne is located at the intersection of Lancaster and Wayne Avenues in Radnor Township, Pennsylvania. The area served by the Wayne ZIP code (19087) is large and encompasses areas both in Radnor Township, Delaware County and in the neighboring adjacent municipalities of Upper Merion in Montgomery County and Tredyffrin in Chester County, including the communities of Radnor, Strafford, St. Davids, and Chesterbrook.

== Transportation ==
St. Davids station, Wayne station, and Strafford station on the Paoli/Thorndale SEPTA Line are in Wayne.

== Demographics ==
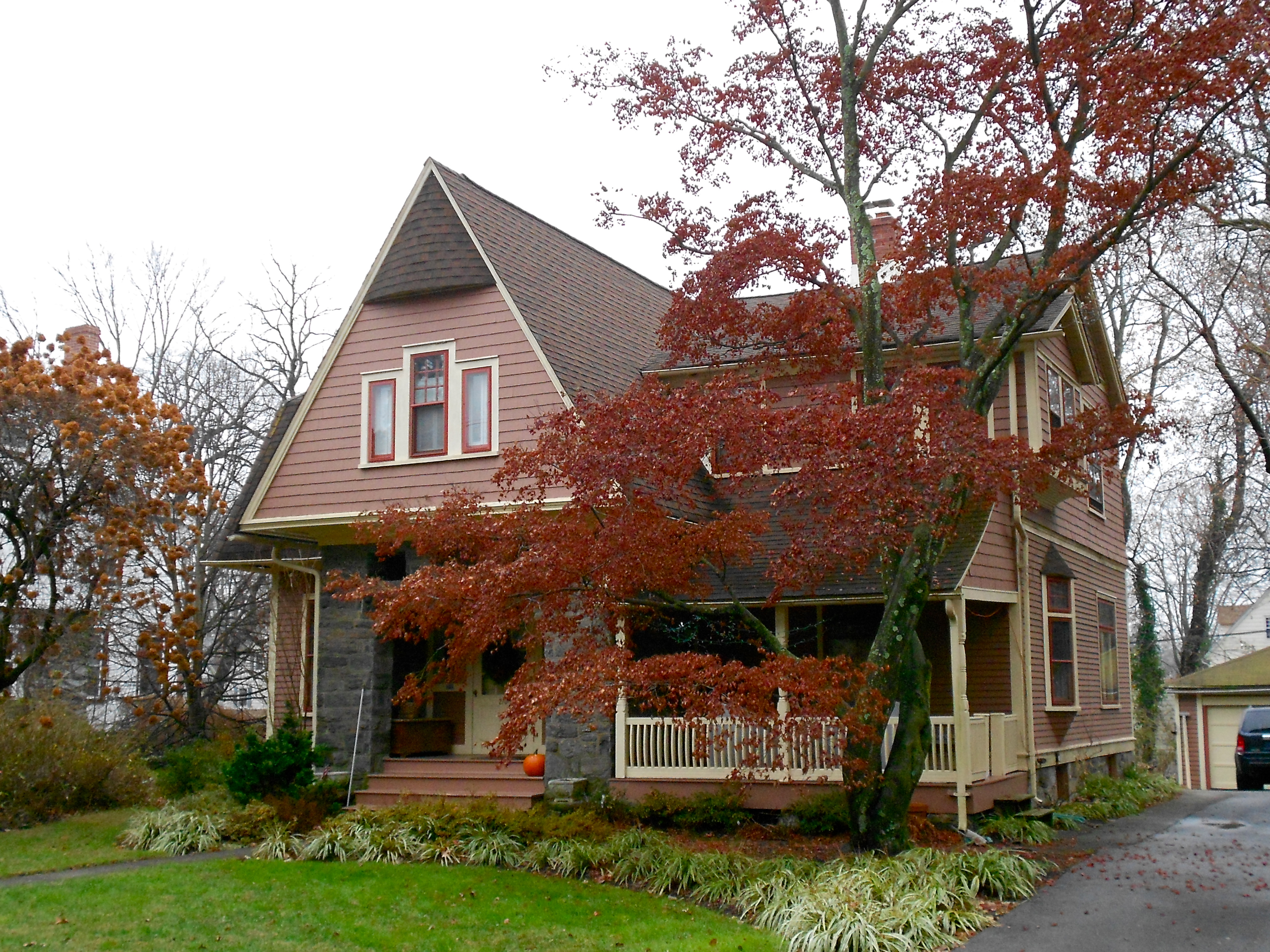
House in the North Wayne Historic District

Since, prior to 2020 Wayne is neither an incorporated area nor a census-designated place, all the data was for the ZIP code 19087. As of the census of 2020, there were 33,501 people and 12,987 households residing in the community. The median age was 39.6. The racial makeup of the community was 85.5% White, 7.9% Asian and 5.3% African American, while 3.7% of the population was Hispanic or Latino of any race. The median income for a household in the community was $161,554, and 3.3% of the population was below the poverty line.

== Economy ==
Teleflex, Kenexa, and DLL Group (U.S.) are based in Wayne.

== Education ==
=== Elementary and high school ===
==== Public schools ====
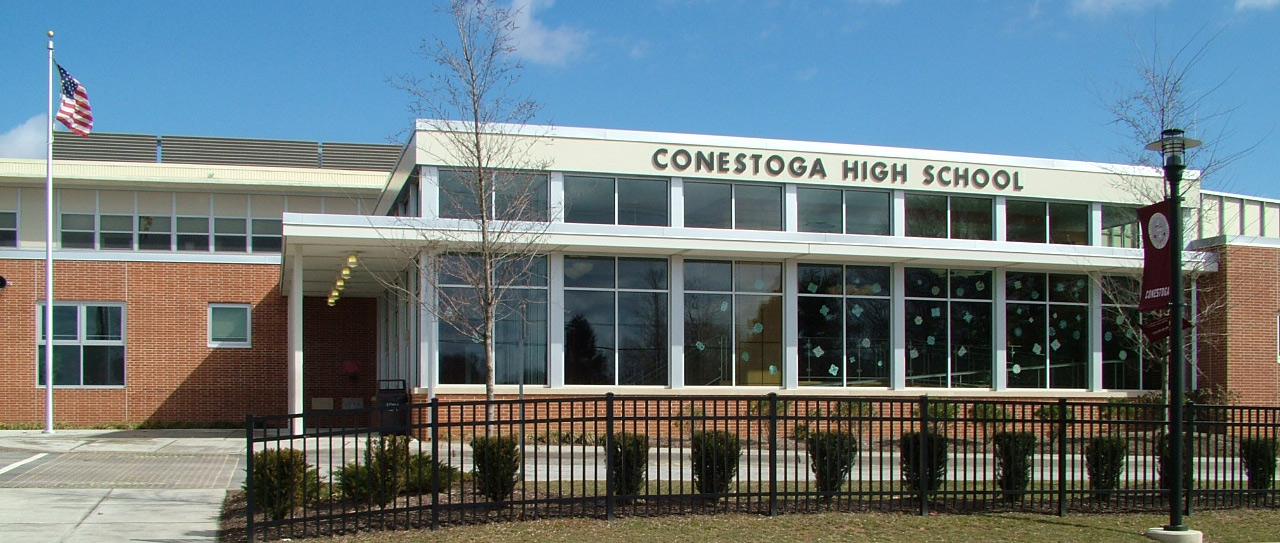
Conestoga High School

The Majority of Residents who reside in Wayne, PA live within Radnor Township and attend schools in Radnor Township School District. Radnor High School is located roughly a mile down the road from downtown Wayne. Radnor Middle School as well as the Radnor School District HQ is located in the heart of downtown Wayne and Wayne on Friday afternoons is lively with students shopping, getting ice cream or more. The majority of Radnor residents attend Wayne Elementary School though some do attend Radnor Elementary. Other area pupils who live in the Tredyffrin portion attend schools in Tredyffrin/Easttown School District. Those in the northeastern portion of the community in Upper Merion Township attend the Upper Merion Area School District.

Students in Radnor Township attend Radnor High School. Students in Tredyffrin Township attend Conestoga High School. Students in Upper Merion Township attend Upper Merion Area High School.

==== Catholic schools ====
The St. Katharine of Siena School is a Catholic K-8 grade school located in downtown Wayne operated by the Archdiocese of Philadelphia. Catholic students who live in Radnor Township as well as other towns in the Delaware Valley may choose to attend Archbishop John Carroll High School, located in the nearby community of Radnor.

==== Private schools ====
Many private schools are also located nearby including the Quaker-affiliated Shipley School in Bryn Mawr, all-boys Haverford School in Haverford and all-girls Agnes Irwin School in Rosemont, all located east of Wayne. Another private school, Episcopal Academy, moved from their location close to Philadelphia to Newtown Square. Other local popular private schools include Malvern Prep, Devon Prep, Notre Dame, Villa Maria, Jack Barrack Hebrew Academy, St Aloysius, Sacred Heart, Friends Central. Benchmark, AIM Academy, Delaware Valley Friends School and Woodlyne specialize students with learning disabilities.

The Valley Forge Military College is also located in Wayne.

=== Post-secondary ===
Nearby post-secondary institutions include Villanova University and Eastern University. Other colleges in the area include Bryn Mawr College, Haverford College, and Harcum College,

== Notable people ==
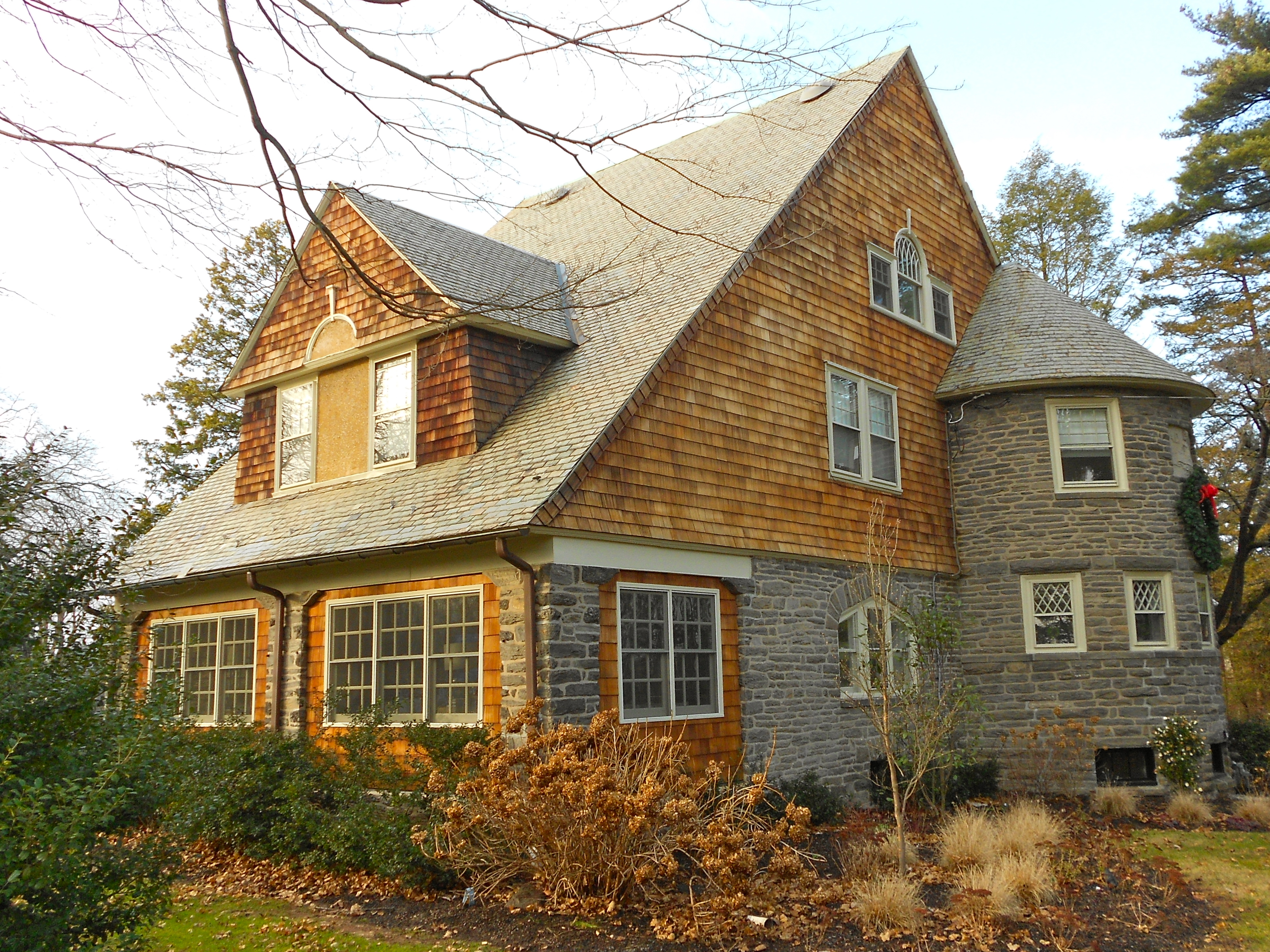
House in the South Wayne Historic District

- Eric Bazilian, musician
- Diane Meredith Belcher, concert organist, teacher, church musician
- Helen Burwell Chapin (1892–1950), art historian, translator, poet
- Hiram Cleaver (1801–1877), member of the Pennsylvania House of Representatives
- Robert Elmore, organist, composer, teacher
- Matt Freese (born 1998), soccer player
- William Gilmore, Olympic rower
- Mark Herzlich, football player
- P.T. Ricci, lacrosse player
- Kasie Hunt, journalist
- Abbi Jacobson, comedian, writer, actress, illustrator and producer
- Karl Kirchwey, poet
- Lauv, musician
- Daylin Leach, state senator for the 17th district
- Ned Martin, sportscaster
- Anna Moffo, opera singer
- Lisa Raymond, tennis player
- Rafael Robb, economist
- Christina Sharpe, African-American academic and professor
- Jerry Spinelli, author
- Larri Thomas, actress and dancer
- Thomas F. Wilson, actor
- Harold Wright, clarinetist
- Joshua Wurman, scientist

== Points of interest ==
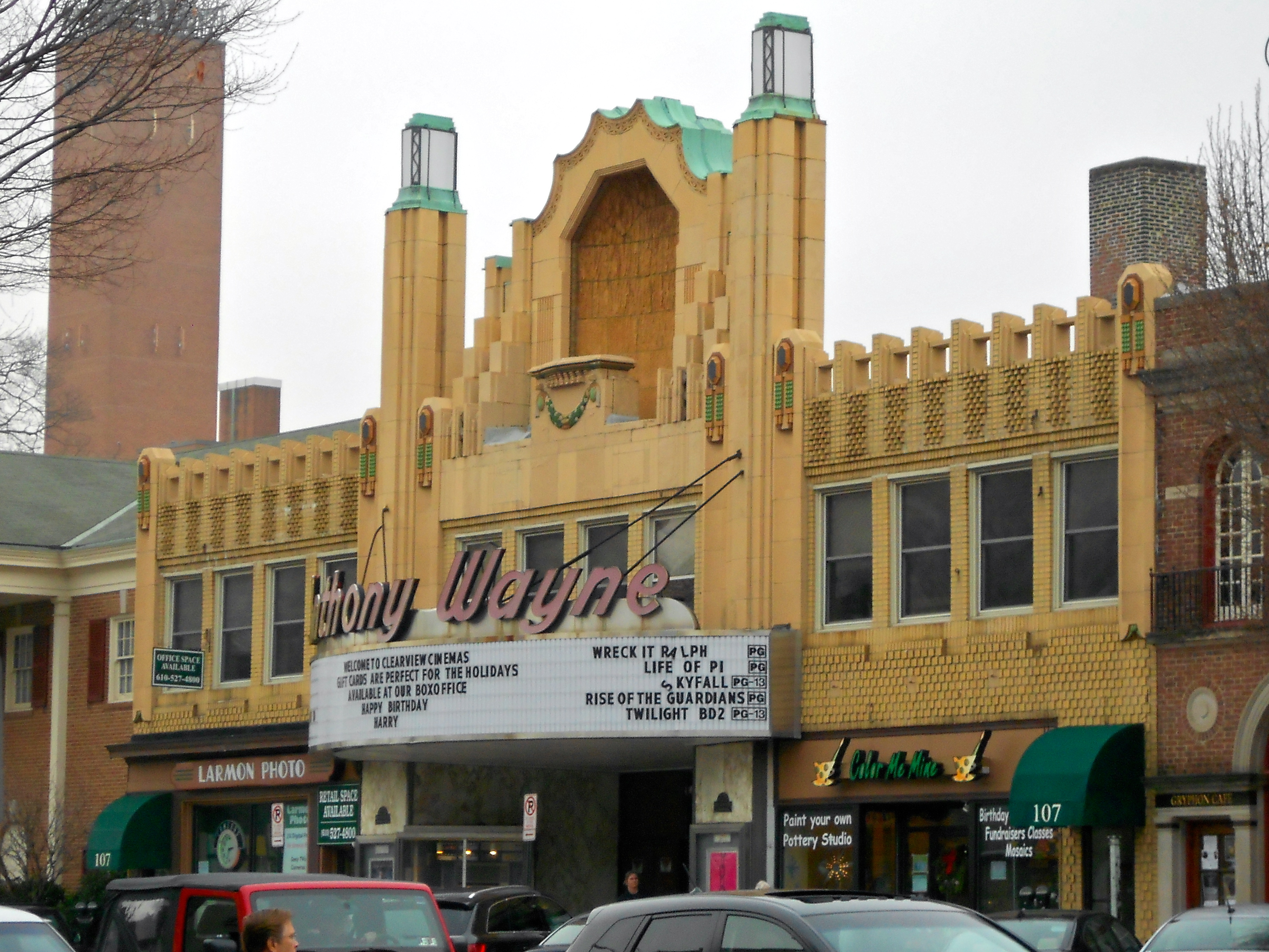
Anthony Wayne Theatre

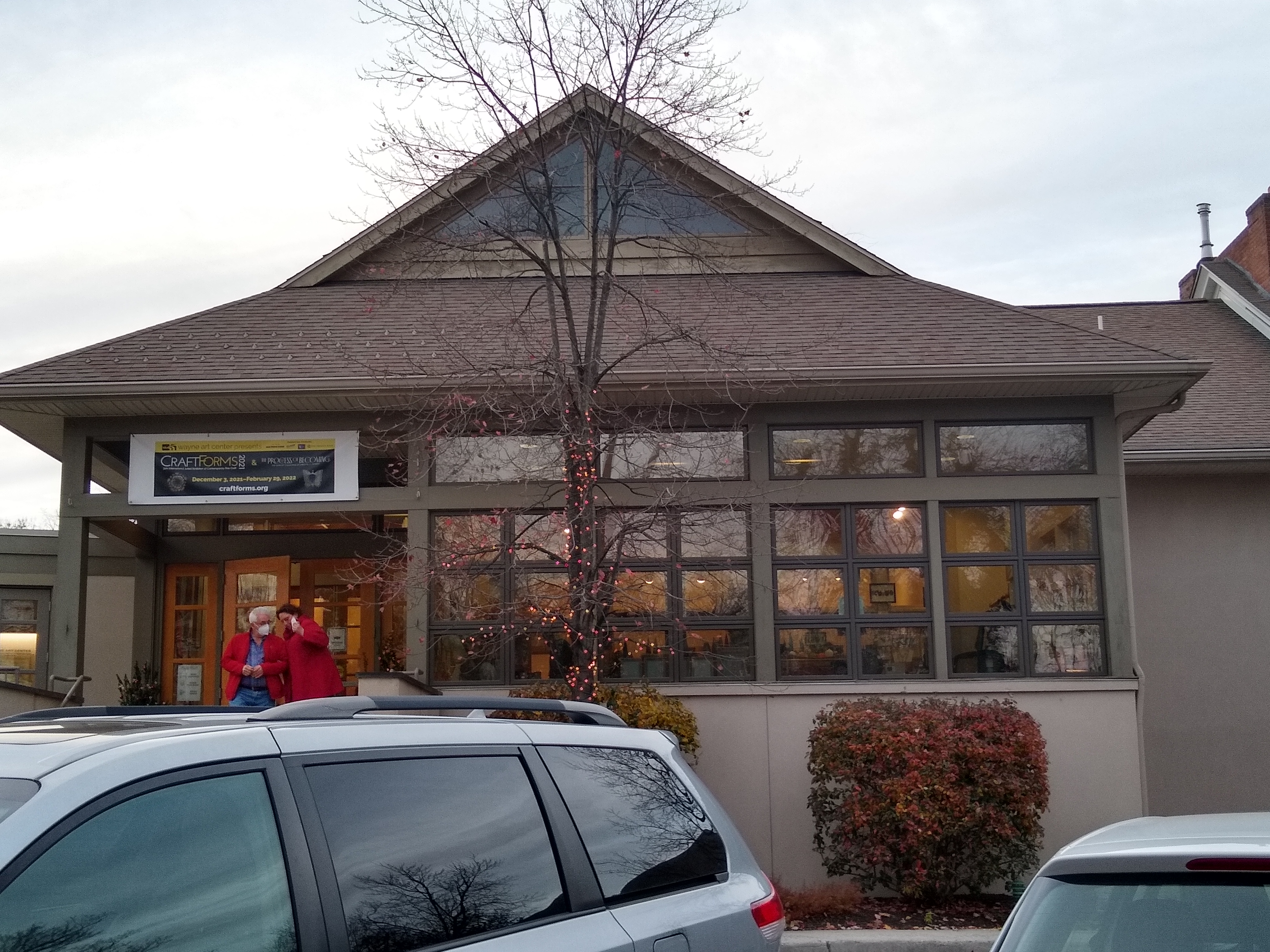
Wayne Art Center

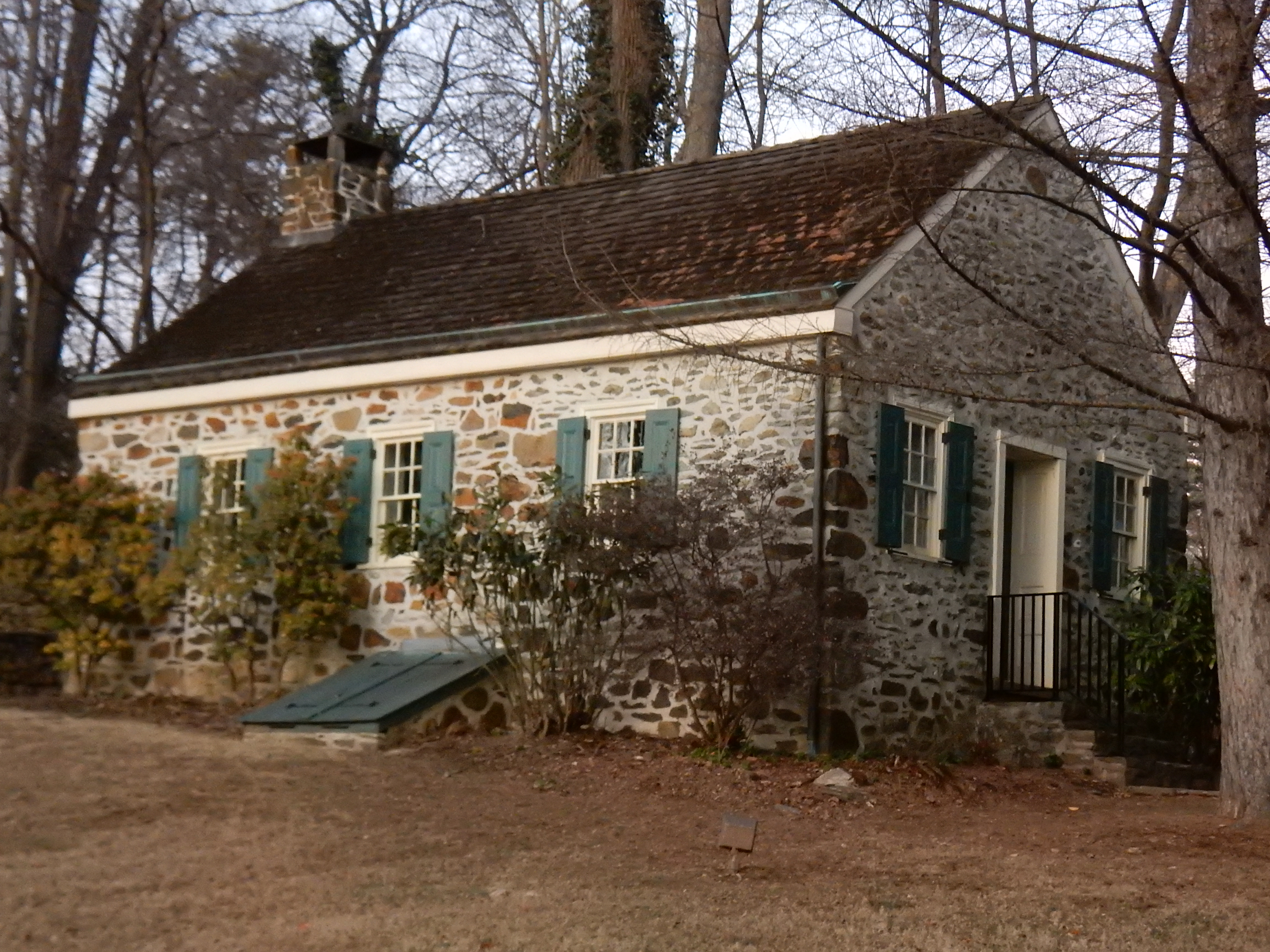
Old Eagle School

- Chanticleer Garden
- St. Davids Church
- Wayne Hotel
- Radnor Trail System
- Anthony Wayne Theater - art deco-style movie theater
- Eagle Village Shops
- Farmer's Market
- Downtown Wayne
- Ardrossan Estate
- Old Eagle School
- Wayne Art Center, established in 1931
- The Finley House
