= Ganesha in Buddhism =

Vināyaka (Gaṇapati)
- God of obstacles, bliss, protection, wealth, and success
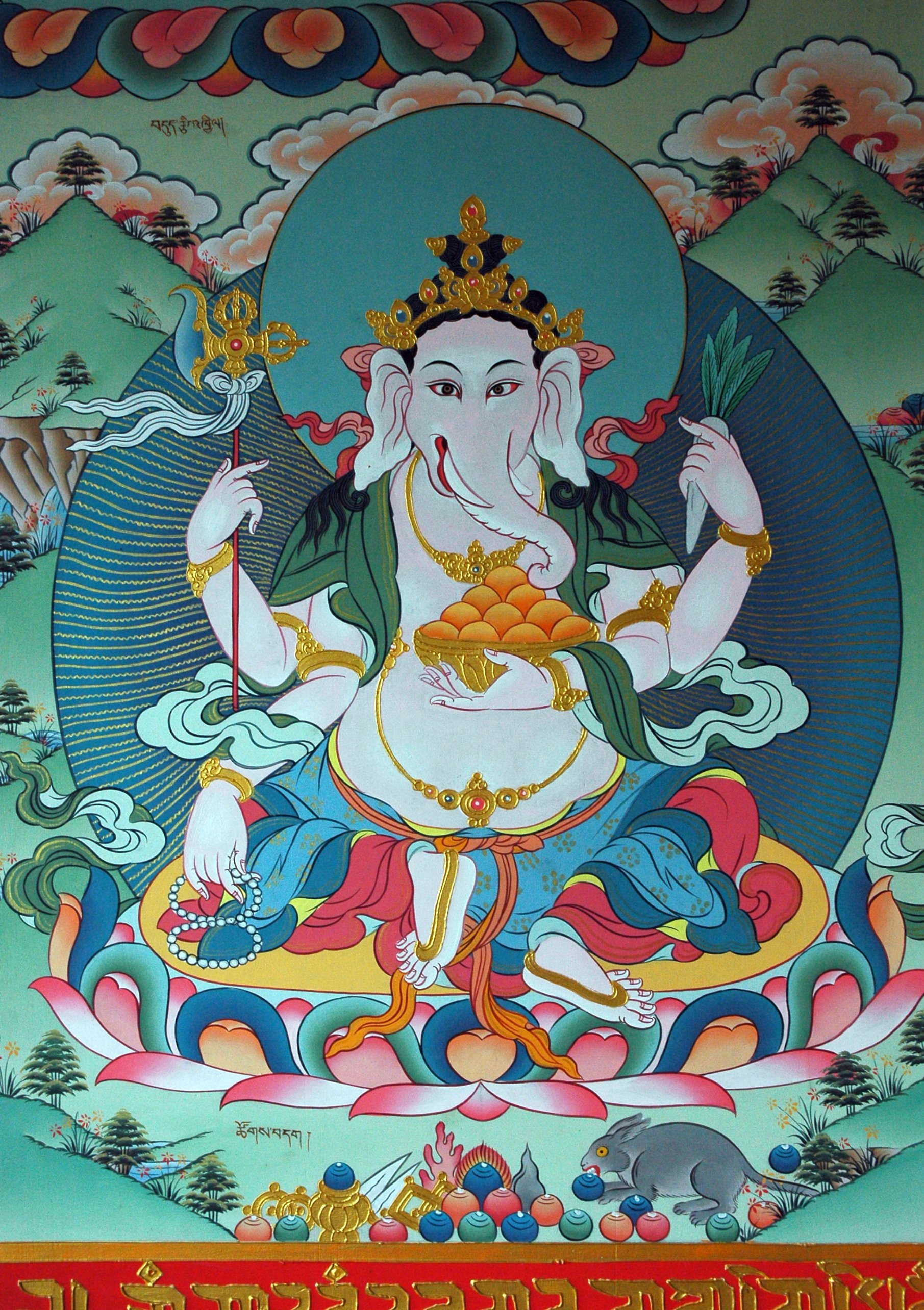
- Vinayaka painting from Nepal
- Affiliation: Deva; Vairochana Buddha; Eleven-Headed Avalokiteshvara; Amritakundalin; Sanbō Kōjin
- Weapon: axe, trident
- Gender: Male

Genealogy
- Parents: Maheshvara (father); Uma (mother)

Equivalents
- Hindu: Ganesha

Vināyaka (IAST; Jp. Binayaka, 毘那夜迦), Vighnāntaka, or Gaṇapati (Jp: Ganabachi, 誐那鉢底; Tibetan: tshogs bdag) is a Buddhist deity venerated in various traditions of Mahayana Buddhism. He is the Buddhist equivalent of the Hindu god Ganesha. In Tibetan Buddhism he is also known as the Red Lord of Hosts (Tibetan: tsog gi dag po, mar po). In Japanese Buddhism he is also known as Kangiten (Japanese: 歓喜天, "god of bliss"; Sanskrit (IAST): Nandikeśvara) or Shōten (聖天, lit. "sacred god" or "noble god").

The Buddhist Vināyaka is considered a protector from evil, a remover of obstacles (physical and mental) especially invoked at the beginning of an undertaking, a general benefactor, wealth deity, and a deity of joy and pleasure. Although Vināyaka and the Hindu Ganesha share a common origin and a number of traits, there are also some marked differences between the two. For example, the Buddhist deity is commonly understood to be an emanation of the bodhisattva Avalokiteshvara (Guanyin) or of the Buddha Vairocana.

Vināyaka is depicted in numerous forms depending on the tradition. In Indo-Tibetan Buddhism he is depicted with a big belly and may be white, red or yellow, and have four or more arms that carry various weapons and implements. He is often accompanied by a rat. In Japan, a popular depiction is a male-female couple (both with elephant heads) standing in an embrace in an iconographic depiction known as the "Dual Kangiten" (双身歓喜天, Sōshin Kangiten) or the "Embracing Kangiten."

Ganesh is also a popular deity in Thailand, revered by Thai Buddhists and Thai Hindus alike.

== In East Asian Buddhism ==
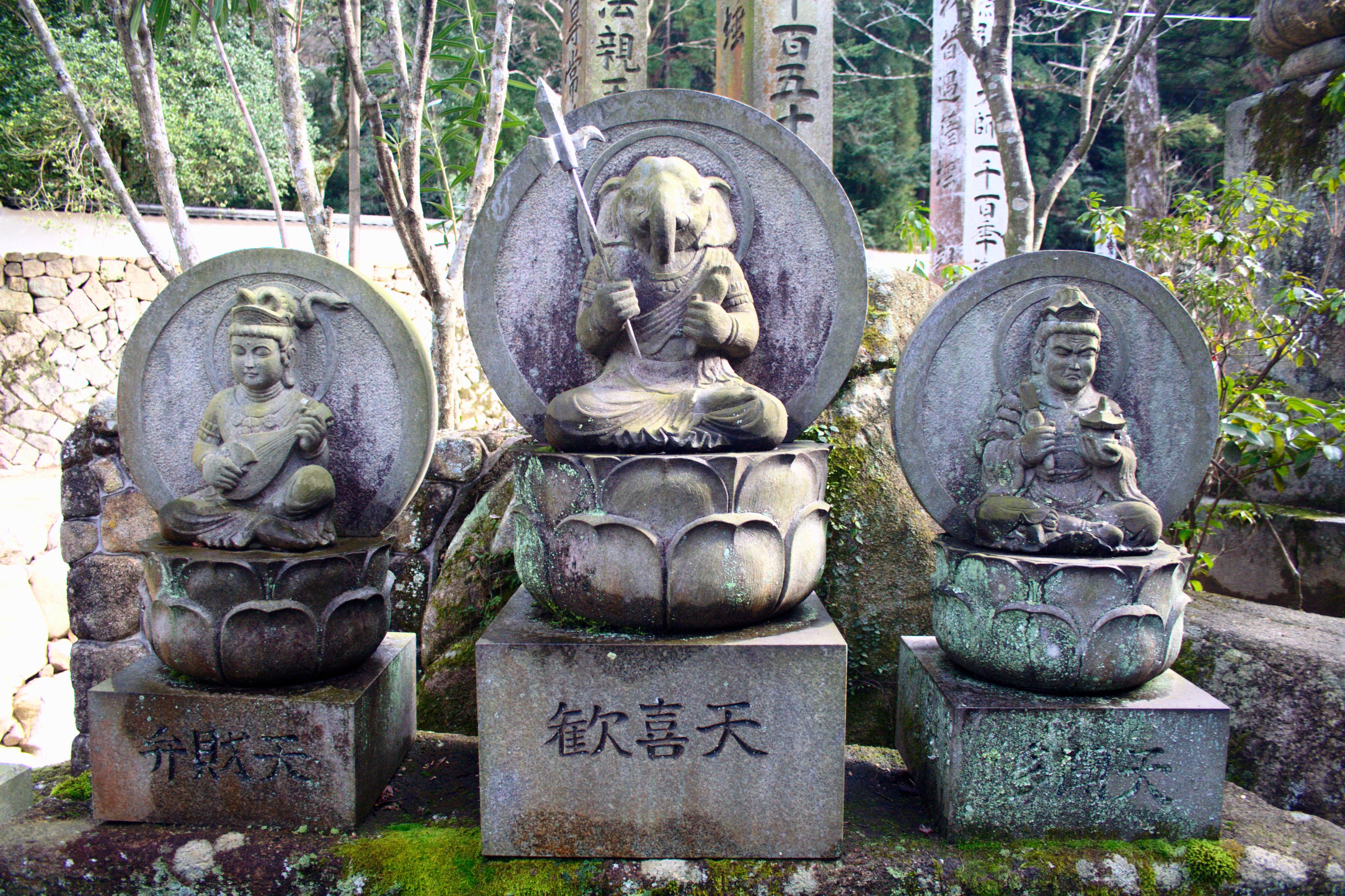
Benzaiten (left), Kangiten (center) and Tamonten (right) in Daishō-in temple (Itsukushima, Hiroshima Prefecture)

Ganesha's emergence in the historical record is linked to the vināyakas, a group of troublesome demons in Hindu texts which were known to create obstacles for Buddhist practitioners. In the earliest Buddhist literature which mentions these figures, vināyakas (and their king, Vināyaka, i.e. Ganesh - Ganapati) are portrayed negatively as obstructive deities that create obstacles, and thus they often require ritual practices to either expel or appease.

Vināyaka images begin appear in Indian Buddhist sculptures during the late Gupta period (c. 3rd century CE – 575 CE). Vināyaka is also depicted in a wall painting in Mogao Cave 285 in Dunhuang as a protector of Buddhism with the gods Maheshvara (Shiva) and Skanda.

After the development of Chinese Esoteric Buddhism, Vināyaka acquires a more positive role as a subjugator of demons. Various Chinese esoteric sources contain rituals invoking Vināyaka as a protector against obstacle causing demons. Some East Asian esoteric sources contain a "Dual-bodied Kangiten", which is depicted as an embracing male-female couple. The origins of this unique imagery remain unclear.

The introduction of Vināyaka to Japan was facilitated by the Shingon founder Kūkai (774–835) and the deity was quickly assimilated into Japanese Buddhism, initially as a minor guardian called Kangiten or Shōten in Japanese. Over time, Vināyaka evolved into an important deity with a dedicated cult focused on subjugation rites, notably during the Heian period.

The medieval period onwards reveals the integration of Kangiten into official state-sponsored rites in Japan, showcasing his invocation in various contexts, including subjugation rituals against political opponents. Historical figures, such as warlords and merchants, were often devotees of Vinayaka, attributing their success to the deity. Famous samurai warlords like Toyotomi Hideyoshi and Tokugawa Ieyasu were known to propitiate Kangiten. Vinayaka's worship spread further during the Edo period, though caution was required in performing rituals without the guidance of qualified priests. In Japanese Buddhism, he is often seen as an emanation of Vairochana Buddha meant as a last resort for those who have no other hope.

== In Vajrayana and Himalayan Buddhist traditions ==
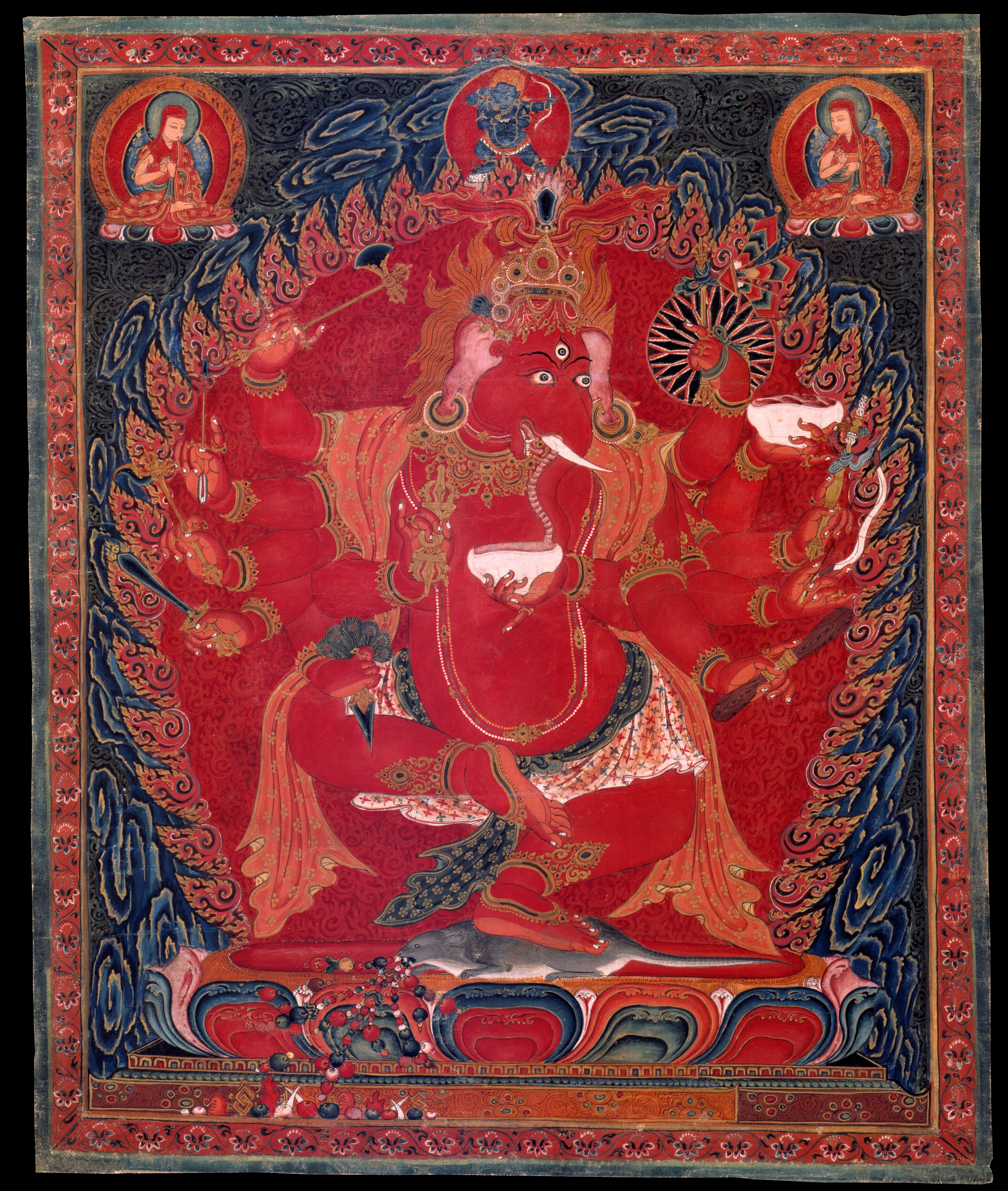
Tibetan Red Dancing Ganapati, 15th century

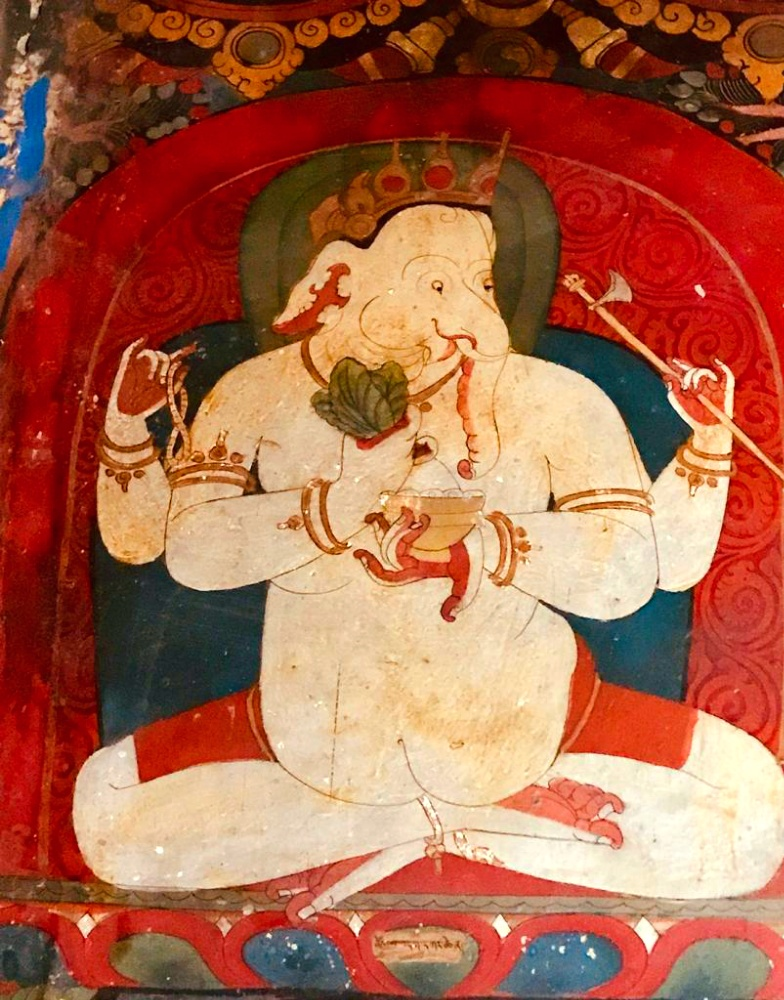
White Ganapati, Tibet

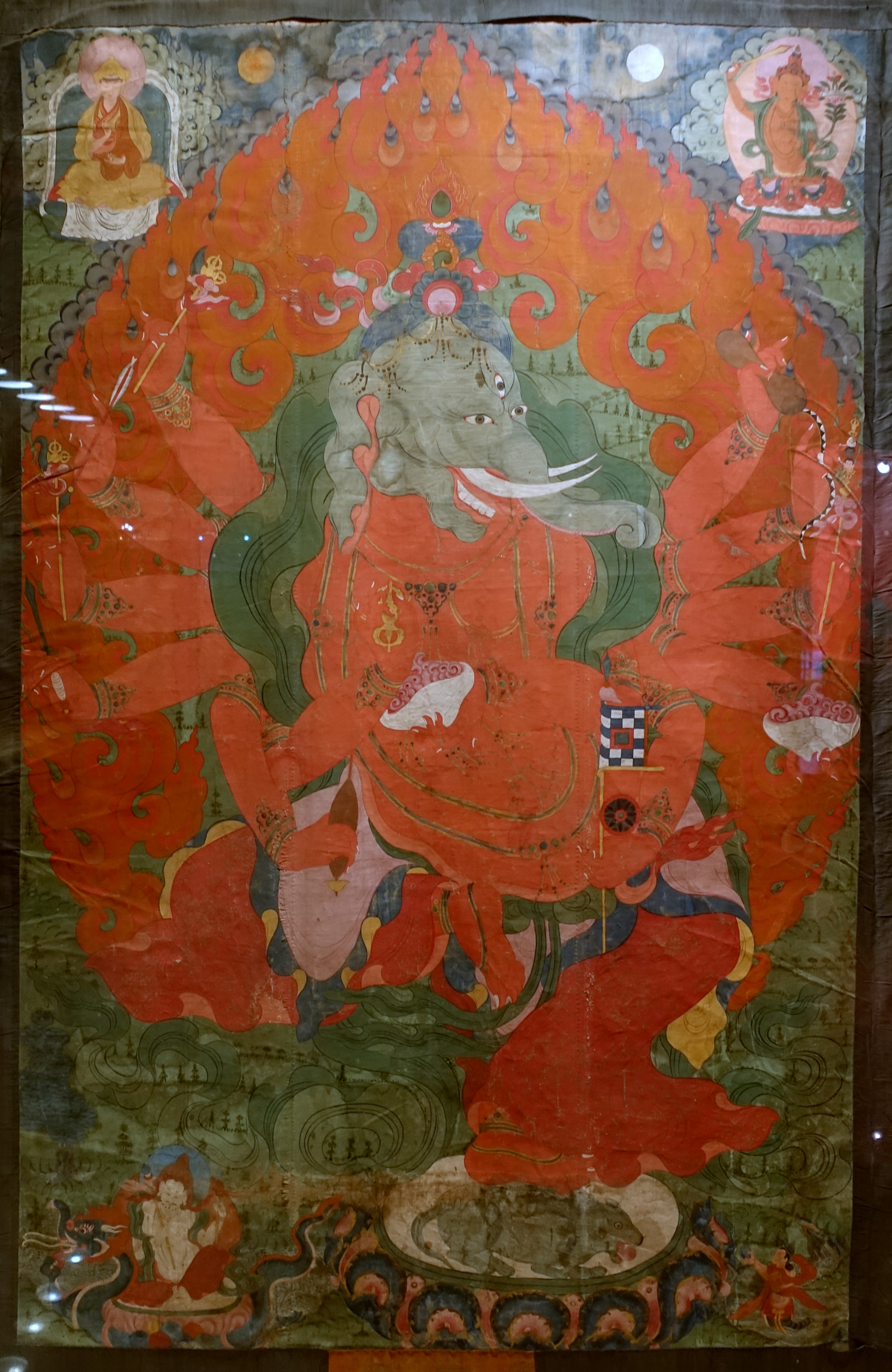
Tibetan style Ganapati thangka, Chengdu, China

=== History ===
The emergence of Esoteric (Tantric) Buddhism and its spread to Nepal, Tibet and the Himalayan regions saw the growth of Vināyaka / Ganapati as an important protector deity (dharmapala) and subjugator of demons. In Tibet, the deity was worshiped for the removal of obstacles, granting of wealth and was at times portrayed as a wrathful, multi-armed deity wielding weapons. A Nepalese text provides a list of spells invoking Ganapati to not only bestow wealth but also to cause harm to enemies. He is often shown dancing. This form, called Nṛtta Ganapati, was popular in northern India, later adopted in Nepal, and then in Tibet.

In Newar Buddhism, Ganapati is also a benefactor and a protector deity. In Nepal, the Hindu form of Ganesha, known as Heramba, is popular; he has five heads and rides a lion.

Ganapati (Tibetan: tshogs bdag) is retained as a deity in the Indo-Tibetan Buddhist pantheon. He is seen as a destroyer of obstacles, demons, and as a wealth deity, and he is also sometimes shown in the dancing tantric form.

There are thirty texts contained in the Tibetan Buddhist canon which deal with Ganesha. In these texts, which are Indian texts preserved in Tibetan translation, Ganapati is depicted as a wealth deity which can also grant worldly pleasures like sex and food. He is also depicted as a protector from negative forces, demons, and sickness. In these tantric Buddhist sources, Ganesha is generally presented as an emanation of the Bodhisattva Avalokitesvara.

Several of these texts, including the longest one, the Mahaganapati Tantra, were brought to Tibet by the tantric master Atisha. Another text, the Ganapatihrdaya provides a mantra based method which can be used to transform non-buddhist ceremonies into Buddhist ones. In one of these texts, a practice text (sadhana) called Vinayaka Raja Sadhanam, Ganapati's short recitation mantra is given as: Om Ah Gah Hum Svaha, and a longer mantra is given as: Om Gam Ganapati Mama Ratna Siddhi Ga Ga Ga Ga Ga Ga Ga Ga Ganapati svaha.

Vinayaka is also known as Maha Rakta, the great Red Lord of Ganas. He is one of the three great Red Deities of the Sakya school ('mar chen kor sum') included in a larger set called 'The Thirteen Golden Dharmas' of Sakya. The other two deities are Kurukulle and Takkiraja.

In the Nyingma school, there are also many termas (revealed treasure texts) which focus on Ganapati. He generally remains an emanation of Avalokiteshvara and it associated with power, and the ability to increase and magnetize forces and activities.

=== Iconography ===
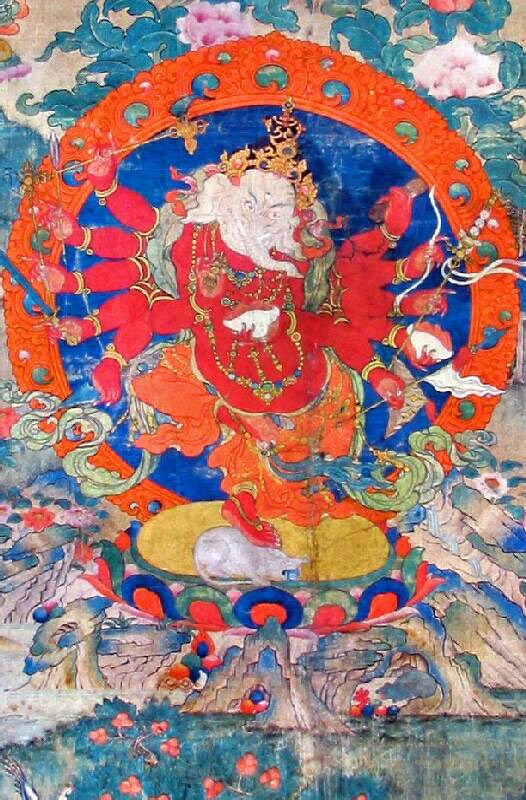
Ganapati, Maha Rakta

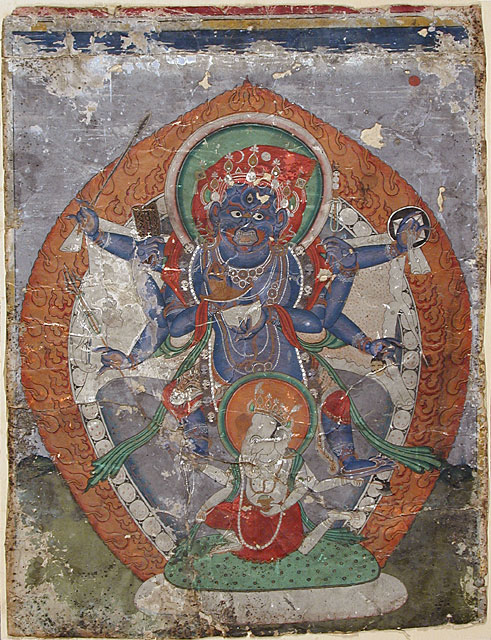
Vignantaka on top of Vinayaka

There are numerous forms and styles of Vinayaka / Ganapati in Tibetan Buddhism. Depending on the tradition, he may be depicted as white, red, or yellow, with four or more arms, and with several different implements, weapons and companion figures (like a rat, which he often mounts).

One iconographic depiction from the Sakya school describes Ganapati as follows:

...beside a lapis lazuli rock mountain is a red lotus with eight petals, in the middle a blue rat expelling various jewels, [above] Shri Ganapati with a body red in colour, having an elephant face with sharp white tusks and possessing three eyes, black hair tied in a topknot with a wishing-gem and a red silk ribbon [all] in a bundle on the crown of the head. With twelve hands, the six right hold an axe, arrow, hook, vajra, sword and spear. The six left [hold] a pestle, bow, khatvanga, skullcup filled with blood, skullcup filled with human flesh and a shield together with a spear and banner. The peaceful right and left hands are signified by the vajra and skullcup filled with blood held to the heart. The remaining hands are displayed in a threatening manner. Wearing various silks as a lower garment and adorned with a variety of jewel ornaments, the left foot is extended in a dancing manner, standing in the middle of the bright rays of red flickering light. (Ngorchen Konchog Lhundrup, 1497–1557).

This form of Ganapati belongs to a set of three powerful deities known as the Three Great Red Deities (mar chen kor sum) of the Sakya school.

In other depictions, Ganapati is a subdued deity. In depictions of the six-armed protector Mahakala (Skt: Shad-bhuja Mahakala, Wylie: mGon po phyag drug pa), an elephant-headed figure usually addressed as Vinayaka is seen being trampled by the Dharma Protector, but he does not appear distressed. In Vajrayana and other related Buddhist arts, he is sometimes depicted as a subdued god trampled by Buddhist deities like Aparajita, Parnasabari and Vignataka.

== In Southeast Asian Buddhist countries ==
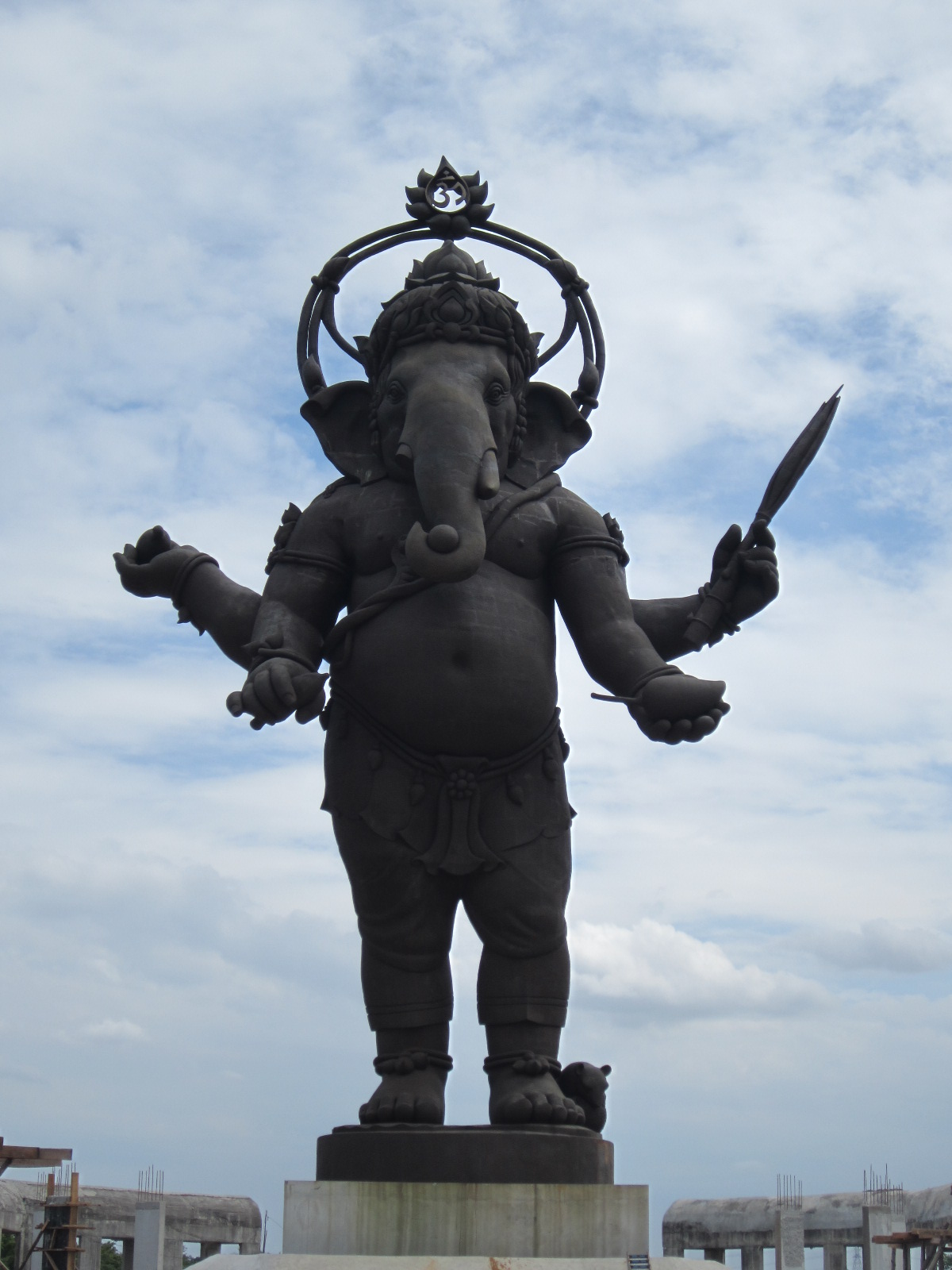
Bronze Ganesh, Khlong Khuean district, Thailand

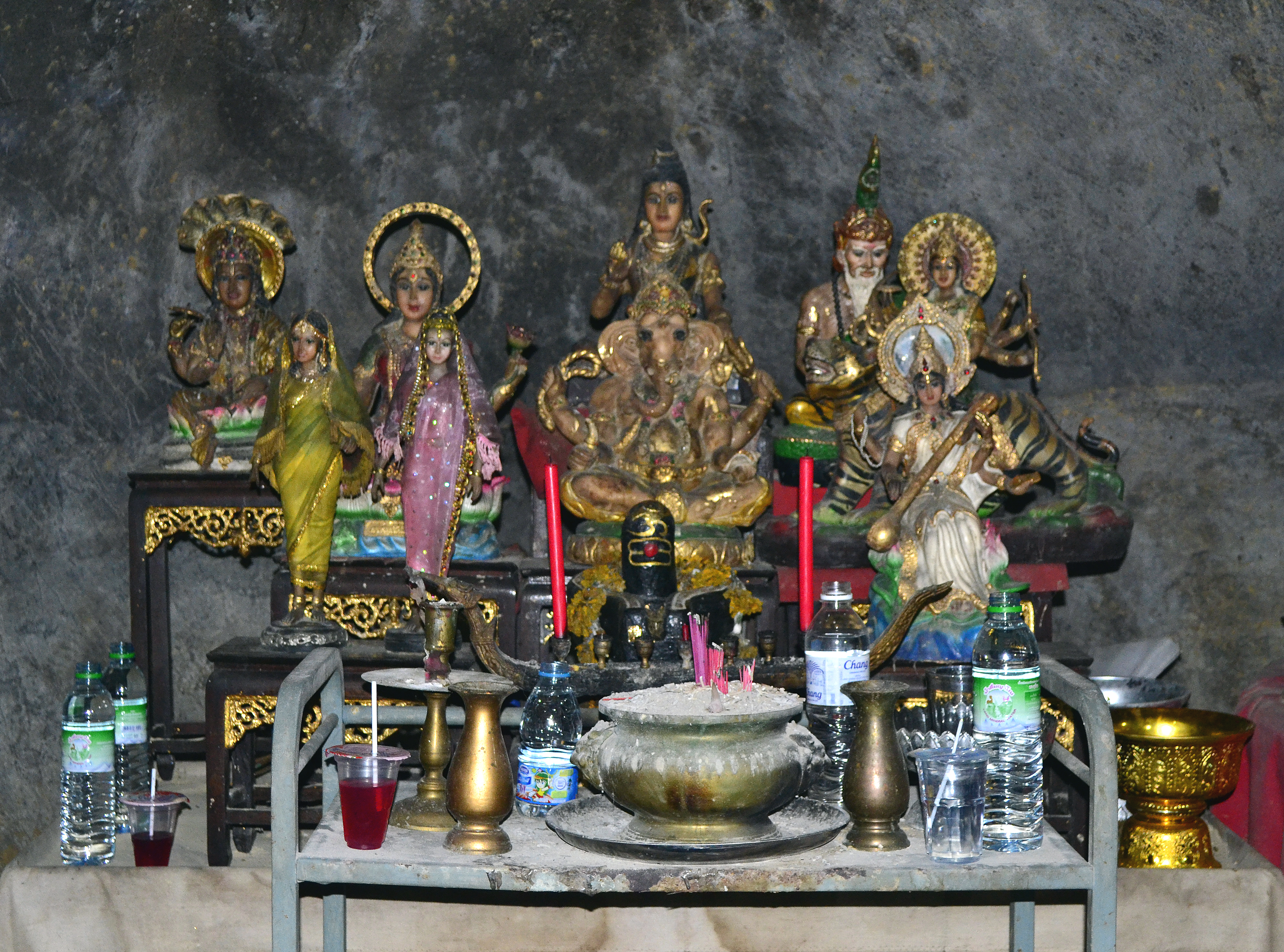
Ganesha and other Indian deities at Wat Tham Nakarat, Thailand

Ganesha is found throughout Buddhist Southeast Asia. Ganesh is often venerated not just by the minority Hindu populations of these nations, but also by Theravada Buddhists, who see him as a guardian deity, a wealth deity and a remover of obstacles. Thus, according to Brooke Schedneck,

Evidence of Ganesha statues begins in fifth-century C.E. Cambodia. Today, commercial buildings, especially large shopping complexes, contain elaborate shrines to Ganesha. Ganesha statues are prominent and popular in some Buddhist temples, such as Chiang Mai's silver temple, Wat Srisuphan. Theravada Buddhists may possess Ganesha statues displayed on altars below Buddha images in their homes and businesses. Practitioners turn to Ganesha as they do any other powerful figure-for safety and protection, a particular wish to obtain one's desires, or general help with wealth, health and prosperity.

In Myanmar, Ganesh is known as Maha Peinne (great bliss), derived from Mahāviāyaka, and is generally considered a guardian deity. The worship of Mahāpeinne Nat started around the early Second Ava Period. Konbaung king Mindon Min recognized the Mahapeinne Nat (Ganesh) alongside Thurathati (Sarasvati), Sandi (Dewi), Paramithwa (Siva), and Beithano (Visnu) as Natkyi (နတ်ကြီး) or greater Nat.

Ganesha (Phra Phikanet, พระพิฆเนศ, or Phra Phikanesuan, พระพิฆเนศวร) is an important deity in Thailand, where he is seen as a god of the arts and success and remover of obstacles. Ganesh worship was promoted by King Vajiravudh (c. 1910-1925) who was devoted to Ganesha personally and built a Ganesha shrine at his personal Sanam Chandra Palace in Nakhon Pathom. His personal belief regarding Ganesha as the god of arts formally became prominent following the establishment of the Fine Arts Department of the government, which has Ganesha on its seal. Today, Ganesha is depicted both in the seal of the Fine Arts Department, and Thailand's first prominent fine arts academy; the Silpakorn University.
