= Radnor Township, Pennsylvania =

Township in Pennsylvania, US

Radnor Township
- Township with home rule
- Township of Radnor
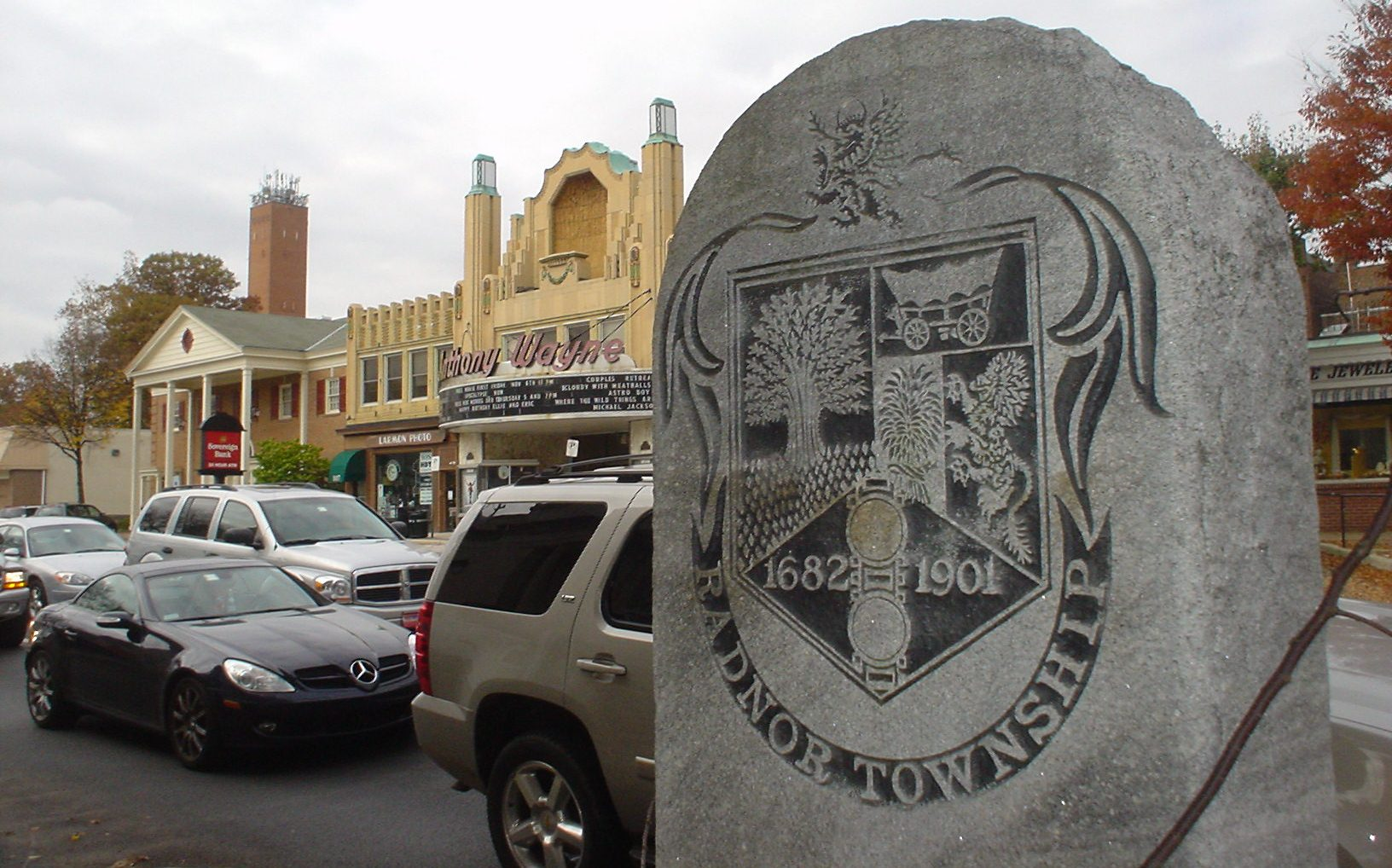
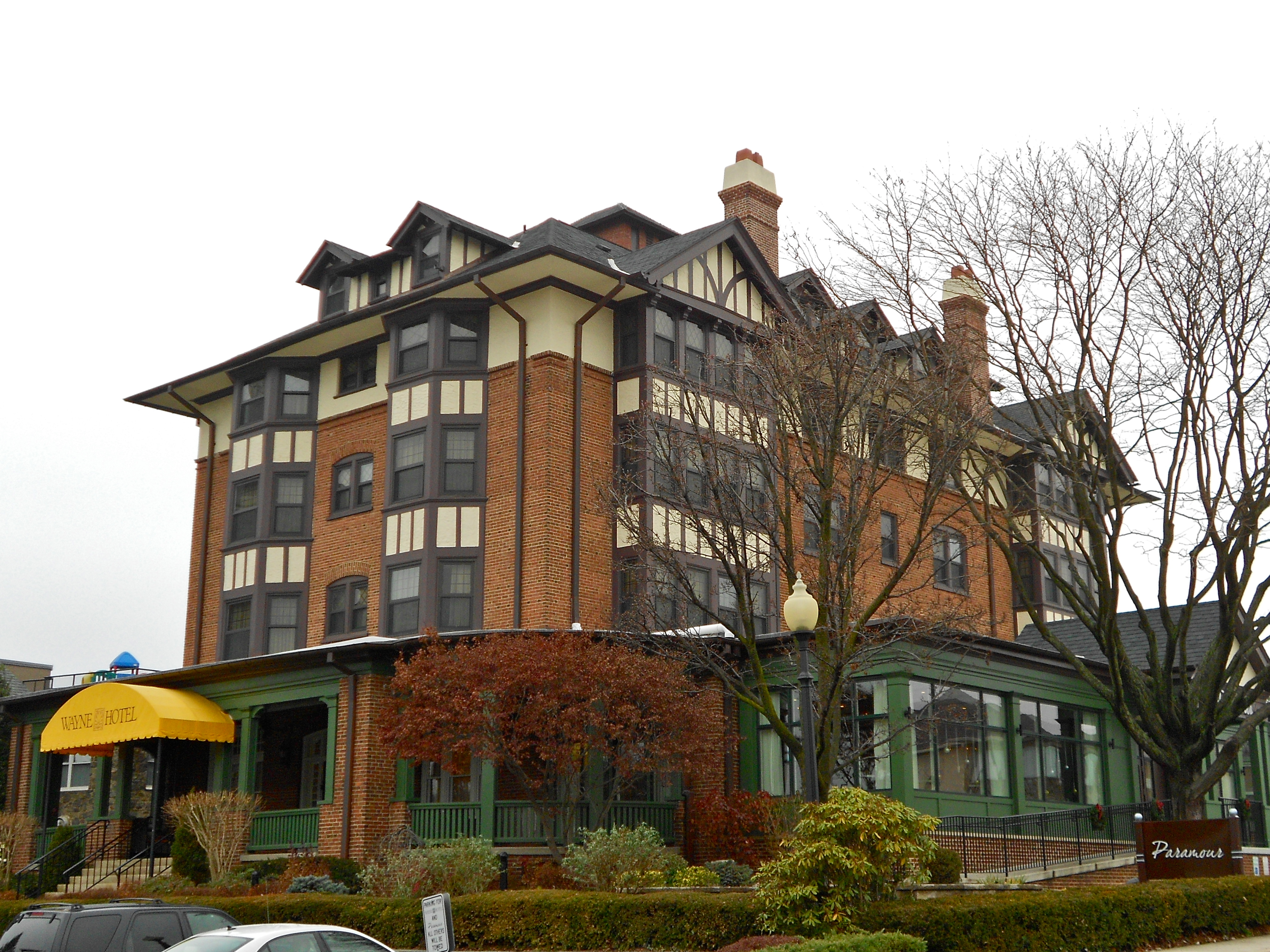
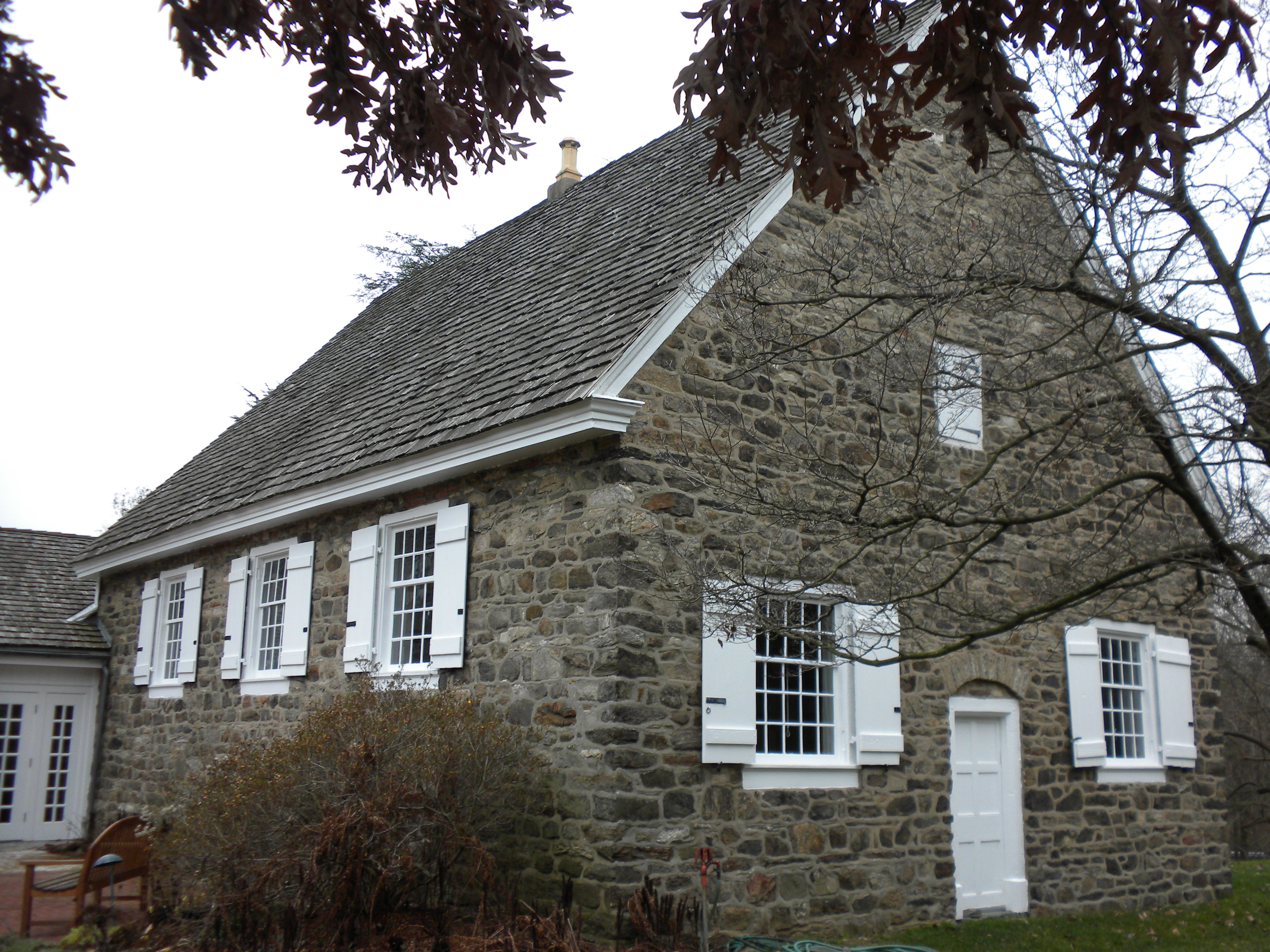
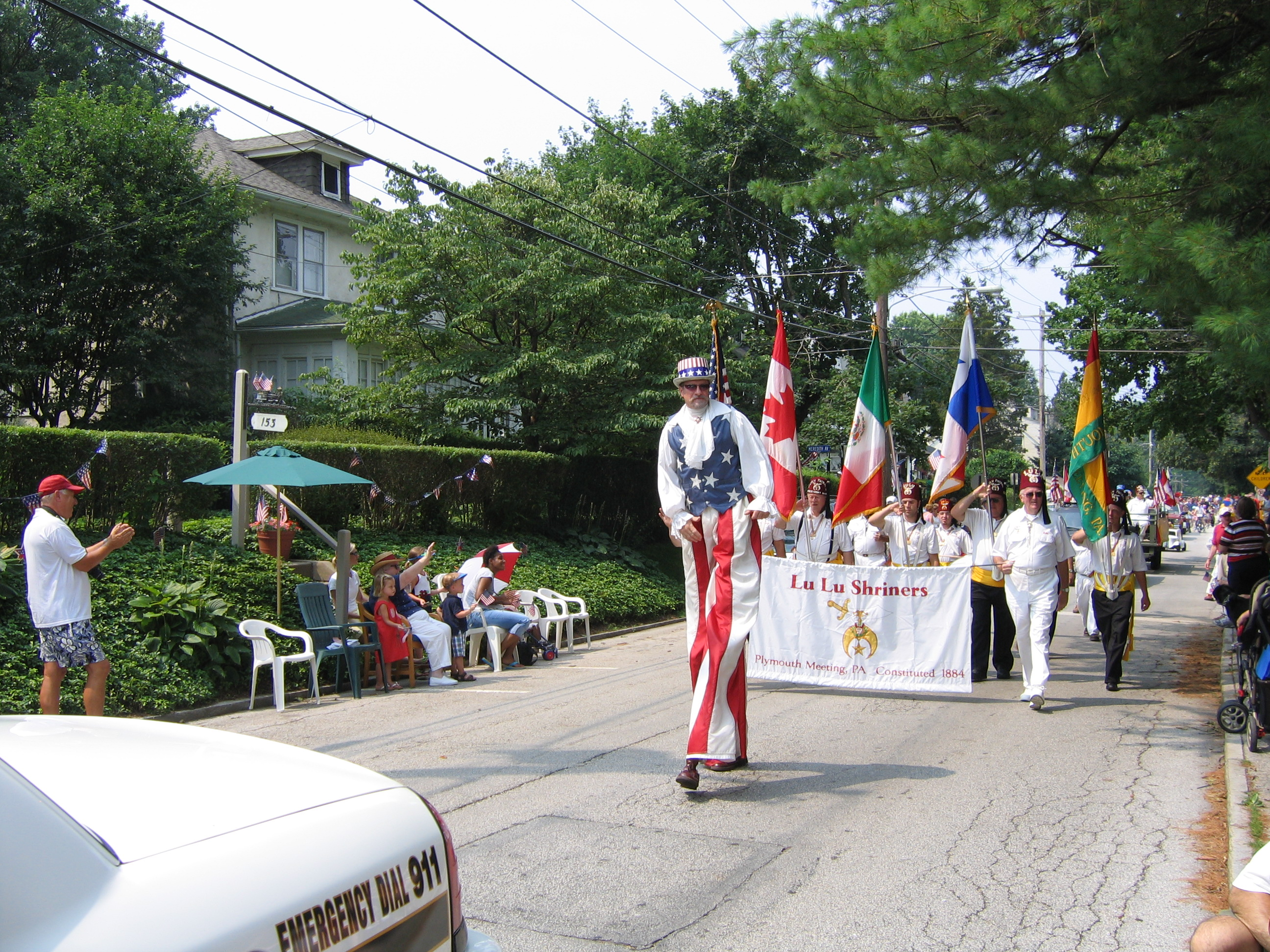
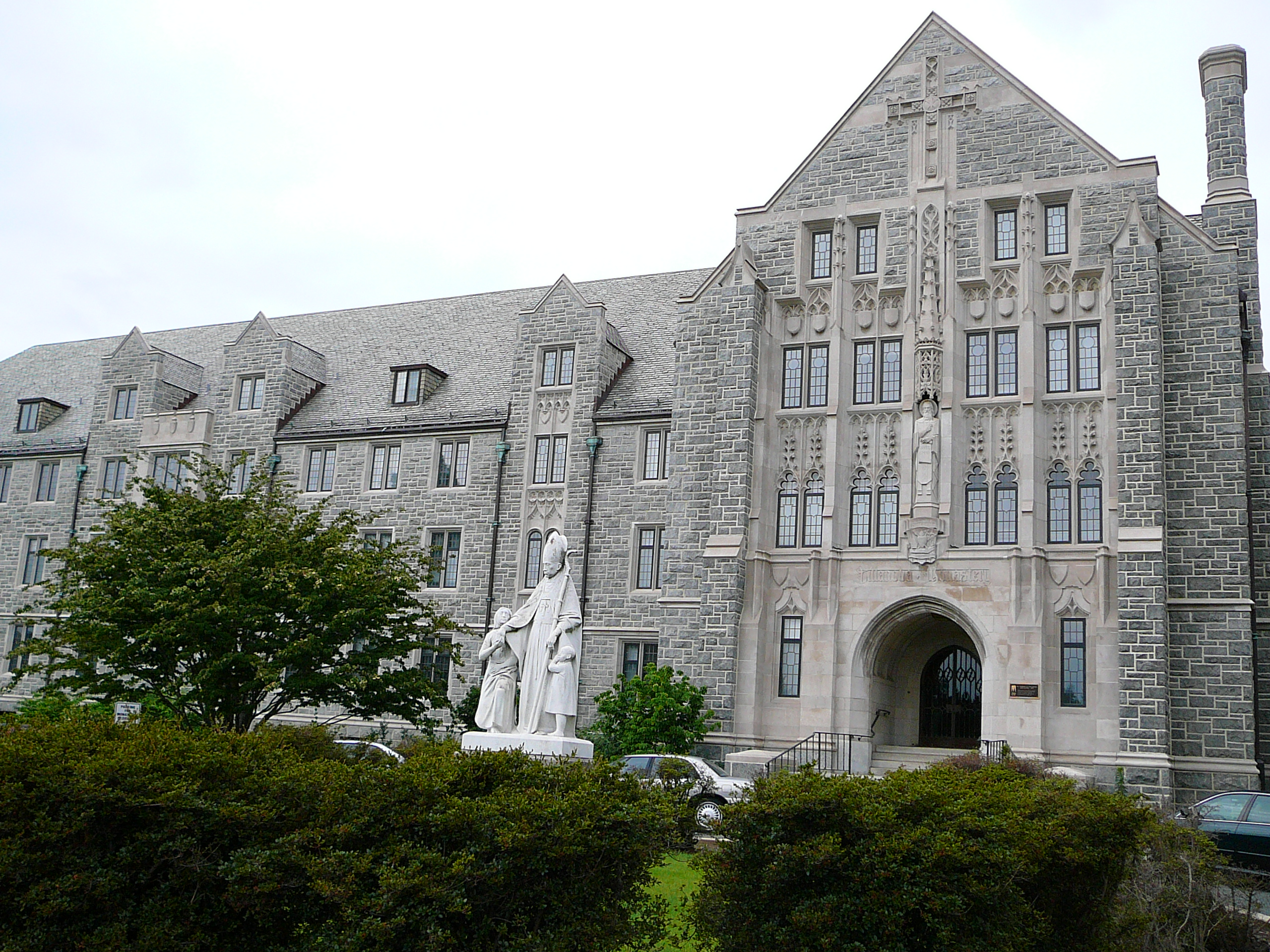
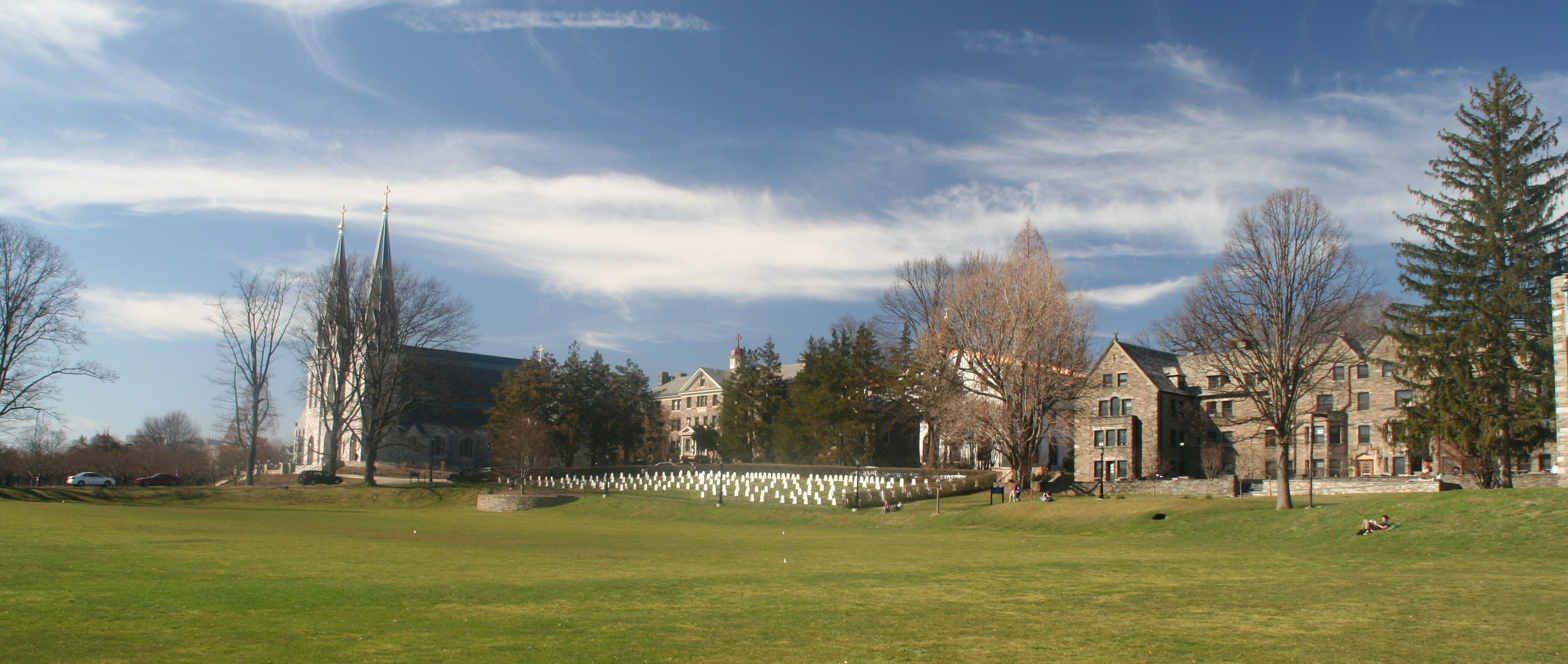
- Clockwise from top: Memorial mile post in Downtown Wayne; Radnor Friends Meetinghouse; St. Thomas Augustinian Monastery; Villanova University; Garrett Hill Independence Day Parade; Wayne Hotel

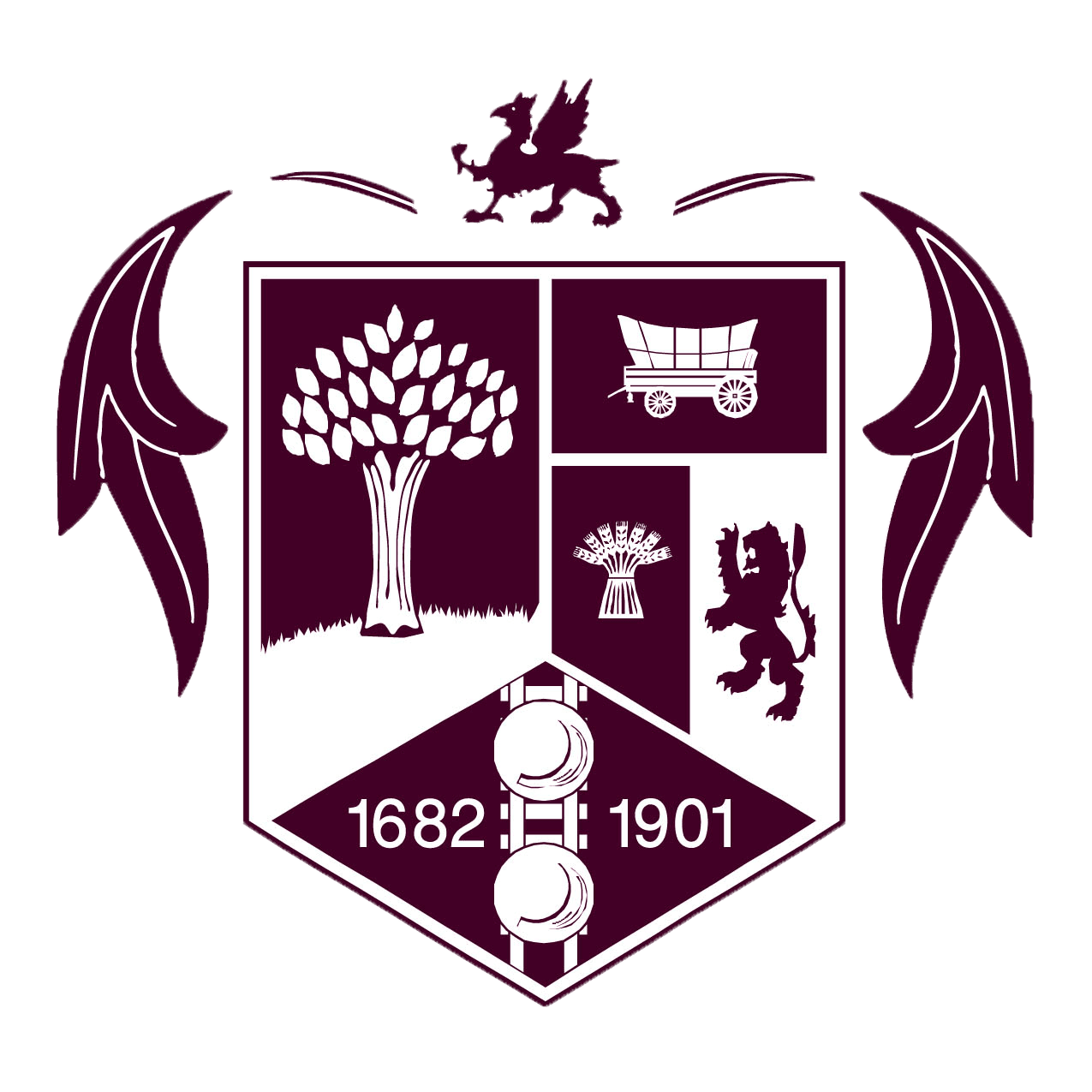
- Seal Logo
- Etymology: Named for Radnorshire, Wales
- Motto: "Best of the Main Line"
- Location of Radnor Township in Delaware County and of Delaware County in Pennsylvania

- Location of Pennsylvania in the United States
- Coordinates: 40°2′11″N 75°22′21″W
- Country: United States
- State: Pennsylvania
- County: Delaware
- Historic colony: Province of Pennsylvania
- Founded: 1682
- Incorporated: 1901
- Founder: William Penn

Government
  - Type: Board of Commissioners
  - Township Manager: William White

Area
  - Total: 13.79 sq mi (35.72 km^{2})
  - Land: 13.78 sq mi (35.68 km^{2})
  - Water: 0.015 sq mi (0.04 km^{2})
- Elevation: 381 ft (116 m)

Population (2010)
  - Total: 31,531
  - Estimate (2019): 31,875
  - Density: 2,309.3/sq mi (891.64/km^{2})
- Demonym: Radnorite
- Time zone: UTC-5 (EST)
  - Summer (DST): UTC-4 (EDT)
- ZIP Code: 190xx
- Area codes: 484 and 610
- FIPS code: 42-045-63264
- Commuter rail: Paoli/Thorndale Line
- Rapid transit: Norristown High Speed Line
- Website: Radnor Township

Radnor Township, often called simply Radnor, is a first class township with home rule status in Delaware County, Pennsylvania, United States.

Radnor Township is part of the famed Main Line of Philadelphia. As of the 2019 United States census, the township's population was 31875. Radnor Township is the largest municipality in Delaware County by land area and the fourth-largest by population, following Upper Darby Township, Haverford Township, and Chester.

Radnor Township is one of the oldest municipalities in Pennsylvania. Radnor Township was founded as a part of the Welsh tract. The original settlers were Welsh-speaking Quakers, led by John Roberts, in an attempt to establish a barony of Wales in Pennsylvania. In about 1681, a group of Welsh Quakers met with William Penn to secure a grant of land in which they could conduct their affairs in their own language. The parties agreed on a tract covering 40,000 acres (160 km^{2}), to be constituted as a separate county whose people and government could conduct their affairs in Welsh. William Penn, an English Quaker, laid out the township in an elongated rectangle located parallel to the Schuylkill River, and the borders of the township have remained unchanged since its founding in 1682.

In 1717, the Welsh Friends built a meeting house on a trail made by the Susquehannock in Radnor Township. Radnor Township grew around the meeting house and remained the center of population of the township for 200 years. The new township was named Radnor after the county in Wales called Radnorshire. The influence of the Welsh, some of whom were forced by heavy taxation to sell their land, waned in the latter half of the 18th century. A hint of Radnor's beginnings remain in the names of streets and places evident throughout the community, such as the St. Davids neighborhood, named for Saint David, the patron saint of Wales.

There are a number of colleges and universities located in Radnor Township, the largest being Villanova University. The Valley Forge Military College is located in the neighborhood of Wayne and Eastern University is located in the neighborhood of St. Davids.

== History ==
=== Colonial era ===
In 1681, Richard Davies purchased 5,000 acres from William Penn. These lands were sold to various purchasers and were mainly in the location of current Radnor Township. The township was part of the Welsh Tract and was named for Radnorshire in Wales. In 1717, the Welsh Friends erected a Quaker meetinghouse (Radnor Friends Meetinghouse) near what is now the intersection of Conestoga Road and Sproul Road at the geographic center of the township. The new town, "Radnorville", later known as the community of "Ithan" after nearby Ithan Creek, grew around the meetinghouse. The Welsh influence waned in the late 18th century as many left the area due to high taxation. Stone monuments were erected in various locations throughout the township in the late 20th century to commemorate the township's Welsh heritage.

=== 18th century ===
In 1794, the Philadelphia and Lancaster Turnpike was built through Radnor Township, making it the first toll road in the United States, and connecting the cities of Philadelphia and Lancaster, Pennsylvania. The turnpike was populated by businesses over time and forms the modern Lancaster Avenue. Lancaster Avenue is the largest and busiest roadway in Radnor Township that is not an interstate, and along it lies many notable places, including Villanova University and Downtown Wayne.

The Columbia Railroad, later part of the Pennsylvania Railroad also passed through the township in 1832. As a result, Radnor Township is today recognized among the collection of Philadelphia suburbs known as the Main Line. The Main Line railroad facilities are still used by SEPTA (the Philadelphia area's transit authority) for its Paoli/Thorndale Line and Amtrak.

=== 19th and 20th centuries ===
In the 1880s, George W. Childs bought property in the community of Louella in the western part of Radnor Township, renamed the area Wayne, Pennsylvania (after American Revolutionary War hero Anthony Wayne) and organized one of the United States's first suburban developments.

A separate railroad passing through Radnor Township, the Philadelphia and Western Railroad, was opened in the early 20th century. Today, parts of that railroad are still used as SEPTA's Norristown High Speed Line, while others have been repurposed into walking trails, which are sometimes referred to as Whiteboard Paths by the locals.

== Geography ==
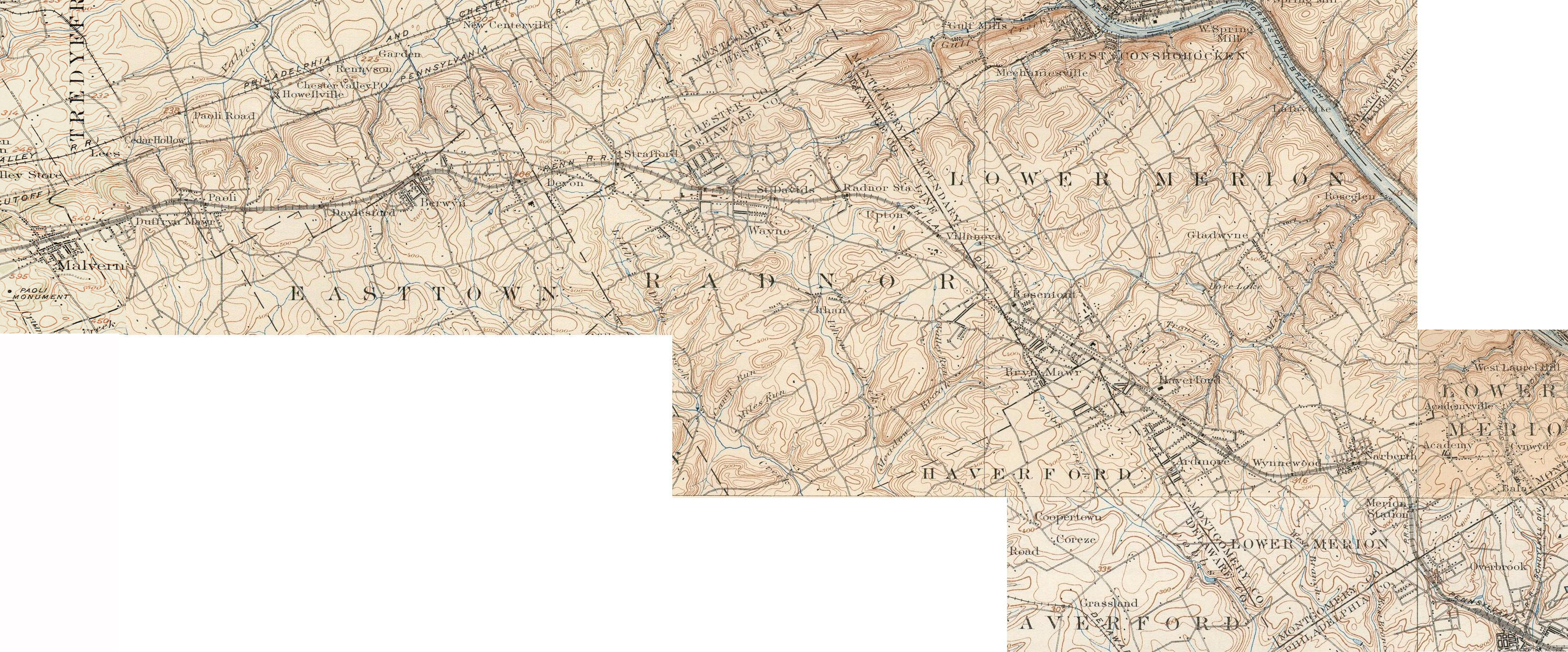
An 1895 map showing most of Radnor Township together with other communities on the Philadelphia Main Line

According to the U.S. Census Bureau, the township has a total area of 13.8 square miles (36 km^{2}), of which 13.8 square miles (36 km^{2}) is land and 0.07% is water. Waterways in Radnor Township include Darby Creek, Ithan Creek, Little Darby Creek, Meadowbrook Run, and Gulph Creek.

=== Climate ===
Radnor Township has a hot-summer humid continental climate (Dfa) and the hardiness zone is 7a. Average monthly temperatures in St. Davids range from 30.7 °F in January to 75.4 °F in July.

=== Locations ===
==== Adjacent municipalities ====
- Tredyffrin Township-northwest
- Upper Merion Township-north and northeast
- Lower Merion Township-east
- Haverford Township-southeast
- Marple Township-south
- Newtown Township-southwest
- Easttown Township-west

==== Neighborhoods ====
Radnor Township is divided into many neighborhoods. Some of these neighborhoods are well-defined, while others have unclear boundaries. The unincorporated community of Wayne is further divided into smaller historic districts: the North Wayne Historic District and South Wayne Historic District, used as residential areas, and the Downtown Wayne Historic District used for commercial activity. Some mainly residential neighborhoods include St. Davids, Ithan and Rosemont. The unincorporated communities of Garrett Hill and Villanova are notable for their substantial Catholic populations. Some neighborhoods, such as Strafford, Bryn Mawr, and Villanova, are split over municipal lines and are shared by at least one other township adjacent to Radnor.

== Demographics ==
=== Ethnicities ===
As of 2010 census, the racial makeup of the township was 85.8% White, 3.9% African American, 0.2% Native American, 7.9% Asian, 0.6% from other races, and 1.6% from two or more races. Hispanic or Latino of any race were 3.0% of the population Explore Census Data.

Historical population
Census	Pop.	Note	%±
1930	12,263		—
1940	12,012		−2.0%
1950	14,709		22.5%
1960	21,697		47.5%
1970	28,782		32.7%
1980	27,676		−3.8%
1990	28,703		3.7%
2000	30,878		7.6%
2010	31,531		2.1%
2020	33,228		5.4%
U.S. Decennial Census

As of the 2000 census, there were 30,878 people, 10,347 households, and 6,373 families residing in the township. The population density was 2,244.3 inhabitants per square mile (866.5/km^{2}). There were 10,731 housing units at an average density of 779.9 units per square mile (301.1 units/km^{2}). The racial makeup of the township was 89.55% White, 5.67% Asian, 3.09% African American, 0.08% Native American, 0.02% Pacific Islander, 0.62% from other races, and 0.98% from two or more races. 2.03% of the population were Hispanic or Latino of any race.

=== Familial size ===
There were 10,347 households, out of which 29.4% had children under the age of 18 living with them, 52.9% were married couples living together, 6.8% had a female householder with no husband present, and 38.4% were non-families. 31.1% of all households were made up of individuals, and 12.1% had someone living alone who was 65 years of age or older. The average household size was 2.39 and the average family size was 3.08.

=== Age and poverty ===
In the township, the population was spread out, with 19.5% under the age of 18, 24.0% from 18 to 24, 22.5% from 25 to 44, 20.6% from 45 to 64, and 13.4% who were 65 years of age or older. The median age was 32 years. For every 100 females, there were 87.2 males. For every 100 females age 18 and over, there were 83.6 males.

According to a 2007 estimate, the median income for a household in the township was $86,812, and the median income for a family was $113,601. Males had a median income of $71,308 versus $42,652 for females. The per capita income for the township was $39,813. About 2.4% of families and 6.7% of the population were below the poverty line, including 2.9% of those under age 18 and 7.8% of those age 65 or over.

=== Religion ===
Religion in Radnor Township
religion	percent
Catholic	48.1%
Unaffiliated	35.5%
Protestant	10.5%
Other Christian	3.1%
Muslim	0.8%
Jewish	0.6%

The population of Radnor Township in 2010 was 31,531. Of these, about 20,337 (64.5%) were estimated to belong to some form of organized religion. Pennsylvania was unique in its guarantee of religious freedoms, one result of this uncommon freedom was a wide religious diversity, which continues to the present.

Quakerism was brought to Radnor after William Penn granted Welsh settlers land west of Philadelphia to establish the Welsh Tract. The Radnor Friends Meetinghouse was built in 1717. Beginning in the nineteenth century, an influx of Irish, Italian, and Polish immigrants to the Delaware Valley caused the growth of Catholic neighborhoods in Garrett Hill and Villanova. The development of these Catholic communities expanded further with the foundation of Villanova University and Cabrini University.

According to Sperling's BestPlaces, the largest religious group in Radnor Township is the Catholic Church, represented by the Archdiocese of Philadelphia. Almost half of Radnor residents identify as Catholics, and there are more Catholic parishes in Radnor than any other religious group. According to the Archdiocese of Philadelphia, Radnorites are served by five parishes: St. Thomas of Villanova Parish, St. Katharine of Siena Parish, SS. Colman and John Neumann Parish, Our Mother of Good Counsel Parish, and St. Monica Parish.

St. David's Episcopal Church is one of the oldest houses of worship in Radnor and one of the oldest in the United States. Its parish is divided between Radnor and Newtown Township in Delaware County, as well as Easttown Township in Chester County. St. David's Episcopal Parish is the largest in the Episcopal Diocese of Pennsylvania.

=== Languages ===
As of 2000, 90.57% (26,115) of Radnor residents aged five and older spoke only English at home, while 9.43% (2,720) spoke any language besides English. Among the largest were Spanish (2.46%), French (0.99%) and Chinese (0.87%).

== Landmarks ==
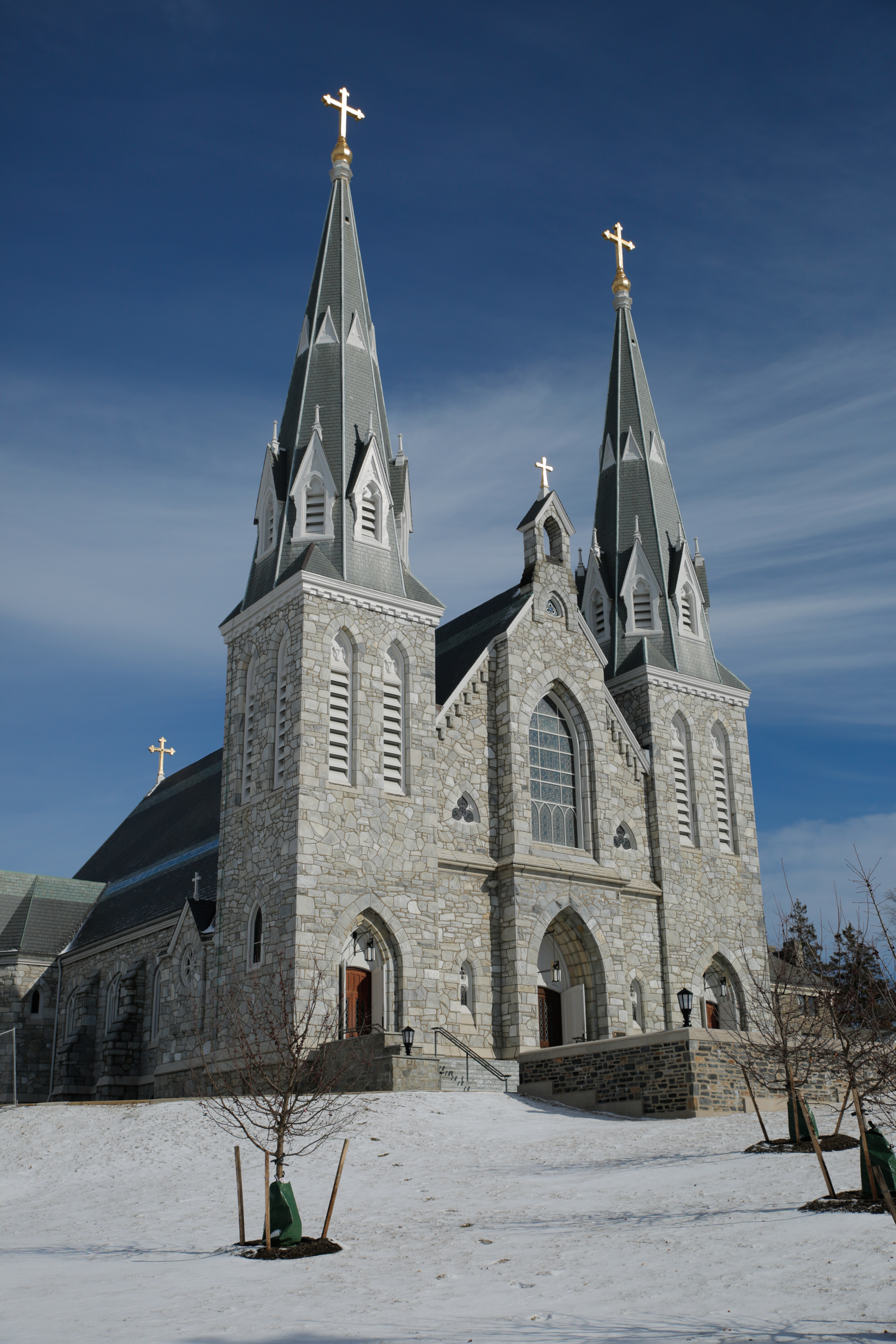
St. Thomas of Villanova Church, the parish church and university chapel of Villanova University

St. Thomas of Villanova Church in Villanova is known for its Gothic Revival architecture. The church, built between 1883 and 1887, is considered to have been the tallest man-made structure between the Delaware River and Lancaster at the time of its construction. Today, the church is nearly entirely whitewashed on the interior and lit by blue stained glass windows. Much of the original decoration has been preserved, although moved to different locations in the parish and campus. The windows enclosing the nave depict the life of St. Augustine.

St. David's Episcopal Church, whose graveyard, and buildings begun in 1715, is listed on the National Register of Historic Places. The grave yard hosts many founders including the celebrated revolutionary General “Mad” Anthony Wayne.

The Bridge in Radnor Township No.1, Bridge in Radnor Township No.2, Camp-Woods, Chanticleer, Downtown Wayne Historic District, Glenays, North Wayne Historic District, Pennsylvania Railroad Station at Wayne, Radnor Friends Meetinghouse, South Wayne Historic District, Wayne Hotel, and Woodcrest are listed on the National Register of Historic Places.

Other historic structures in Radnor Township include the Sorrel Horse, a former tavern located on Conestoga Road that sheltered George Washington and Lafayette during the Continental Army's retreat back to Philadelphia from the Battle of Brandywine.

== Economy ==
Lincoln Financial Group is headquartered in Radnor Township. In 2007 the company moved 400 employees, including its top executives, to Radnor from Philadelphia. Other companies based in Radnor Township include, J. G. Wentworth, TV Guide magazine, and Airgas.

=== Top employers ===
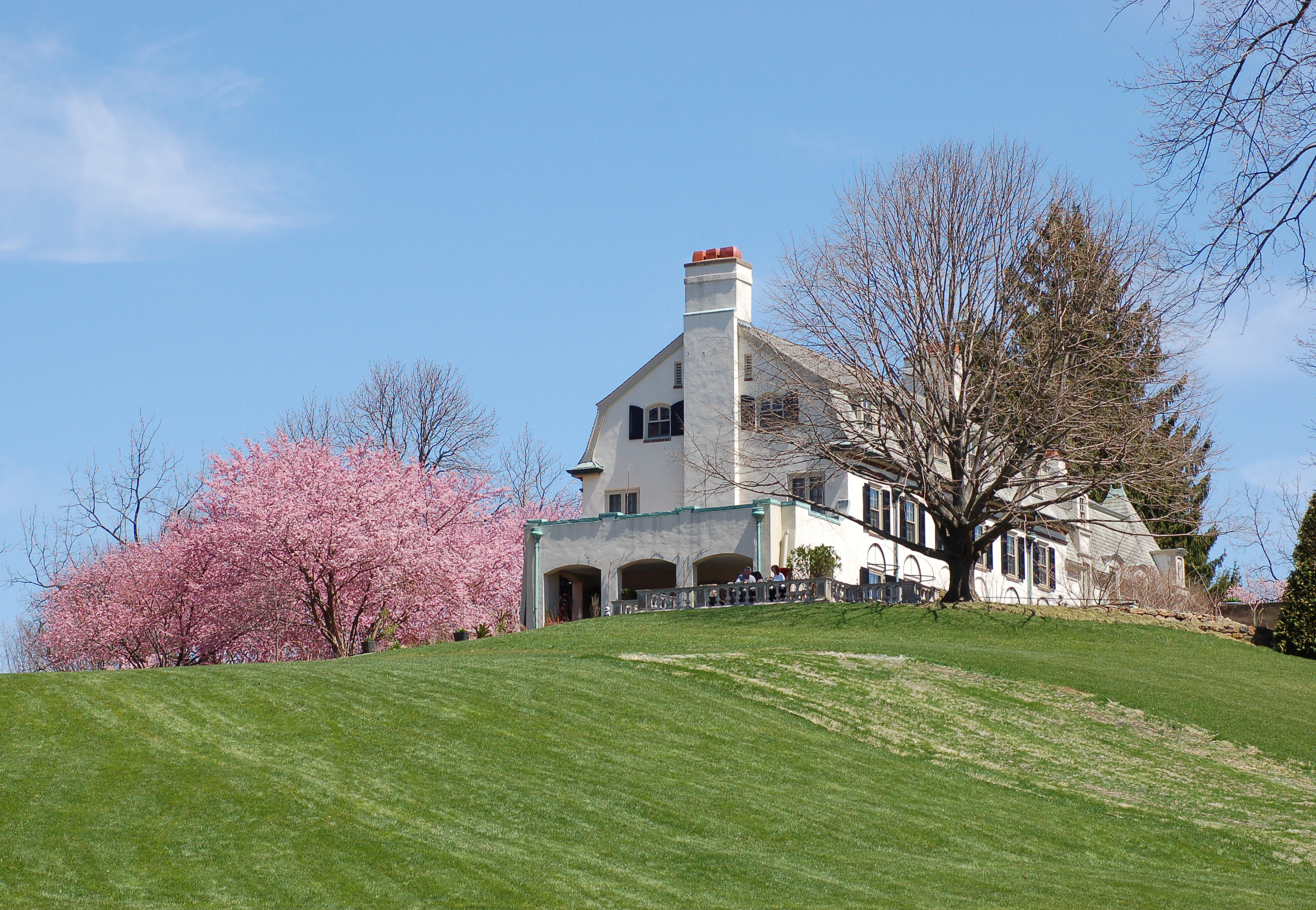
The main house at Chanticleer Garden

According to Radnor Township's 2013 Comprehensive Annual Financial Report, the top employers in the city are:

#	Employer	# of employees	Community
1	Villanova University	3,438	Villanova
2	Radnor Township School District	933	Wayne
3	Eastern University	841	St. Davids
4	Lincoln Financial	641	Radnor
5	VWR	448	Radnor
6	Janssen Biotech	403	Radnor
7	Penn Medicine Radnor	367	Radnor
8	Cabrini University	332	Radnor
9	Jefferson Health System	318	Radnor
10	J.G. Wentworth	279	Radnor

== Education ==
=== Primary and secondary schools ===
==== Public schools ====
Pupils in Radnor Township attend Radnor Township School District. Radnor High School and Radnor Middle School are the sole public high and middle schools of the district. There are three elementary schools in the RTSD: Radnor Elementary School, Ithan Elementary School, and Wayne Elementary School.

==== Private schools ====
Archbishop John Carroll High School, a Roman Catholic high school in the Archdiocese of Philadelphia. Valley Forge Military Academy and College contains a boarding school program for seventh through twelfth grades. The Agnes Irwin School is an all-girls school for prekindergarten through twelfth grade. St. Katharine of Siena is a Catholic school in Wayne for students in kindergarten through eighth grade. The Hill Top Preparatory School in Ithan is for students with learning disabilities in fifth through twelfth grade. Armenian Sisters Academy, an Armenian primary school, has a Radnor postal address but is located in Upper Merion Township.

=== Colleges and universities ===
Villanova University (including the former Cabrini University) and Eastern University are located within Radnor Township. Valley Forge Military Academy and College operates a two-year junior college.

== Sports ==
Radnor Township is home to the Villanova Wildcats, the NCAA Division I athletic program of Villanova University, the Cabrini Cavaliers, the NCAA Division III athletic program of Cabrini University, and the Eastern Eagles, the NCAA Division III athletic program of Eastern University.

The Villanova Wildcats operate an athletic program that includes their men's basketball team. The Wildcats are consistently ranked among the AP Top 25, and won the NCAA Division I men's basketball tournament in 1985, 2016, and 2018. Each of these championships featured celebrations by students at the intersection of Lancaster and Ithan Avenues.

The Cabrini Cavaliers won their first NCAA Division III Men's Lacrosse Championship in 2019, defeating the Amherst Mammoths by a score of 16–12.

School	Nickname	Colors	Association	Conference
Villanova University	Wildcats	Blue and white	NCAA Division I	Big East
Cabrini University	Cavaliers	Blue and white	NCAA Division III	Atlantic East
Eastern University	Eagles	Maroon and white	NCAA Division III	MAC

== Infrastructure ==
=== Transportation ===
==== Public transportation ====
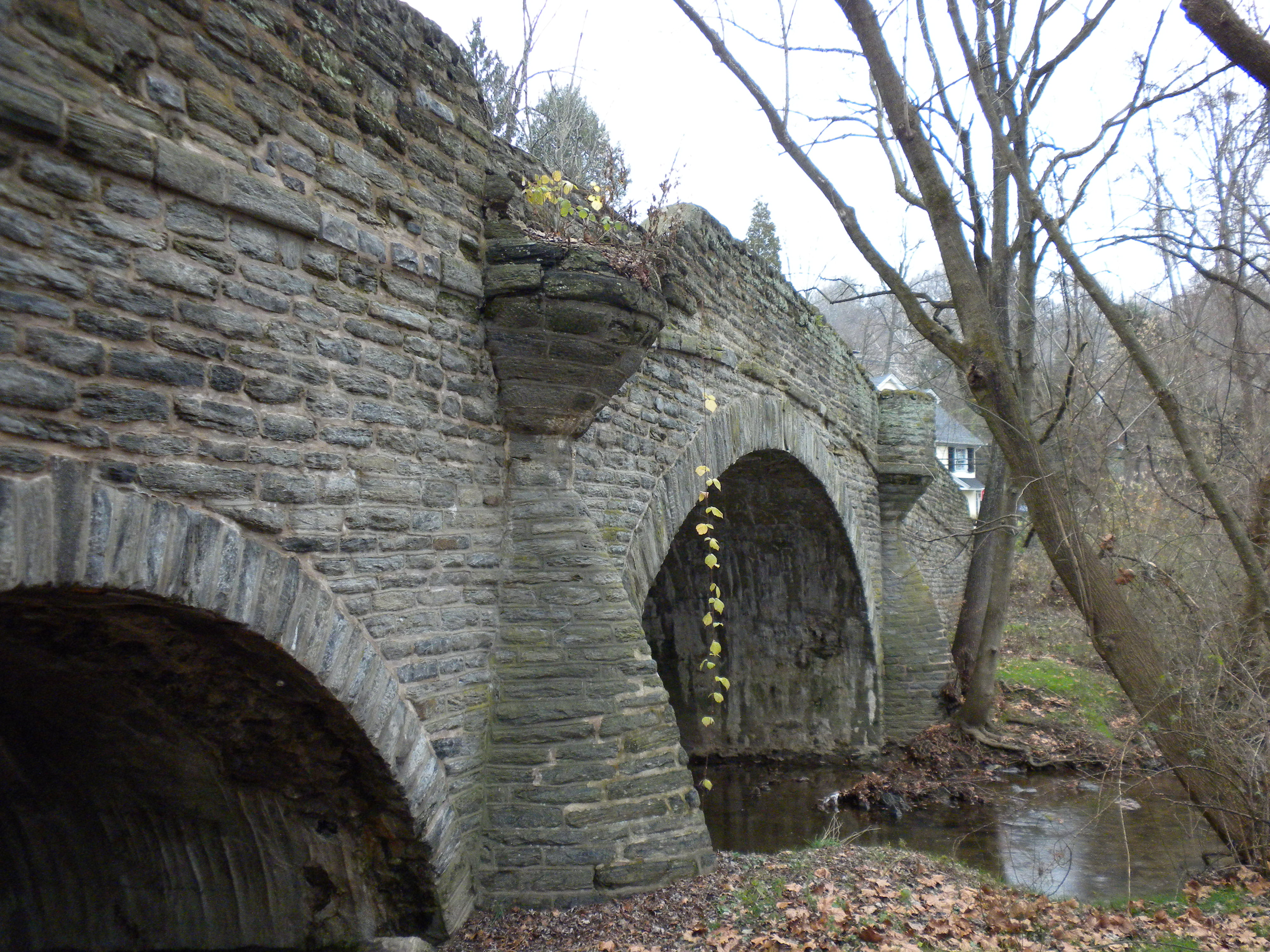
Goshen Road Bridge

Radnor Township is serviced by SEPTA Regional Rail's Paoli/Thorndale Line, which has stations within the township at Wayne, St. Davids, Radnor, and Villanova. Eastern Radnor Township is served by SEPTA's Norristown High Speed Line, an interurban heavy rail line. Within Radnor Township, there are seven stations located at Bryn Mawr, Roberts Road, Garrett Hill, Stadium – Ithan Avenue, Villanova, Radnor, and County Line.

SEPTA Suburban Bus Route 105 runs through the center of Radnor Township via Lancaster Avenue, excluding a brief deviation along King of Prussia and Radnor-Chester Roads to service the Norristown High Speed Line's Radnor Station and Paoli/Thorndale Line's Radnor Station. The 105 serves the communities of Rosemont, Villanova, St. Davids, Radnor, and Wayne with westbound access to Paoli and eastbound access to the 69th Street Transportation Center in Upper Darby. The 105 bus formerly drove a route similar to that of the 106, but a 2016 schedule change moved the route's western terminus to Rosemont Station, on Montrose Avenue near the border of Radnor Township and Lower Merion Township. Since 2017, the route runs parallel to Radnor Township's border on Airedale Road, but never enters the township. On August 23, 2026, the 105 replaced the 106 bus to Paoli.

==== Roads and highways ====
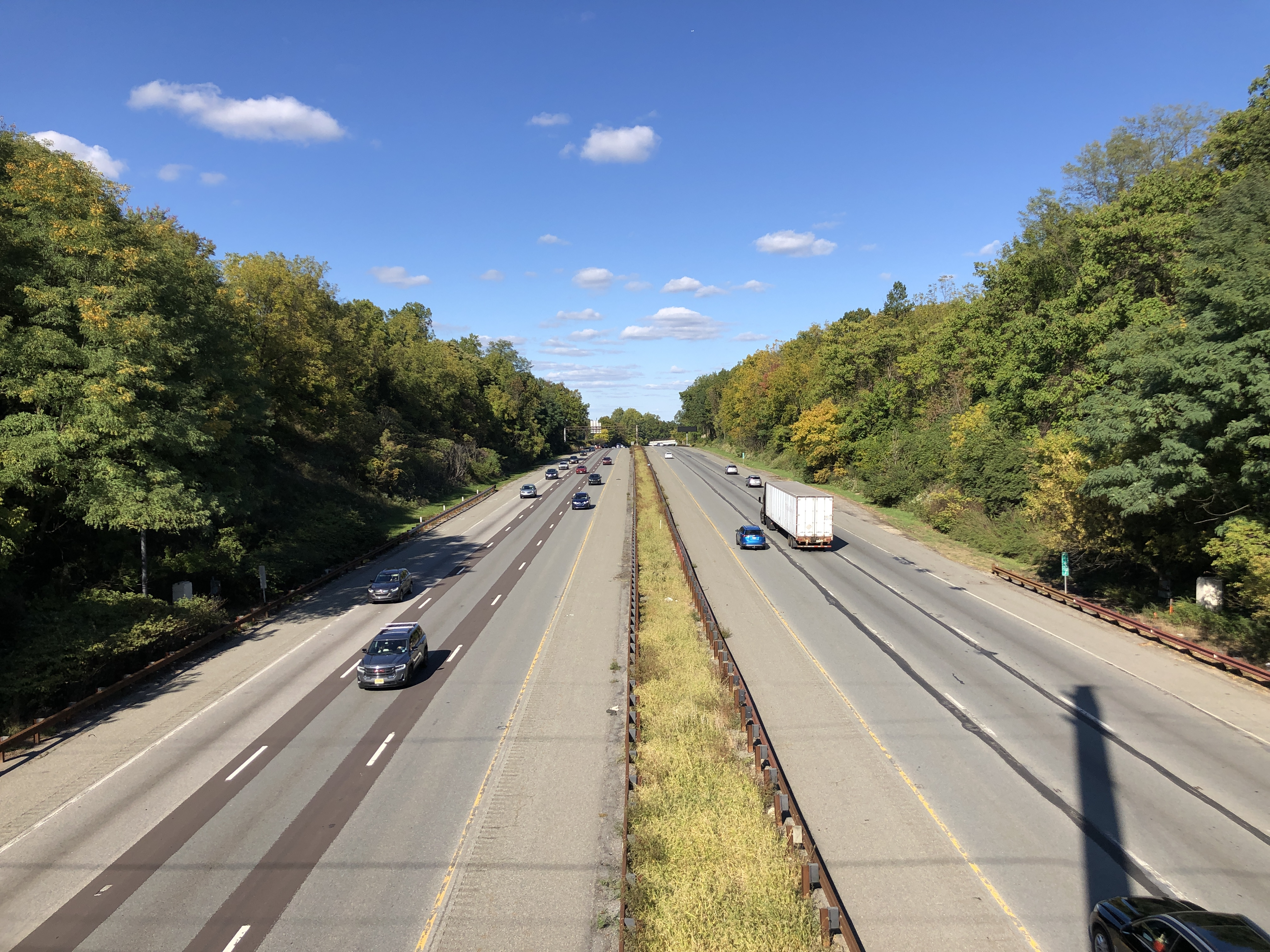
I-476, also known as the "Blue Route", northbound in Radnor Township

As of 2018, there were 118.96 miles (191.45 km) of public roads in Radnor Township, of which 33.59 miles (54.06 km) were maintained by Pennsylvania Department of Transportation (PennDOT) and 85.37 miles (137.39 km) were maintained by the township.

Highways serving Radnor Township include U.S. Route 30, which passes east–west through the township on Lancaster Avenue (part of the historical Lincoln Highway), Pennsylvania Route 320, which passes north–south through the township along Sproul Road and Spring Mill Road; and Interstate 476, which passes north–south through the township on the Blue Route and has an interchange with US 30.

=== Healthcare ===
The corporate offices of Main Line Health and Thomas Jefferson University's Marcus Institute clinic are both located in the Radnor Financial Center. In 2020, Penn Medicine opened a hospital next to the Blue Route called Penn Medicine Radnor.

== Notable people ==
- Jacob M. Appel, novelist, Einstein's Beach House
- Jane Barkman, Olympian
- David Brooks, journalist
- Randal Kleiser, movie director, Grease and The Blue Lagoon
- Thomas F. Wilson, actor, Biff in Back to the Future
- Joshua Wurman, atmospheric scientist

== In popular culture ==
Taps was filmed at Valley Forge Military Academy and College.
