= William Edward Atkinson =

American Quadriplegic Catholic priest (1946–2006)

Servant of God William Edward Atkinson OSA
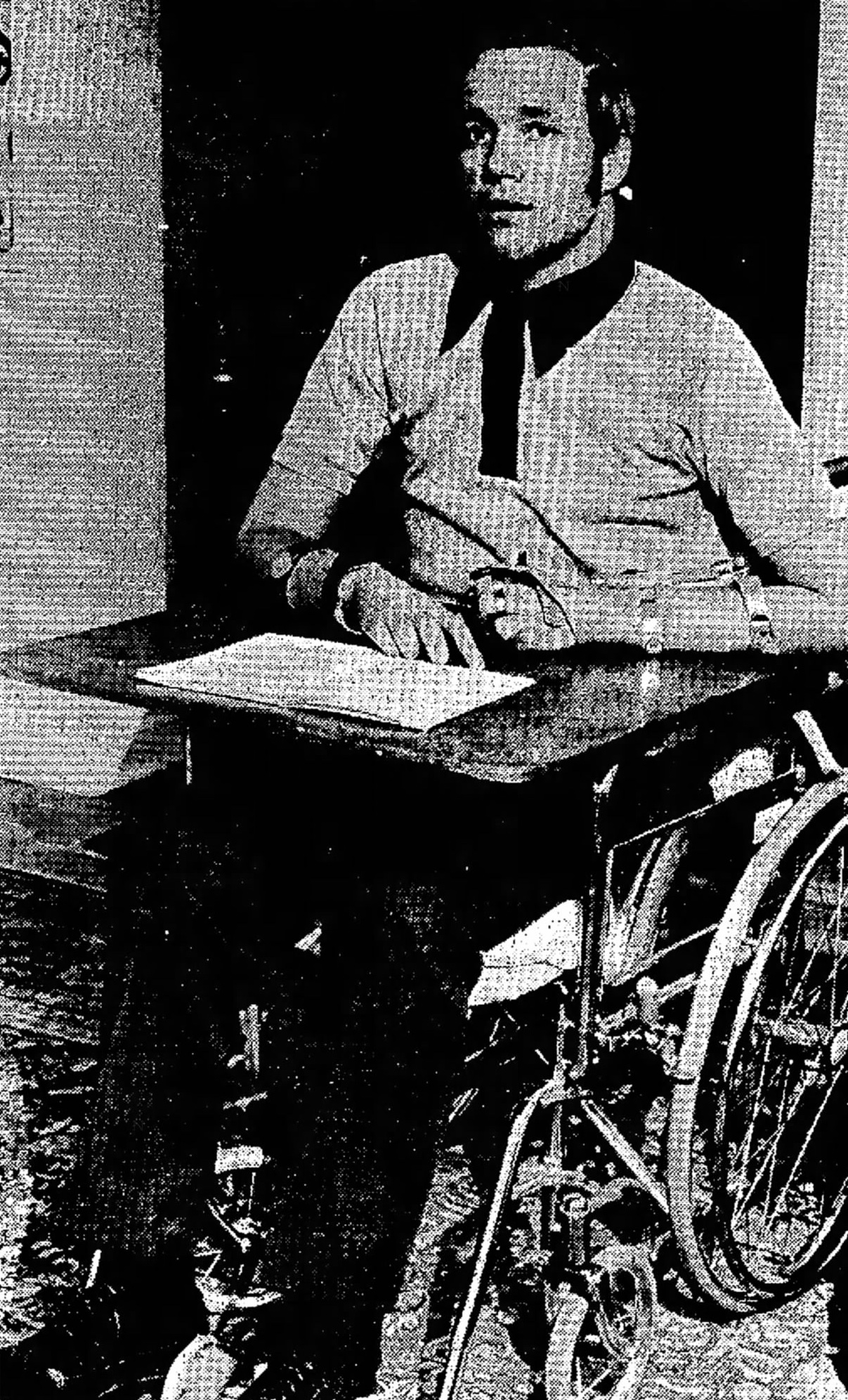
- Atkinson in 1974, shortly before his ordination.

Priest, Augustinian Friar, educator
- Born: January 4, 1946; Philadelphia, Pennsylvania, U.S.
- Died: September 15, 2006 (aged 60); Villanova, Pennsylvania, U.S.
- Venerated in: Catholicism

Ordination history
History
Priestly ordination
- Ordained by: John Krol

William Edward Atkinson, OSA (January 4, 1946 – September 15, 2006) was an American Catholic priest and educator. An Augustinian, he was the first quadriplegic priest ordained in the Catholic Church.

Then-Philadelphia Archbishop Charles J. Chaput opened Atkinson's cause for canonization on April 24, 2017, designating him as a servant of God. On October 19, 2021, Archbishop Nelson J. Pérez closed the cause at the diocesan level and sent documentation to be presented to the Dicastery for the Causes of Saints at the Vatican.

== Early life and education ==
William Edward Atkinson was born on January 4, 1946, in Philadelphia, Pennsylvania, to Allen and Mary (née Connelly) Atkinson. He was one of seven children, having two brothers and four sisters. His father worked as a trolley operator for SEPTA. His brother, Al Atkinson played linebacker for the New York Jets from 1965 to 1974. Atkinson attended St. Alice Elementary School in Upper Darby, Pennsylvania, graduating in 1959, and later Monsignor Bonner High School, graduating in 1963.

== Religious vocation and accident ==
After high school, Atkinson entered the Augustinian Academy on Staten Island, New York, as a postulant. He began his novitiate at the Good Counsel Novitiate in New Hamburg, New York, on September 9, 1964. On February 22, 1965, Atkinson was involved in a tobogganing accident that left him paralyzed from the neck down, rendering him a quadriplegic. While going downhill, some snow blew into his face and he ran his sled into a tree. The force of the impact severed his spinal cord at the neck, with doctors later stating that Atkinson should have been killed immediately. He was driven to St. Francis Hospital in Poughkeepsie, a 45-minute drive. Following his arrival, his breathing stopped several times and his fellow seminarians were informed of his death on three separate occasions. Over the course of four months, he lost nearly 100 pounds and had to have a segment of bone from his hip fused into his neck so he could hold his head upright.

He expressed his desire to continue his religious vocation. He resumed his novitiate at St. Mary's Hall, Villanova University, where he was supported by a community of friars who assisted him with daily tasks.

== Ordination and ministry ==
Atkinson professed simple vows on July 20, 1970, and solemn vows on July 20, 1973. With a special dispensation from Pope Paul VI, he was ordained to the priesthood by John Cardinal Krol at St. Alice's Church in Upper Darby on February 2, 1974.

From 1975 until 2004, Father Atkinson served at Monsignor Bonner High School, his alma mater. He taught theology, coordinated senior class retreats, served as assistant school chaplain, moderated the football team, and directed the after-school and Saturday detention program known as "Justice Under God" (JUG). He was known for his sense of humor, effective teaching, and compassionate guidance.

== Later life and death ==
In 2004, due to declining health, Atkinson moved to the Health Care Unit of St. Thomas of Villanova Monastery at Villanova University. He died on September 15, 2006, surrounded by his family and fellow friars. His funeral was held at St. Thomas of Villanova Church, and he was interred in the Augustinian section of Calvary Cemetery in West Conshohocken, Pennsylvania.

== Cause for canonization ==
Atkinson's official cause for canonization began on April 24, 2017 when Archbishop Charles J. Chaput officiated the formal rite to begin the process at St. Thomas of Villanova Church. His remains were subsequently moved to the same church in 2023 to encourage private veneration. At least three reported miracles have been attributed to Atkinson; none have yet been approved by the Congregation for the Causes of Saints.

== Legacy ==
Father Atkinson's life has been the subject of various articles and documentaries from the local community in support of his canonization, highlighting his resilience and dedication to his vocation during his physical challenges. These include a campaign launched in 2024 to create bronze memorial sculptures in his honor, and a documentary ExtraOrdinary produced by the Augustinian Order.
