= Ithan, Pennsylvania =

Ithan
- Unincorporated village
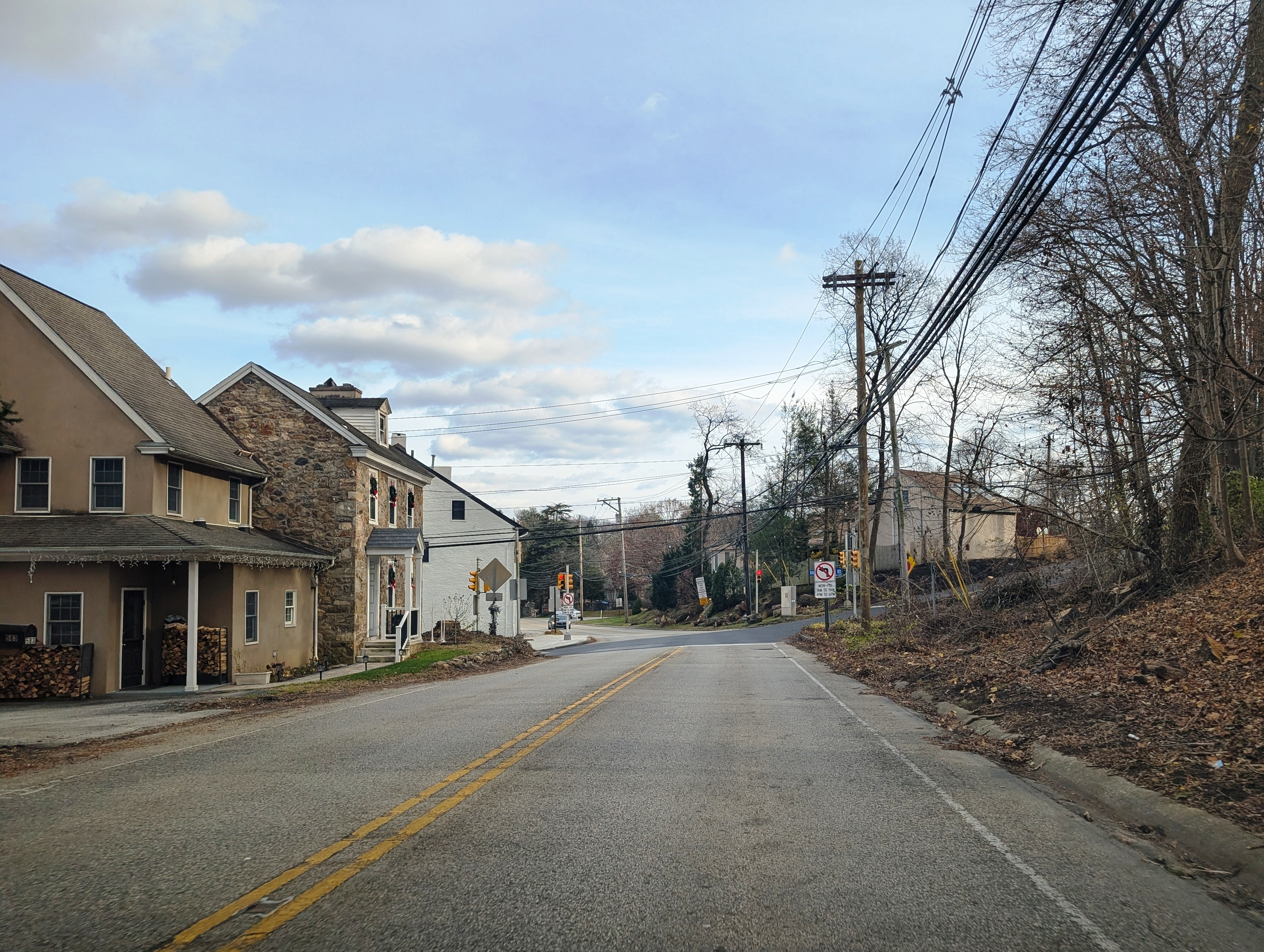
- Eastbound Conestoga Road in the center of Ithan

- Location within Pennsylvania
- Coordinates: 40°01′50″N 75°21′58″W
- Country: United States
- State: Pennsylvania
- County: Delaware
- Township: Radnor
- Elevation: 433 ft (132 m)
- Time zone: UTC-5 (EST)
  - Summer (DST): UTC-4 (EDT)
- ZIP Codes: 19085 & 19087
- Area codes: 610; 484

Ithan (pronounced EYE-thun), formerly known as Radnorville, is a small village and neighborhood located in Villanova, Pennsylvania, west of Philadelphia. It is generally considered to include all portions of Villanova approximately a half mile either side of the Blue Route.

Ithan is centered on the intersection of Radnor Chester and Conestoga Roads, at the site of the Radnor Friends Meetinghouse. It is located approximately 3/4 mile south of Lancaster Avenue on the Main Line. It encompasses the Ardrossan estate and the small community of Banjo Town to the west, and the Agnes Irwin School to the east.

The community is located in the center of Radnor Township, southeast of Wayne, and is nearly entirely residential, barring a small business district on the north side of the Meetinghouse. Prior to the 1980s, Ithan was relatively rural and undeveloped. However, increased population growth in the Philadelphia metropolitan area, along with Ithan's location close to the Main Line, has catapulted Ithan into one of the most desirable suburbs of Philadelphia.

All of Ithan is part of the Radnor Township School District, and the community is also home to the Academy of Notre Dame de Namur.
