= Radnor, Pennsylvania =

Unincorporated community in Pennsylvania, US

Radnor
- Unincorporated community
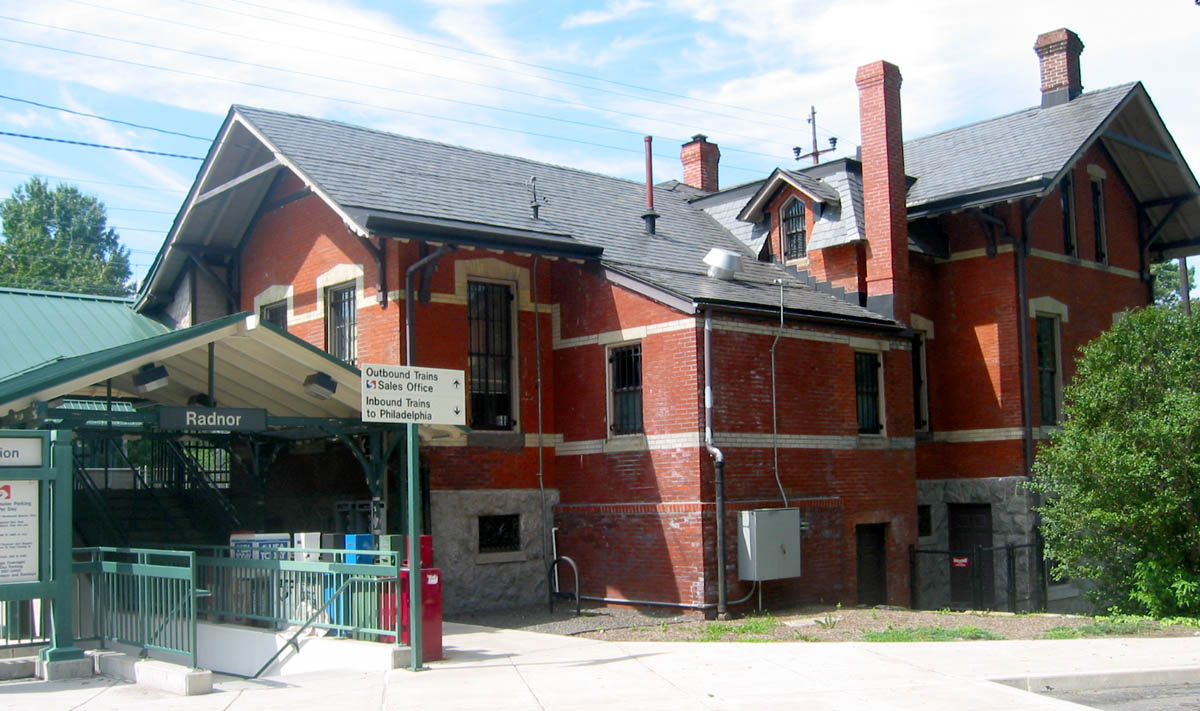
- The Radnor train station building
- Motto: "The Best Place to Live, Work and Do Business on the Main Line"
- Location within Pennsylvania
- Coordinates: 40°02′46″N 75°21′36″W
- Country: United States
- State: Pennsylvania
- County: Montgomery, Delaware
- Township: Upper Merion, Radnor Township
- Elevation: 433 ft (132 m)
- Time zone: UTC-5 (EST)
  - Summer (DST): UTC-4 (EDT)
- ZIP Codes: 19087
- Area codes: 610; 484

Radnor is a community which straddles Montgomery and Delaware Counties, Pennsylvania, United States. It is located approximately 13 miles west of Philadelphia, in the Main Line suburbs. The community was named after Radnor, in Wales.

Radnor is home to Cabrini University and a large office complex by the train station. The southern portion, by Lancaster Avenue, was rapidly commercialized in the 1980s, and it is currently one of suburban Philadelphia's premier office destinations.

== History ==
The community of Radnor was founded in 1686 at the Radnor Friends Meetinghouse, which was located on Conestoga Road, a bypass of Lancaster Avenue connecting Devon and Bryn Mawr. During the Revolutionary War, the meetinghouse was used as an outpost for General George Washington's Continental Army. In 1872, the Pennsylvania Railroad's Main Line was constructed, which briefly passed through the southern section of Radnor. A station serving the town was established at King of Prussia Road, approximately one mile south of the Meetinghouse.

For much of its history, Radnor was primarily a farming community, and relatively undeveloped, even past World War II. Its town center, around the Meetinghouse, remained quaint and secluded from denser development seen in the nearby communities of Wayne and Bryn Mawr. However, starting in the 1980s, Radnor started to see great residential and commercial development, mostly stemming from suburban development for Philadelphia. Additionally, office parks began to spring up in the southern portion of the community, by the train station, primarily due to safety concerns in Center City. Some big name firms, such as Lincoln National Corporation, moved their headquarters from Center City to Radnor, and currently the community is best known for its financial hub around the train station.

In the 1970s, highway planners envisioned the Blue Route expressway passing through Radnor, approximately .3 mile east of the Meetinghouse. The project faced severe backlash from the Radnor community, as what was initially known as a quiet, rural feeling town would have a lot more noise. Despite attempts to quell the project, the community eventually lost, and the Blue Route opened in the 1990s on the initial alignment.

Radnor is where the SEPTA Paoli/Thorndale Line and Norristown High Speed Line intersect. However, the stations are not located at the intersection requiring a small bus ride to transfer. There are plans to build a transfer station where the two lines intersect. A shopping district is also planned here. Work is expected to commence in 2022.

== Geography ==
Like many Main Line communities, Radnor straddles Montgomery and Delaware Counties. The Delaware County portion is very affluent, and was developed prior to World War II. However, both the Montgomery County portion and the extreme southern portion (south of the train line), were developed much later.

Radnor does not have a traditional developed town center, though there are a couple shops and restaurants immediately north of the train station on King of Prussia road. The nearby communities of Wayne, Bryn Mawr, and King of Prussia offer shopping and entertainment.

Radnor is bounded to the west by Wayne, to the south by Villanova, to the east by Gladwyne, and to the northeast by Gulph Mills.

The community is served by the Paoli/Thorndale Line of SEPTA Regional Rail, as well as Lancaster Avenue and Interstate 476. It is also not too far from Interstate 76, providing access to King of Prussia and Center City Philadelphia.

Radnor has a humid continental climate with hot summers, bordering a humid subtropical climate. It is considerably cooler than Center City Philadelphia due to a relatively higher elevation and the urban heat island effect.

== Demographics ==
Radnor Township Demographics include White 76%, Asian. 9%, Hispanic. 6%, African American. 5%, Two or more races. 4%, Other race. 0%. The population of the township is 31875

== Economy ==
Radnor contains the largest commercial business district on the Main Line. Located immediately around the town's train station are several suburban office complexes. Among the companies based in Radnor are real estate company Brandywine Realty Trust, energy company Penn Virginia, insurer Lincoln National, wholesaler VWR, technology company Qlik, and financial company Mondrian Investment Partners.

Radnor's town center around the Meetinghouse isn't well developed, but the nearby communities of Wayne and Bryn Mawr offer several shops and restaurants. Radnor is also easily accessible to King of Prussia.

== Education ==
Public education in Radnor is administered by Radnor Township School District.

Closest universities include Cabrini University, Eastern University, and Villanova University.

== In popular culture ==
Radnor is identified in the script as the setting for Philip Barry's play The Philadelphia Story.

Radnor is also the setting of Judy Blume's young adult novel, Blubber.

Radnor High School was the model for Rydell High School in Grease; the director, Randal Kleiser, is a member of the Class of 1964.

== Notable people ==
- Ian Checcio (born 1975) – soccer player
- Fritz Coleman (born 1948) – weather forecaster, podcaster, radio host, and disc jockey
- Ted Dean (born 1938) – National Football League (NFL) player
- Truxtun Hare (1878–1956) – hammer thrower, runner, college football player, and two-time Olympian
- Gerard Phelan (born 1963) – NFL player
- Herman P. Schwan (1915–2005) – German-born biomedical engineer and biophysicist
- Sean Scott (born 1978) – NFL player
- Joshua Wurman (born 1960) – atmospheric scientist and inventor of the Doppler on Wheels and bistatic radar systems
