= Baccalaureate service =

Public gathering

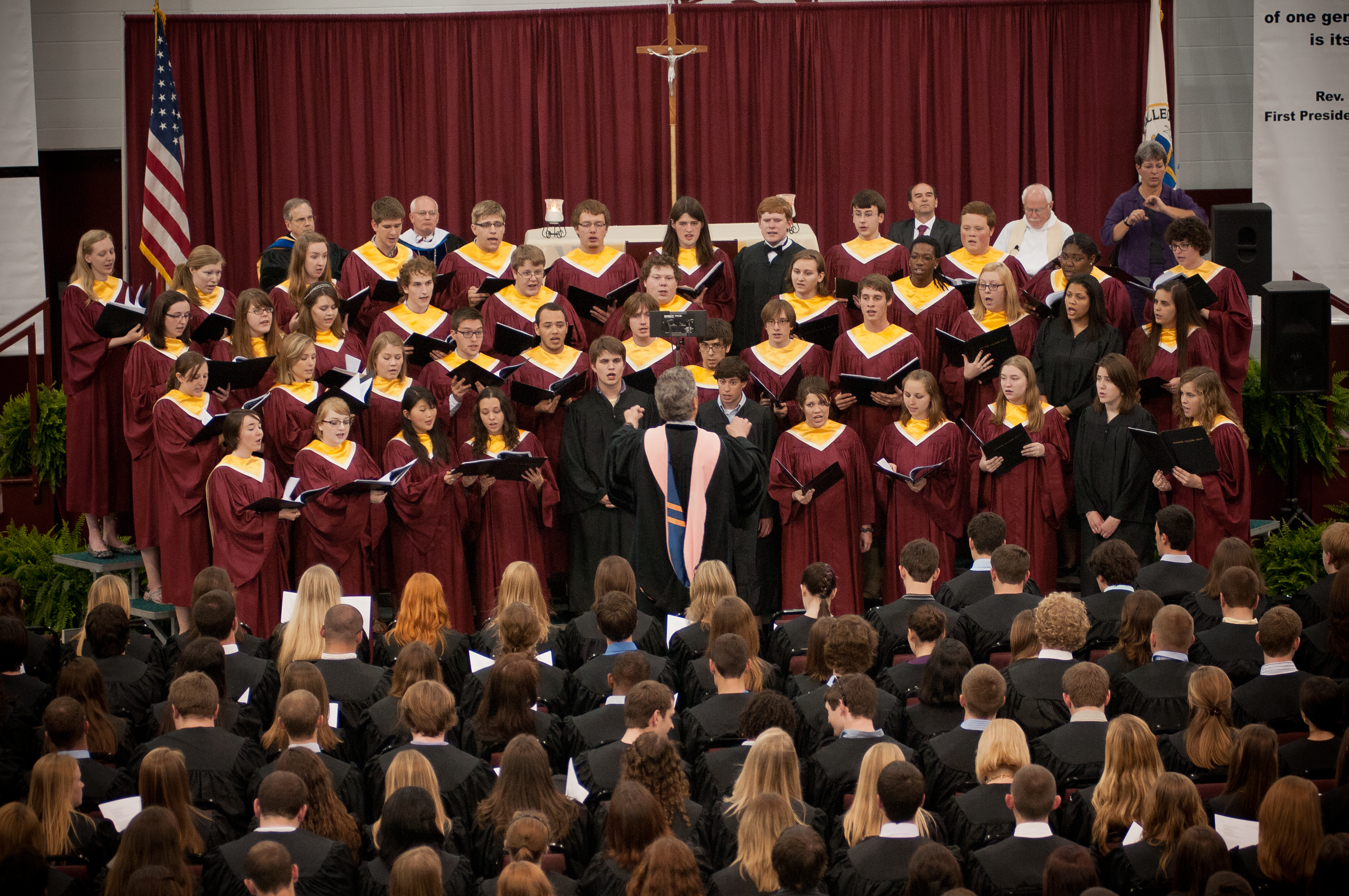
The Roanoke College choir performing at a Baccalaureate service

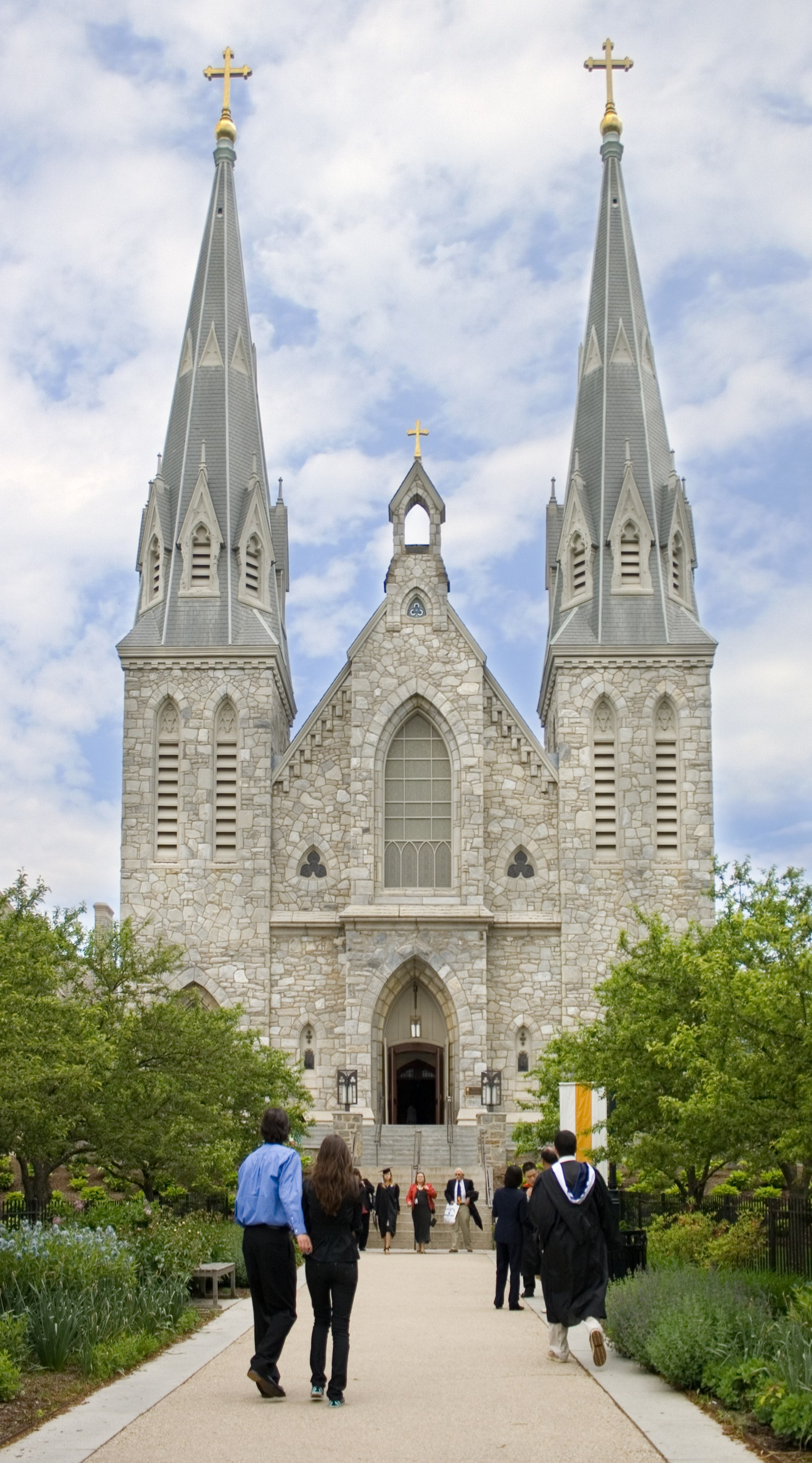
St. Thomas of Villanova Church during the 2008 Villanova University Baccalaureate.

A baccalaureate service (or baccalaureate Mass) is a celebration that honors a graduating class from a college, high school, or middle school. The event is typically a Christianity-based interdenominational (ecumenical) service, though it may also be conducted with a particular tradition's liturgy, especially if the academic institution is affiliated with a certain Christian denomination such as the Catholic Church, Lutheran Church, among others.

The service is held within a couple weeks of the graduation/commencement ceremony, perhaps on a Sunday before, the day preceding, or immediately preceding the graduation. Speakers selected tend to be community leaders, faculty members, students, or local religious leaders, and may be elected by the graduating class. Speeches are often intermixed with musical performances, drama, and worship. A modern-day Baccalaureate address generally lasts less than half an hour. In ancient times they could last as long as four hours.

The term baccalaureate may also be applied to similar, graduation-related events at some American high schools, such as presentations of awards and scholarships.

== History ==
A claim much repeated is that "the baccalaureate service is believed to have originated at the University of Oxford in 1432 when each bachelor was required to deliver a sermon in Latin as part of his academic requirements." However, it was "examinatory sermons" that were required of all Oxford bachelors before their "inception" or commencement; these were mentioned in a 1311 statute. The American baccalaureate service is an outgrowth of the baccalaureate sermon. The earliest known held in the United States is at the College of New Jersey (now Princeton University) in 1760.

Because of United States Supreme Court rulings such as Lee v. Weisman (1992) regarding the separation of church and state at public school graduation ceremonies, baccalaureate services are usually unofficial, school-sponsored events at American public schools. However, many have student-initiated services at private facilities not paid for with government funds, and as such are fully permitted by law. School-sponsored baccalaureate services for American public schools, on school grounds, occur rarely, though private schools affiliated with a denomination often hold them in the school's chapel.
