= Woodcrest (Radnor Township, Delaware County, Pennsylvania) =

Historic house in Pennsylvania, United States

- U.S. National Register of Historic Places
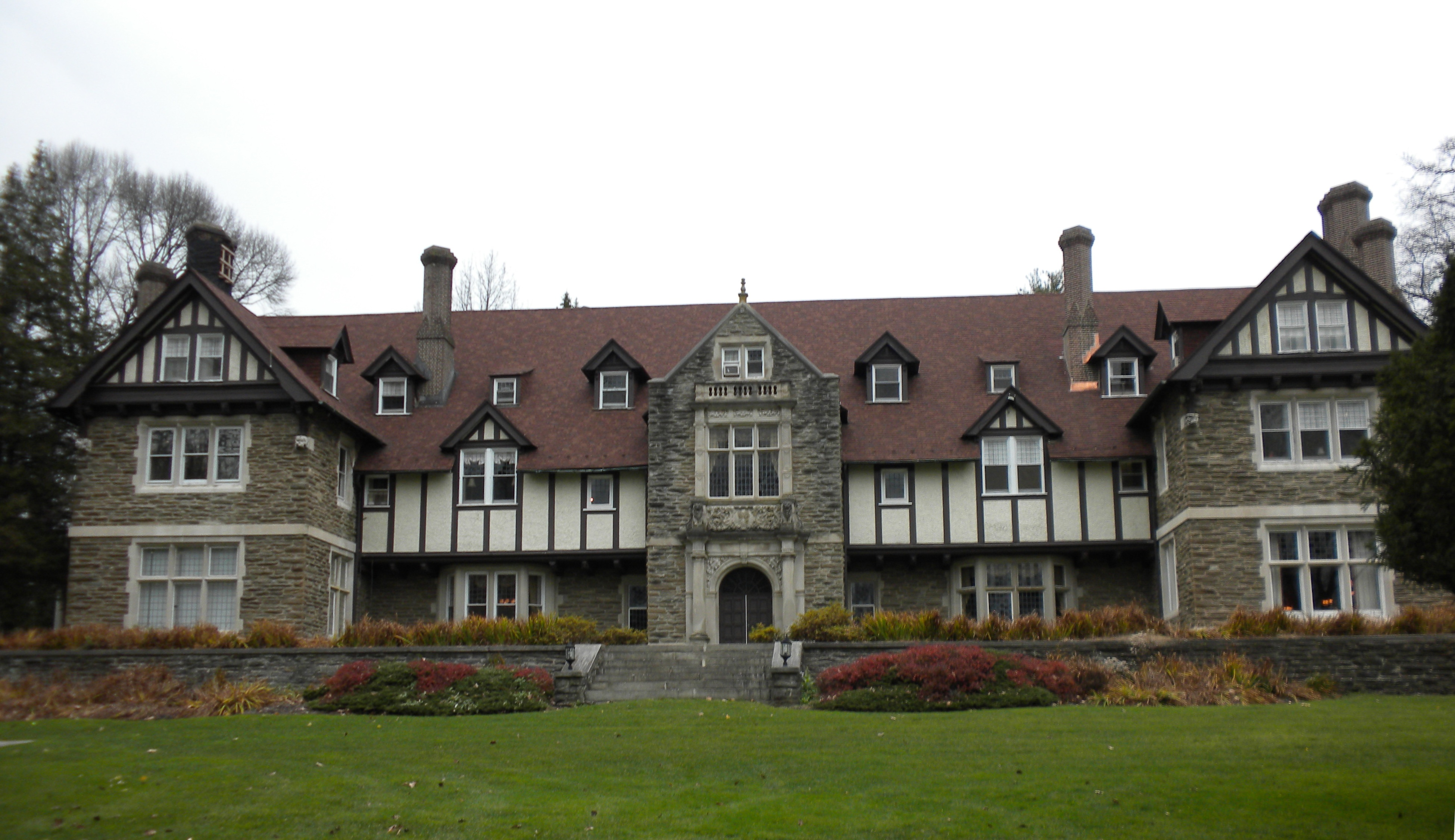
- Woodcrest, November 2009

- Location within Pennsylvania Location within the United States
- Location: 610 King of Prussia Rd., Radnor Township, Pennsylvania
- Coordinates: 40°3′13″N 75°22′39″W
- Area: 2.8 acres (1.1 ha)
- Built: 1901, 1907
- Architect: Trumbauer, Horace
- Architectural style: Tudor Revival
- NRHP reference No.: 08001265
- Added to NRHP: December 30, 2008

Woodcrest Mansion is an historic mansion in Radnor Township, Delaware County, Pennsylvania, United States.

It was added to the National Register of Historic Places in 2008.

== History and architectural features ==
Designed by renowned architect Horace Trumbauer for James W. Paul, a managing partner in Drexel and Company Banking (now JPMorgan Chase), it was one of the oldest buildings on the campus of Cabrini University, where it served as the main administration building from 1957 to 2024 when it ceased to exist and was acquired by Villanova University. It was originally built in 1901; major renovations and additions were then undertaken almost immediately and continued through 1907, with additional modifications executed in 1914.

This historic mansion is a three-story, fifty-one-room, 47,000-square-foot building that was created in the Elizabethan Tudor Revival style. It was once part of a 238-acre estate, 112 acres of which later became Cabrini University.

Administrators of the estate of Dr. John T. Dorrance, inventor of the process for condensed soup and president of the Campbell Soup Company, sold this property to the Missionary Sisters of the Sacred Heart of Jesus in 1953. Cabrini University (then called Cabrini College) subsequently opened on the grounds of that former estate in September 1957. Woodcrest served as its first home.
