= Downtown Wayne Historic District =

Historic district in Pennsylvania, United States

- U.S. National Register of Historic Places
- U.S. Historic district
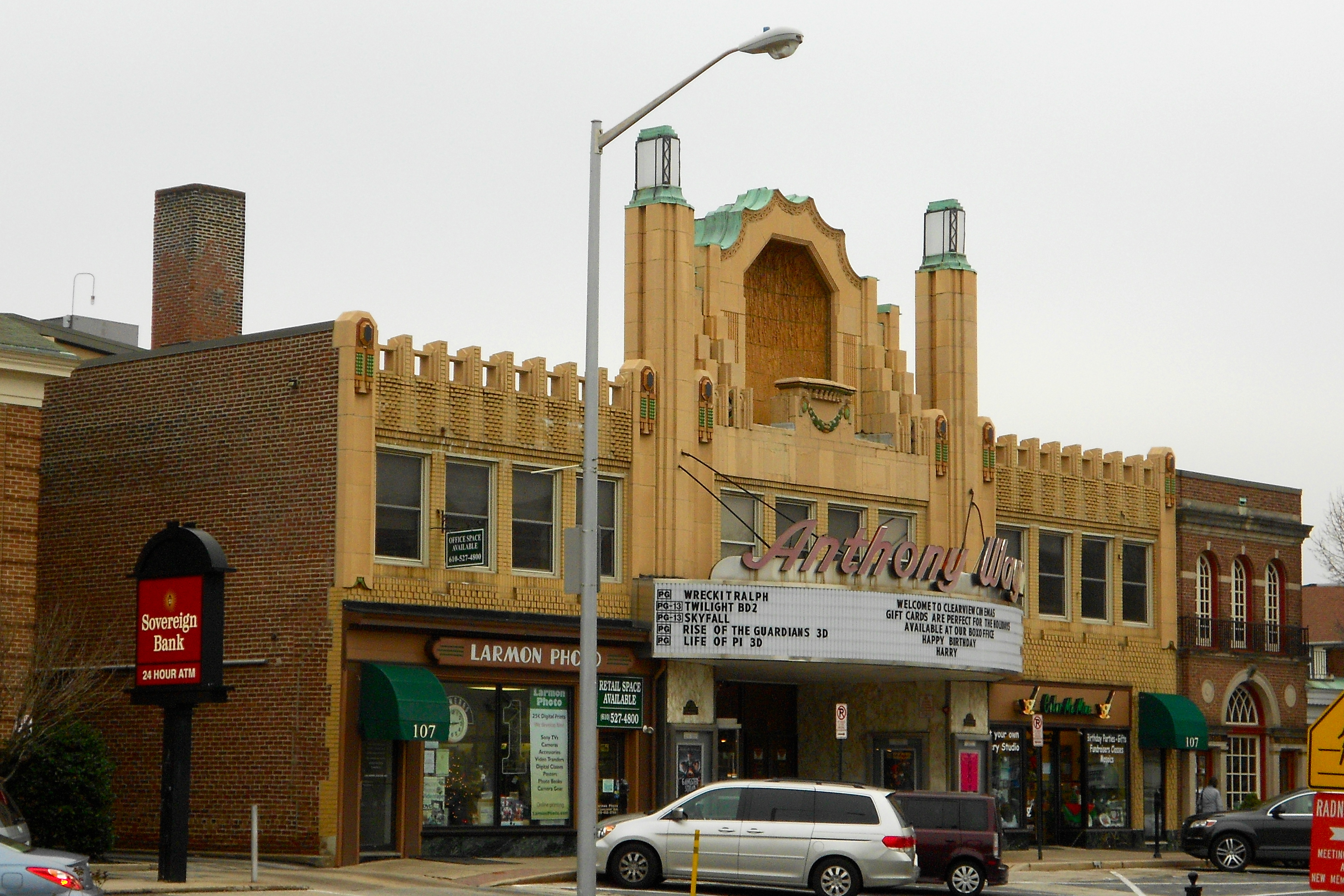
- Wayne Theater, Downtown Wayne Historic District, December 2012

- Location within Pennsylvania Location within the United States
- Location: Roughly bounded by Louella Ct., West Ave., and S. Wayne Ave., at Wayne, Radnor Township, Pennsylvania
- Coordinates: 40°02′41″N 75°23′07″W
- Built: c. 1864
- Architectural style: Italian Renaissance
- NRHP reference No.: 12000607
- Added to NRHP: September 5, 2012

Downtown Wayne Historic District is a national historic district located at Radnor Township, Delaware County, Pennsylvania. The district includes approximately 100 resources.

It was added to the National Register of Historic Places in 2012.
