= Camp-Woods =

Historic house in Pennsylvania, United States

- U.S. National Register of Historic Places
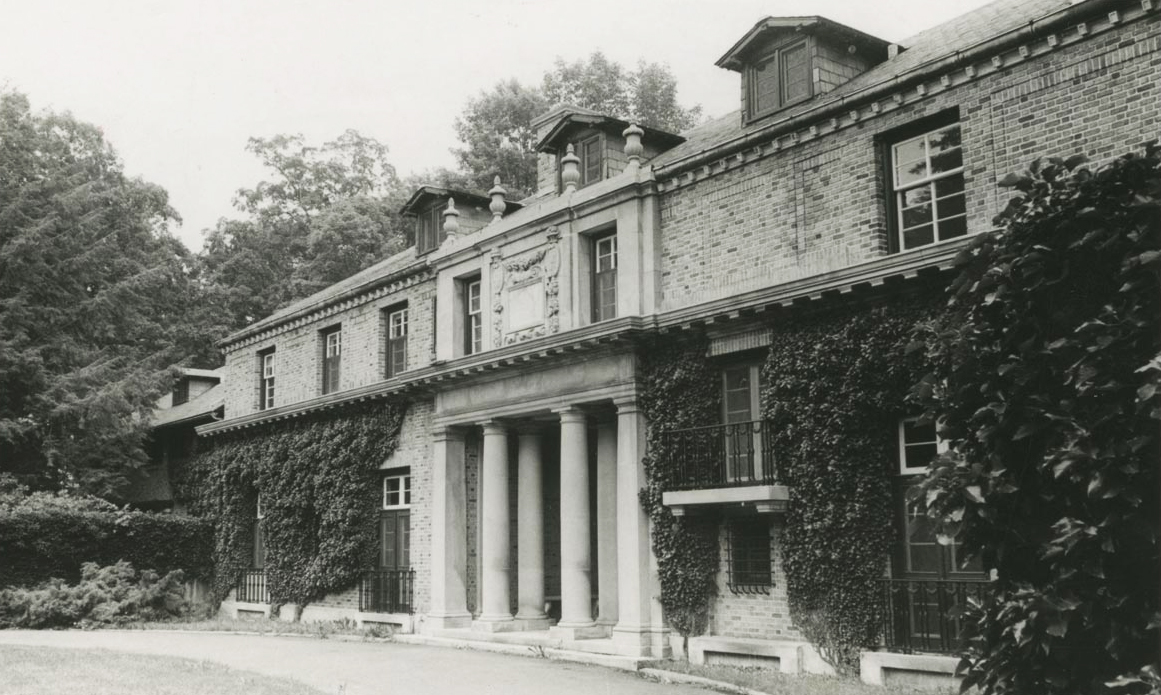
- Camp-Woods, 1962

- Location within Pennsylvania Location within the United States
- Location: 745 Newtown Rd., Villanova, Pennsylvania
- Coordinates: 40°1′15″N 75°21′46″W
- Area: 4.2 acres (1.7 ha)
- Built: 1910-1912
- Architect: John S. Cornell & Sons; Howard Van Doren Shaw
- Architectural style: Italianate, Georgian
- NRHP reference No.: 83002239
- Added to NRHP: September 1, 1983

Camp-Woods, is a historic estate with associated buildings located at Villanova, Delaware County, Pennsylvania and built on a 400 ft (120 m) high spot which had been a 200-man outpost of George Washington's Army during the Valley Forge winter of 1777–78. The house, built between 1910 and 1912 for banker James M. Willcox, is a two-story, brick and limestone, F-shaped house in an Italianate-Georgian style. It measures 160 ft (49 m) in length and 32 ft (9.8 m) deep at the "waist." It has a slate roof, Doric order limestone cornice, open loggia porches, and a covered entrance porch supported by Doric order columns. The house was designed by architect Howard Van Doren Shaw (1869-1926). The property includes formal gardens. Its former carriage house is no longer part of the main estate. The original tennis court is now also a separate property named "Outpost Hill". The Revolutionary encampment is marked by a flagpole in a circular stone monument at the north-western edge of the property. The inscription reads, "An outpost of George Washington's Army encamped here thro the winter of Valley Forge 1777-1778".

The Camp-Woods mansion was added to the National Register of Historic Places in 1983.

== Gallery ==
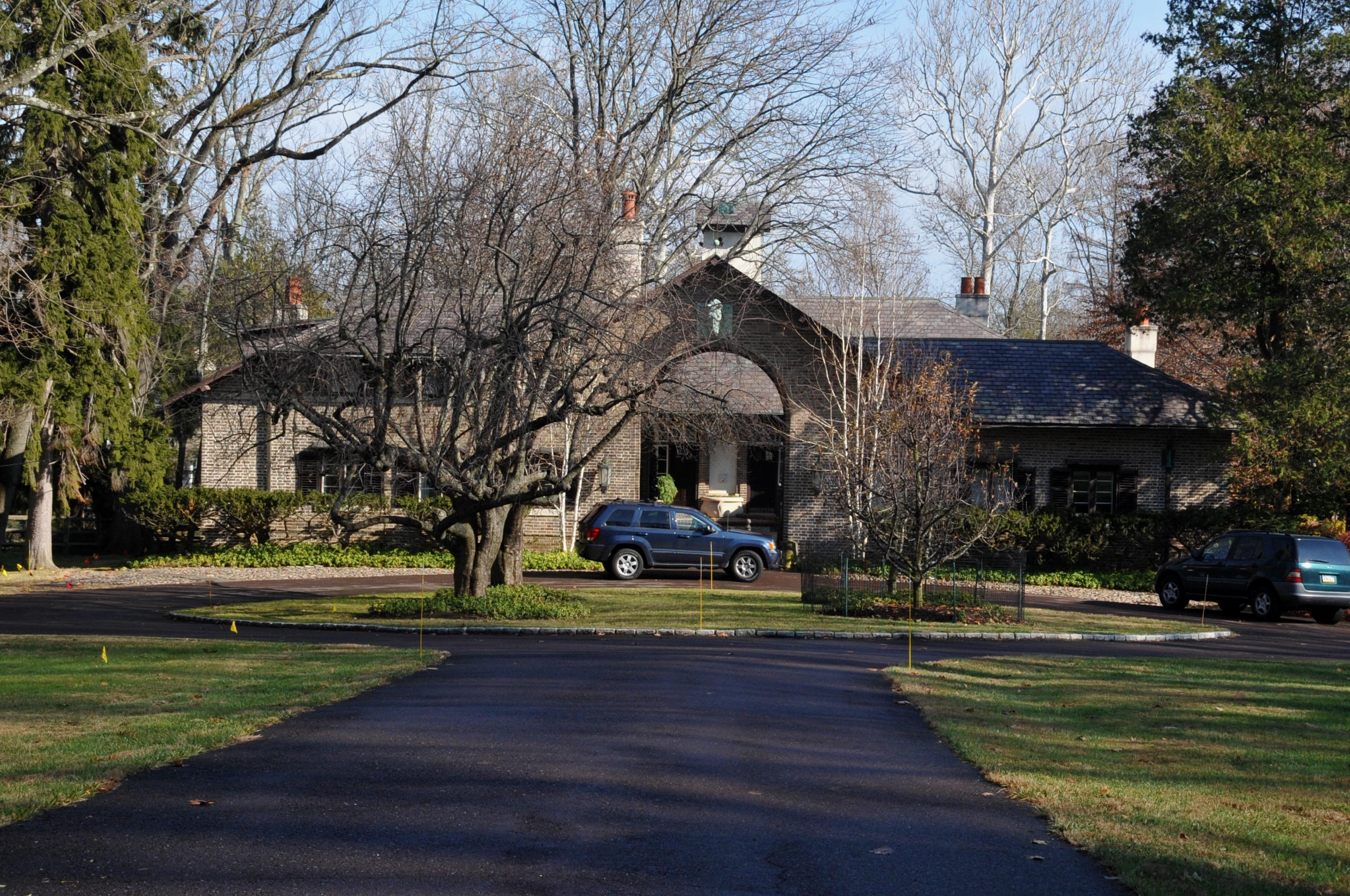
Former Carriage House to Camp-Woods - 741 Newtown Rd

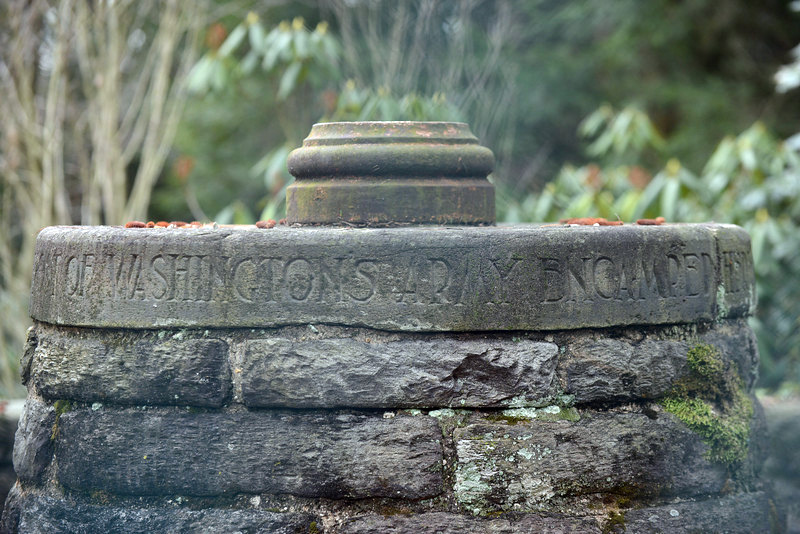
Monument at Camp Woods
