= Radnor Friends Meetinghouse =

Historic church in Pennsylvania, United States

- U.S. National Register of Historic Places
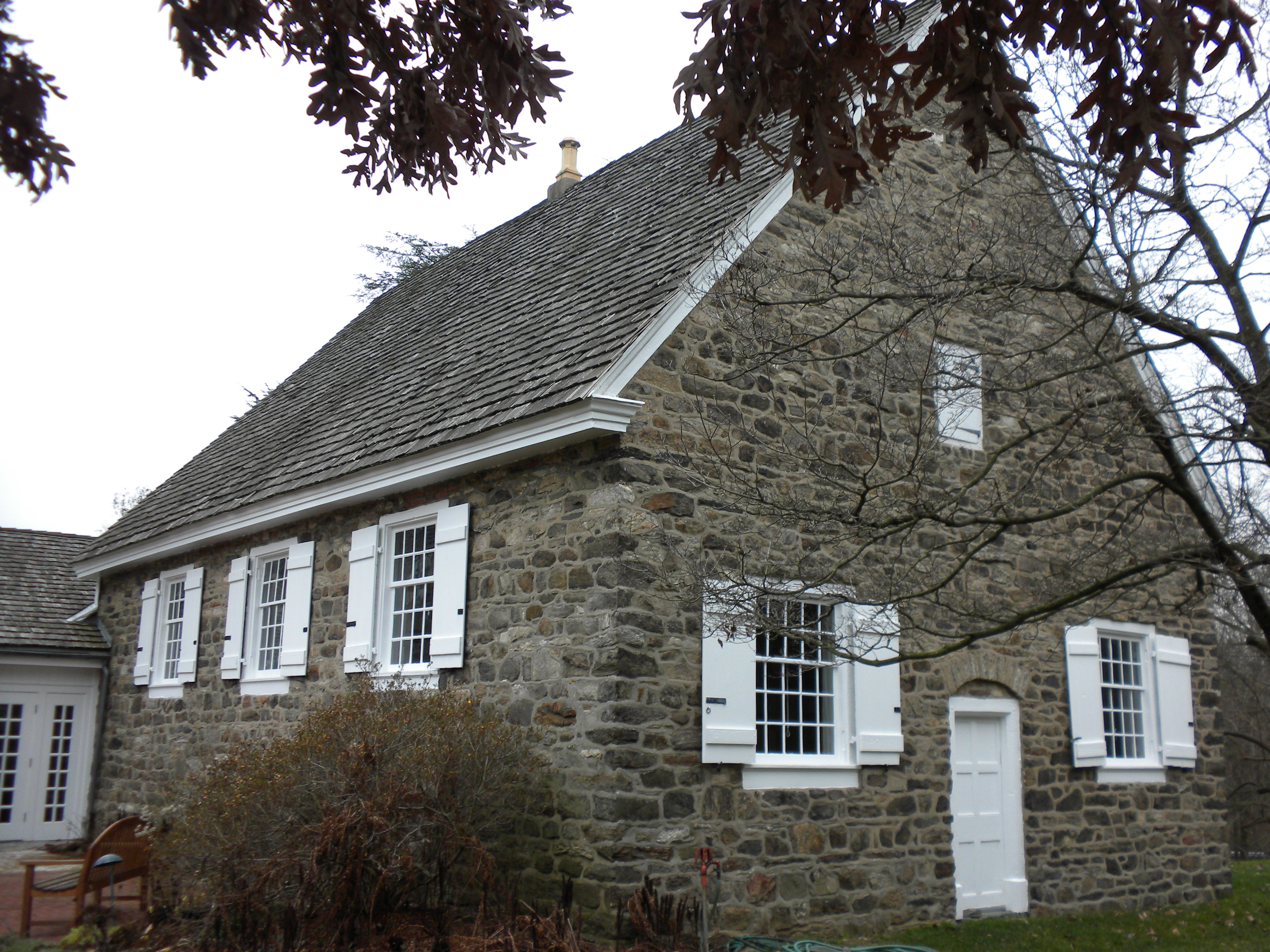
- Radnor Friends Meetinghouse in November 2009

- Location within Pennsylvania Location within the United States
- Location: Sproul and Conestoga Rds., Ithan, Pennsylvania
- Coordinates: 40°1′48″N 75°21′53″W
- Area: 0.1 acres (0.040 ha)
- Built: 1717
- NRHP reference No.: 78002393
- Added to NRHP: August 31, 1978

The Radnor Friends Meetinghouse is an historic Quaker meeting house that is located on Sproul and Conestoga Roads in Radnor Township, Delaware County, Pennsylvania, United States.

The meeting house was added to the National Register of Historic Places in 1978.

== History and architectural features ==
In 1686, there were sufficient number of Friends in Radnor township to begin meetings at the house of John Jerman, a Quaker minister.

The current meeting house was built in 1717 with an addition made several years later. An earlier meeting house existed on the site as early as 1693. During the Revolutionary War, the meeting house was used as an outpost for General George Washington's Continental Army.

Worship services are held weekly at 10 a.m.

== See also ==
- National Register of Historic Places listings in Delaware County, Pennsylvania
