= Bridge in Radnor Township No. 2 =

- U.S. National Register of Historic Places
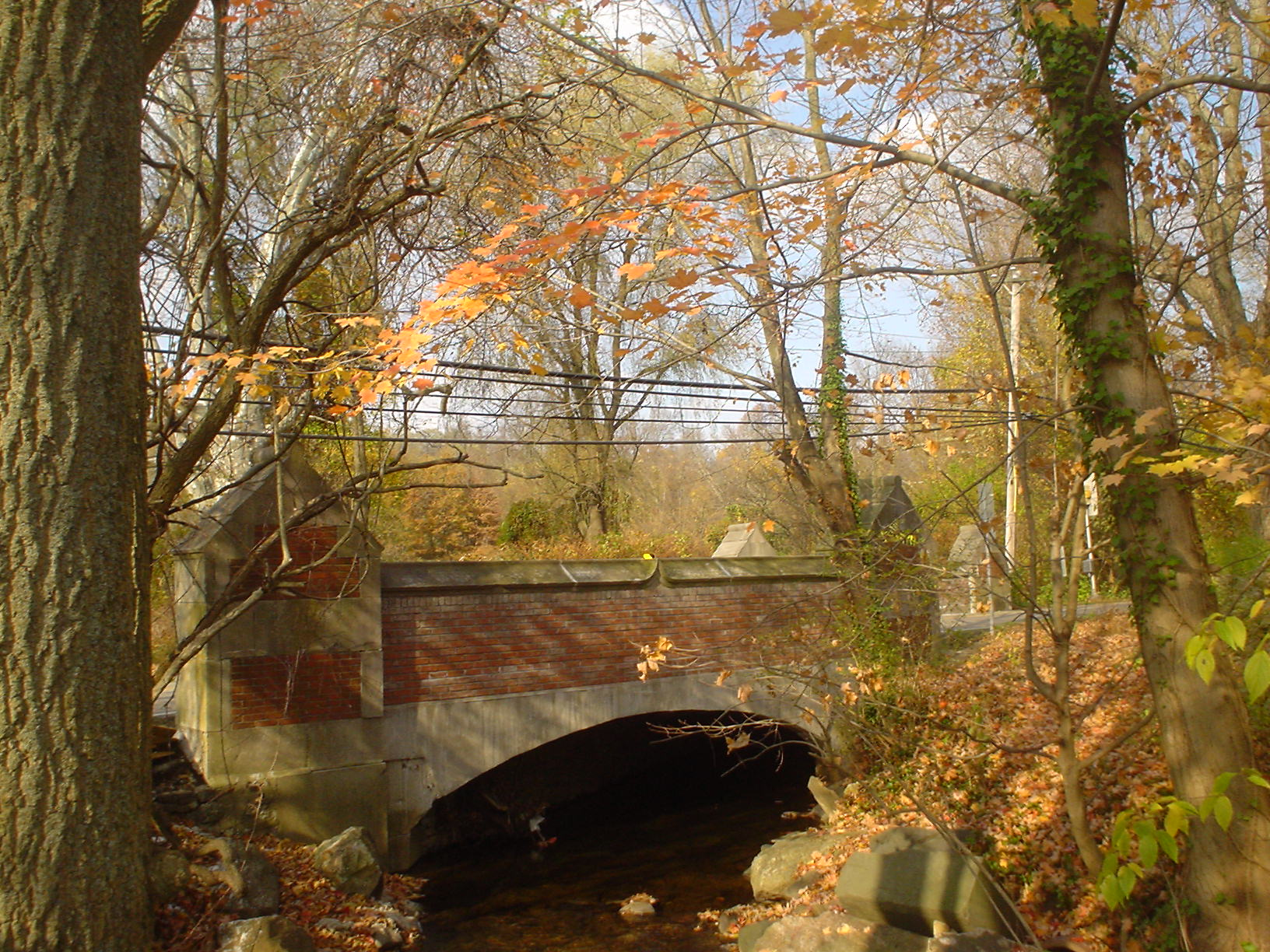
- Bridge No. 2 in Radnor Township, November 2009

- Location within Pennsylvania Location within the United States
- Location: Bryn Mawr Avenue over Meadowbrook Run, Villanova, Pennsylvania, U.S.
- Coordinates: 40°0′41″N 75°20′39″W
- Area: less than one acre
- Built: 1905
- Architectural style: Gothic, Single span stone arch
- MPS: Highway Bridges Owned by the Commonwealth of Pennsylvania, Department of Transportation TR
- NRHP reference No.: 88000784
- Added to NRHP: June 22, 1988

Bridge in Radnor Township No. 2 is a historic brick and concrete arch bridge located in Villanova, Pennsylvania. It was built in 1905, and is a 75-foot-long (23 m), arch bridge with a single arch with a 10-foot-long (3.0 m) span. It features an ornate parapet cap. It spans Meadowbrook Run.

It was listed on the National Register of Historic Places in 1988.
