= Villanova, Pennsylvania =

Unincorporated community in Pennsylvania, US

Villanova
- Census-designated place and unincorporated community
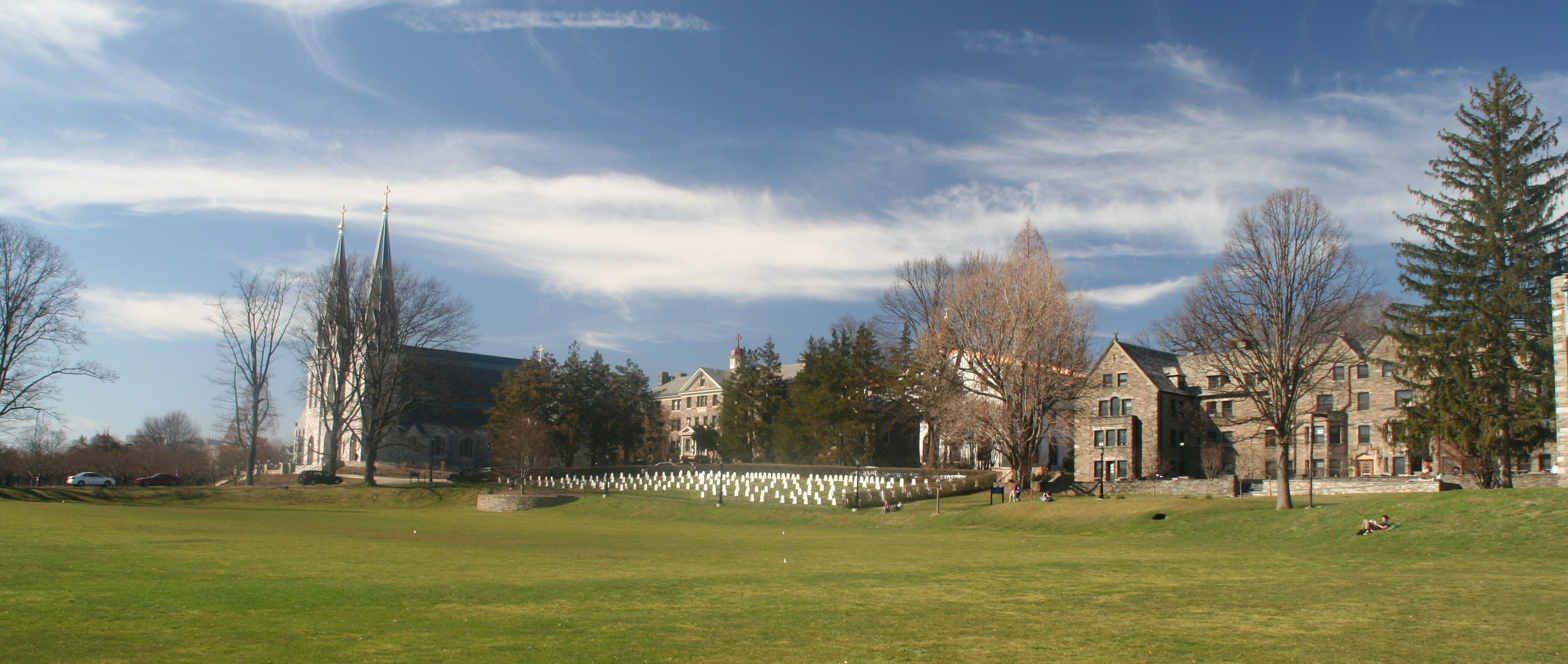
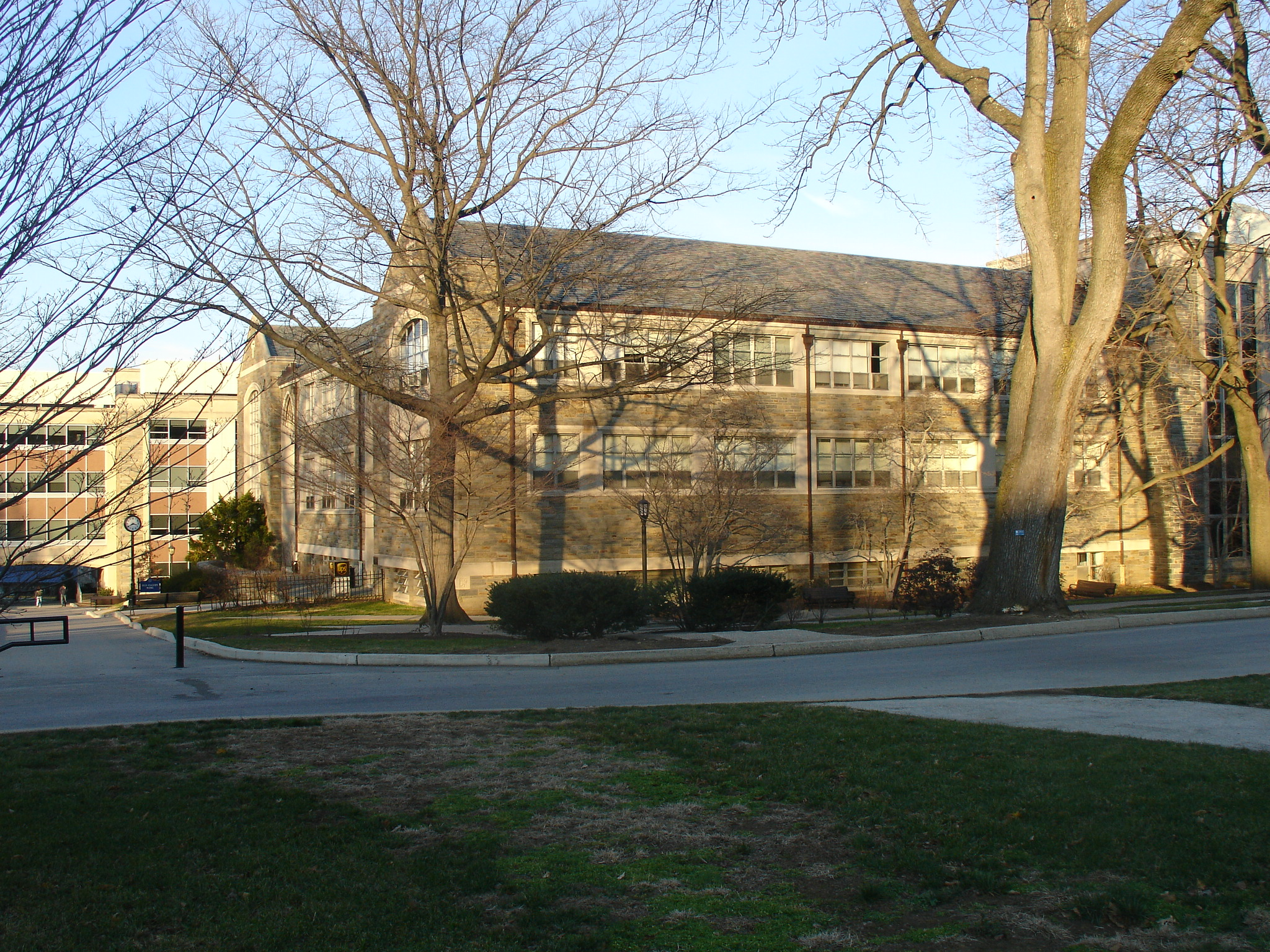
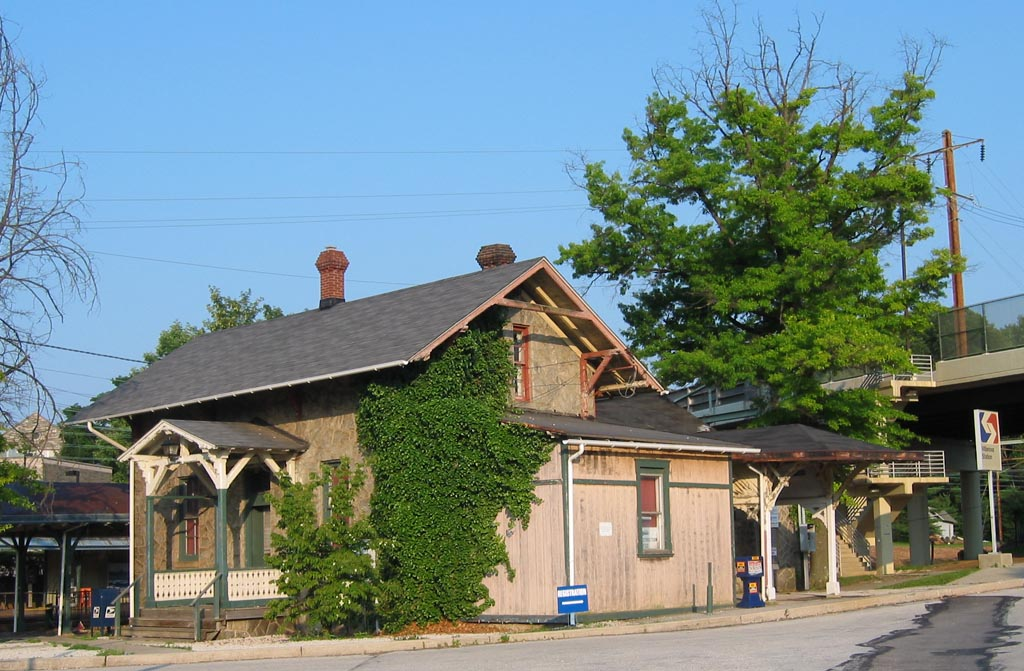
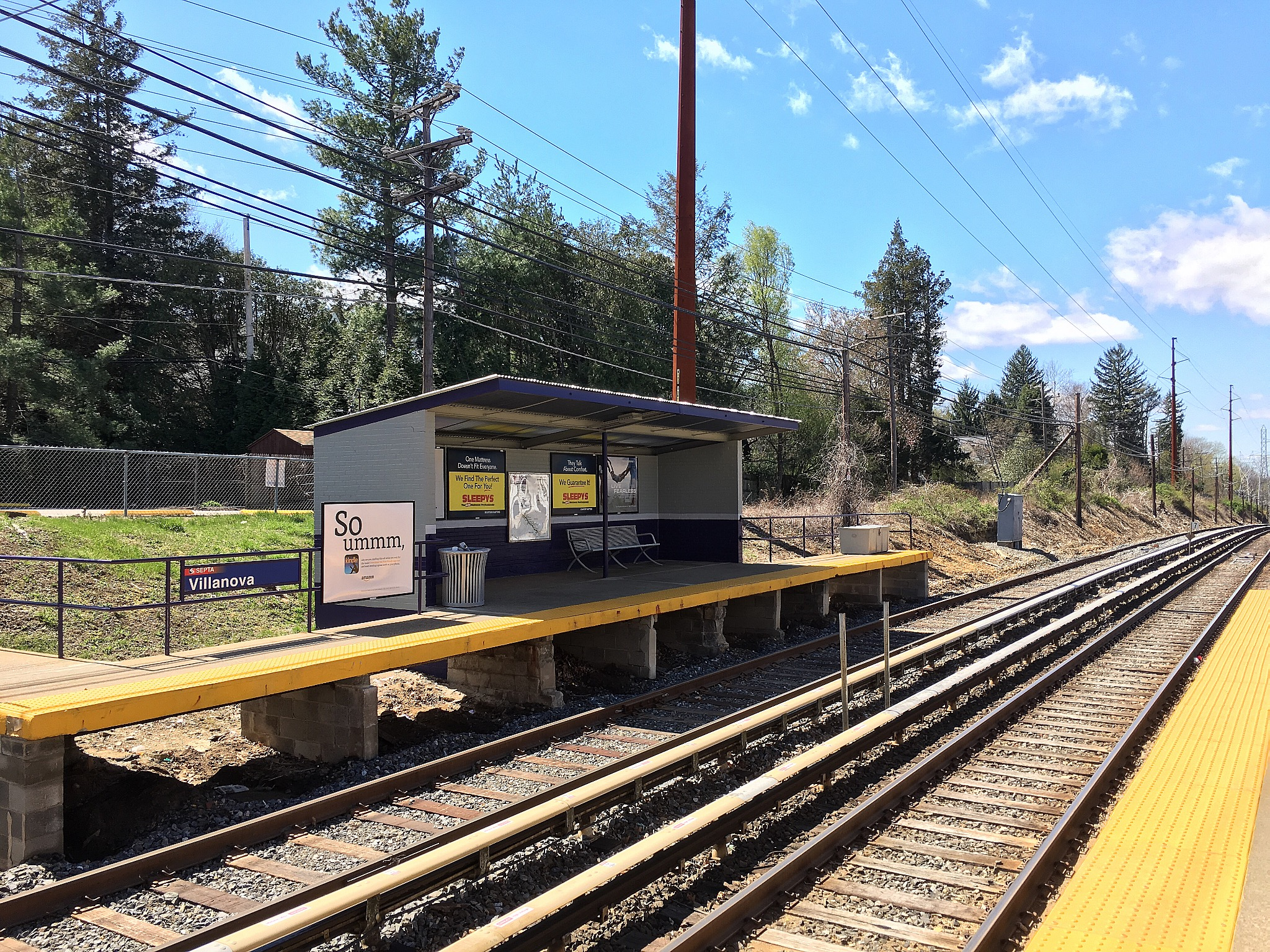
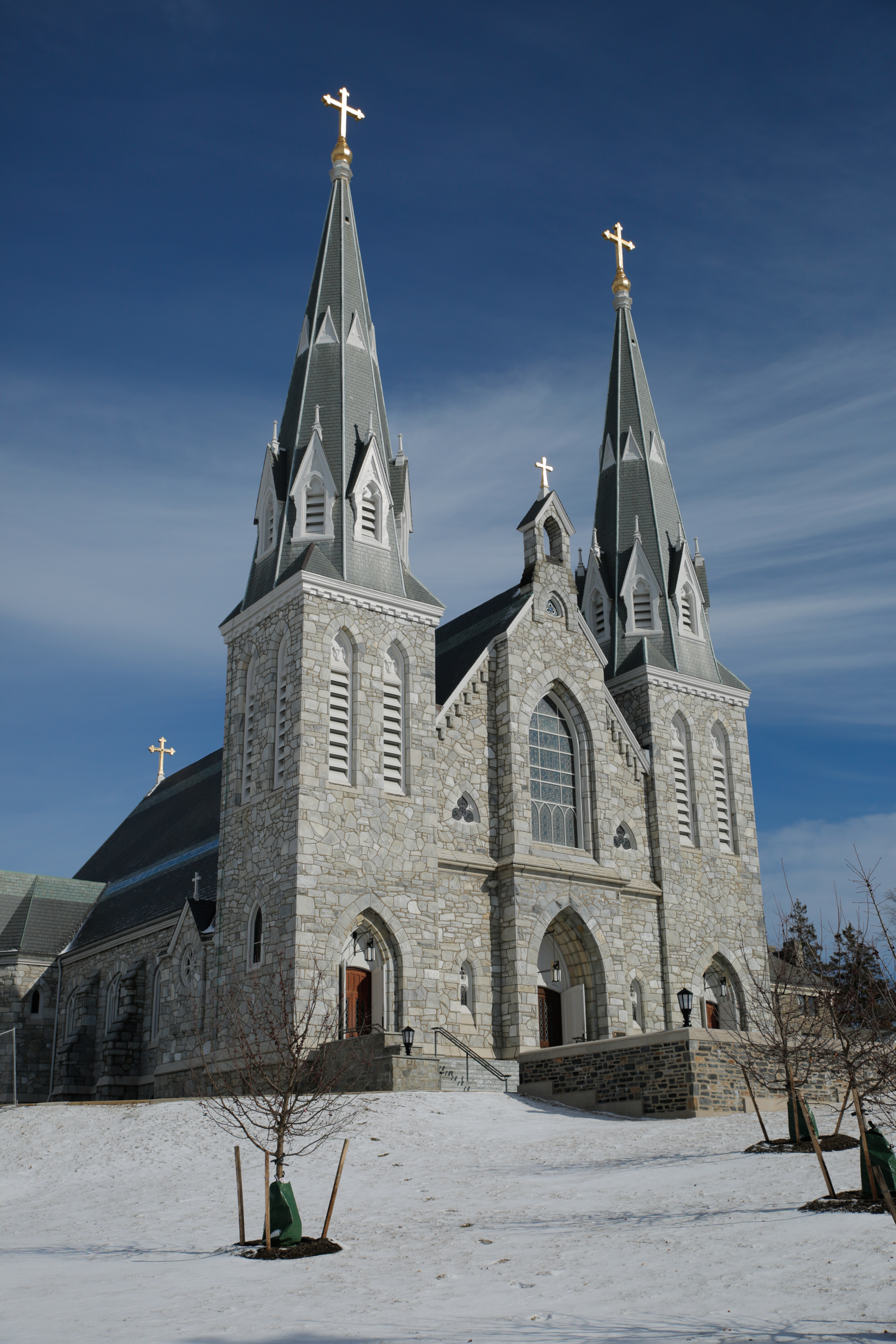
- Villanova University Falvey Library SEPTA Regional Rail station SEPTA NHSL station St. Thomas of Villanova Church

- Location of Villanova in Pennsylvania Villanova (the United States)
- Coordinates: 40°02′14″N 75°20′57″W
- Country: United States
- State: Pennsylvania
- Counties: Delaware; Montgomery
- Townships: Lower Merion; Radnor
- Elevation: 466 ft (142 m)

Population (2020)
  - Total: 8,213
- Time zone: UTC-5 (EST)
  - Summer (DST): UTC-4 (EDT)
- ZIP Code: 19085
- Area codes: 610 and 484
- GNIS feature ID: 2812905

Villanova is census-designated place in Pennsylvania, United States. A suburb of Philadelphia, the community straddles the border of Lower Merion Township in Montgomery County and Radnor Township in Delaware County. It is located at the center of the Philadelphia Main Line, a series of Philadelphia suburbs located along the original east–west railroad tracks of the Pennsylvania Railroad. It is served by the SEPTA Paoli/Thorndale Line regional rail train and the Norristown High Speed Line.

The center of the village straddles U.S. Route 30 (Lancaster Avenue) where it intersects Pennsylvania Route 320 (Spring Mill Road). This village center contains the area's post office for ZIP Code 19085, an office building, the Wilmington Trust Company's Pennsylvania headquarters, and several smaller shops.

It was first listed as a CDP in the 2020 census with a population of 8,213.

== History ==
The Bridge in Radnor Township No. 2 and Camp-Woods are listed on the National Register of Historic Places.

== Geography ==
=== Climate ===
Villanova has a hot-summer humid continental climate (Dfa) and average monthly temperatures range from 30.9 °F in January to 75.6 °F in July. The local hardiness zone is 7a.

== Demographics ==
Historical population
| Census | Pop. | Note | %± |
|---|---|---|---|
| 2020 | 8,213 | | — |
U.S. Decennial Census; 2020

=== 2020 census ===
Villanova CDP, Pennsylvania – Racial and ethnic composition Note: the US Census treats Hispanic/Latino as an ethnic category. This table excludes Latinos from the racial categories and assigns them to a separate category. Hispanics/Latinos may be of any race.
| Race / Ethnicity (NH = Non-Hispanic) | Pop 2020 | % 2020 |
|---|---|---|
| White alone (NH) | 6,668 | 81.19% |
| Black or African American alone (NH) | 417 | 5.08% |
| Native American or Alaska Native alone (NH) | 12 | 0.15% |
| Asian alone (NH) | 796 | 9.69% |
| Native Hawaiian or Pacific Islander alone (NH) | 10 | 0.12% |
| Other race alone (NH) | 13 | 0.16% |
| Mixed race or Multiracial (NH) | 115 | 1.40% |
| Hispanic or Latino (any race) | 182 | 2.22% |
| Total | 8,213 | 100.00% |

Prior to 2020, Villanova was neither an incorporated area nor a census-designated place. Using data for ZIP code 19085, per the census of 2000, there were 9,189 people and 1,932 households residing in the community. The population density was 1,565 people per square mile. The racial makeup of the community was 92.5% White, 3.4% Asian, 3.9% African American, 1.40% from other races, and 0.80% from two or more races. 2.5% of the population were Hispanic or Latino of any race.

The median income for a household in the community was $159,538, and the median income for a family was $174,511. The per capita income for the community was $50,204. About 1.5% of families and 3.0% of the population were below the poverty line. The estimated median house/condo value in 2009 is $1,435,844.

== Education ==
=== Colleges ===
The most notable feature of Villanova is Villanova University, from which the community gains its name. The university campus extends from County Line Road along Spring Mill Road south to Lancaster Pike, US Route 30, and then east to just beyond Villanova Stadium, home of the Villanova University football, men's and women's lacrosse, women's field hockey and men's and women's track teams. The university's indoor arena, Finneran Pavilion, is home to the school's NCAA Division I 1985, 2016, and 2018 national champion men's basketball teams. In addition to the undergraduate college, Villanova University includes a well-recognized graduate school, a nursing school, a school of continuing studies, numerous certificate programs, and Villanova University Law School.

=== Schools ===
Public school children in Villanova who live in Radnor Township are in the Radnor Township School District. They attend Radnor Elementary School in Radnor, Radnor Middle School in Wayne, and Radnor High School in St. Davids.

Children who live in the Lower Merion Township portion of Villanova are in the Lower Merion School District. As of 2024 school zoning is as follows: Gladwyne Elementary School in Gladwyne, Black Rock Middle School in Villanova, and Harriton High School in Rosemont.

Other private schools in the area include the all-boys Haverford School, located in nearby Haverford and the Episcopal Academy called among locals as "EA" in Newtown Square. There are several all-girls schools in Bryn Mawr, including the Baldwin School, the Agnes Irwin School, the Country Day School of the Sacred Heart, and the Academy of Notre Dame de Namur, as well as the coeducational Shipley School. Rosemont School of the Holy Child on Montgomery Avenue is a nearby Catholic grade school.

== Infrastructure ==
=== Hospitals ===
Bryn Mawr Hospital, at South Bryn Mawr Avenue and Haverford Road, is one of the three nationally ranked community teaching hospitals that serve the Main Line; it is located less than one mile (1.6 km) from the Villanova district line. The hospital has historically been associated with Philadelphia's Jefferson Medical College for many years. Bryn Mawr Hospital is the chief beneficiary of the area's preeminent social and sporting event, the Devon Horse Show and Country Fair, which is held annually during the last week of May at the fairgrounds in Devon.

== Notable people ==
- Kevin Brennan – stand-up comedian and writer
- Neal Brennan – comedian, writer, director, producer, actor
- Colby Cohen (born 1989) – ice hockey player
- Fran Dunphy – Temple University men's basketball coach
- Julius Erving (Dr. J) – former NBA star
- Albert Eugene Gallatin (1881-1952) – artist and art collector
- Jim Gardner – television news anchor
- Courtlandt S. Gross (1904 - 1982) - aviation pioneer and executive
- Jon Ritchie – former NFL fullback and co-host of the 94.1 WIP Morning Show
- Conyers Read – historian
- Michael Smerconish – broadcaster, journalist, author
- Will Smith – actor
- Brian Westbrook – former NFL running back
- Robert Francis Prevost (Pope Leo XIV)- 267th Pope of the Catholic Church
- Jack Whitaker - former CBS golf reporter and announcer
- Dan Wigrizer - former college lacrosse player

== Points of interest ==
- Villanova University
- Appleford/Parsons-Banks Arboretum
- Arboretum Villanova
- Friends of the Willows Cottage
- Stoneleigh: A Natural Garden
