= St. Thomas of Villanova Church =

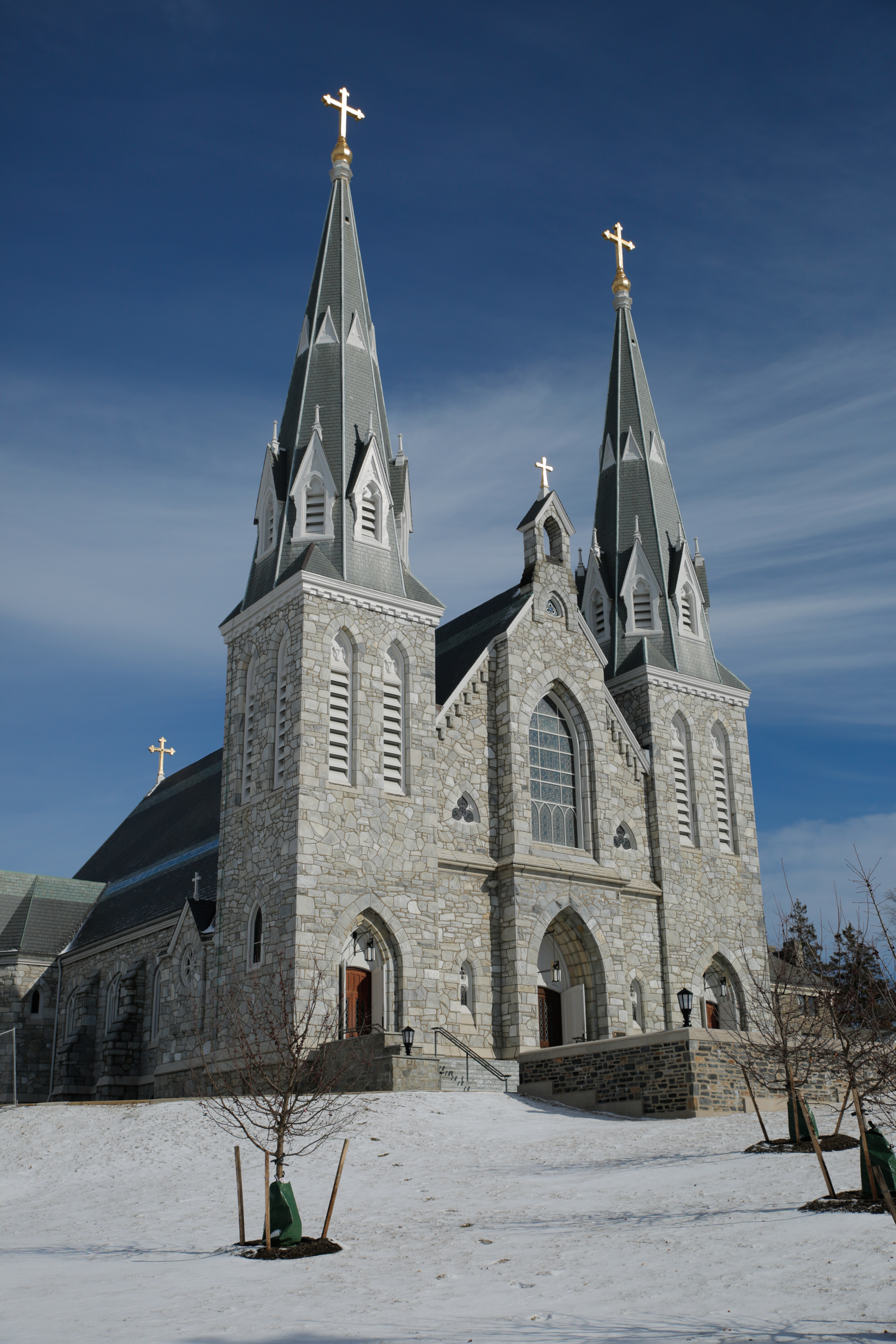
- St. Thomas of Villanova Church; January, 2018
- St. Thomas of Villanova Church
- 40.0360°N 75.3433°W
- Location: Villanova, Pennsylvania
- Country: United States
- Denomination: Roman Catholic
- Website: www.stthomasofvillanova.org

History
- Status: Parish church University Chapel
- Founded: October 13, 1841
- Dedication: Thomas of Villanova

Architecture
- Architect: Edwin F. Durang
- Style: Gothic revival
- Groundbreaking: March 29, 1883
- Completed: 1887

Administration
- Diocese: Philadelphia
- Parish: St. Thomas of Villanova Parish; Rosemont, Pennsylvania

Clergy
- Pastor(s): Fr. Joseph Genito, OSA

St. Thomas of Villanova Church is a Catholic church on the campus of Villanova University in Villanova, Pennsylvania. Completed in 1887, it had long been the center of Augustinian activity in the United States, and still plays an important role within the order's local province. Today, the church functions as a parish church as well as the university chapel. The church's dual Gothic revival spires have long been symbolic of the university.

== History ==
The land on which the church and school sit was purchased from the Rudolph family by the Augustinians on October 13, 1841. The intent was to create a center of Augustinian life; an organized program of education for the priesthood, which became Villanova University; and an academy for Catholic boys, which now exists as Malvern Preparatory School. In 1843, Villanova College opened its doors for its first few classes, becoming the center of Augustinian life in the United States, a position it would retain for over 70 years.

Ground was broken for the church on March 29, 1883. The cornerstone was laid on June 3, 1883, and blessed by Jeremiah F. Shanahan, Bishop of Harrisburg. The building project was begun under the leadership of the Augustinian provincial, Fr. Christopher McEvoy, O.S.A. along with the pastor, prior, and president of Villanova College, Fr. Joseph A. Coleman, O.S.A. The church was completed in 1887 under Reverend James J. Blake, O.S.A.

The architect of the Gothic Revival church, Edwin F. Durang of the Philadelphia architectural firm of John E. Carver, based the 137 feet (42 m) twin spires of the church on the south spire of the 13th century French cathedral at Chartres. With no known claim to the contrary, it is assumed that, at the time of its construction, the church's spires were the tallest man-made structure between the Delaware River and Lancaster.

Fr. Thomas Middleton, an Augustinian historian, states in his 1893 account of the building of the church that Durang designed the building "façade with two towers, each 18 square feet and 63 feet high, surmounted by eight-sided spires.... Durang created a European-like interior, measuring 60 feet in breadth and 143 ½ feet in length, exclusive of the sacristy, [which includes a] prolongation of the sanctuary, terminating in a large deep apsidal choir for the use of the religious.... The interior woodwork is all of oak including the pews and the stalls in the choir for the fraternity. The choir is divided by six clustered columns supporting groined arches. The side aisles of the nave are divided into six bays, each 15 square feet, also with groined ceiling."

The original church contained seven altars: four for the congregation, one in the side chapel of Our Lady of Good Counsel, and the other two in the retro choir. Standing in the center of the sacristy, the main altar was made of Italian polished marble with Indiana stone filigree screen. The altar had two tables and double tabernacles, one facing the congregation, and the other choir. It was not unusual for two masses to be said simultaneously. However, as the number of congregants increased, the filigree screen was removed to enable all to see the service.

The church's interior was originally very ornate, in keeping with the taste of the times, including faux marble, gilded columns and walls, and large oil painted murals of "The Assumption of St. Joseph" and "Our Mother of Good Counsel". The seven-sectioned dome in the apse contained life-sized paintings in distemper of St. Thomas of Villanova, St. Augustine and St. Patrick, and oval medallions containing busts of the Four Evangelists. Deterioration caused these dome paintings to be replaced in the 1940s.

=== First Renovation ===
In preparation for the 1943 centennial of Villanova University, a major renovation of the church was authorized by Augustinian Provincial, Reverend Fr. Sheehan, O.S.A. The décor of the church was changed and simplified, being repainted in tones of ecru and taupe.

In the 1960s, novel liturgical fads posed a significant challenge to churches such as Villanova, as its cruciform design was not easily modified. Fr. Henry Greenlee, O.S.A. oversaw the first significant modifications based on the trends en vogue among liturgists at that time, as he commissioned the installation of a temporary wooden altar which faced the congregation. Later, a permanent, smaller marble altar was installed on a single tier with the marble altar railings removed.

=== Second Renovation ===
While many emergency repairs had been made to the church throughout its existence, none addressed the larger problems of structural reinforcement, electrical updating, climate control, and adequate sound systems. Under the direction of Fr. Anthony Genovese, the parish and university communities commissioned a major renovation in 1992.

Today the church is nearly entirely whitewashed on the interior, and lit by blue stained glass windows. Much of the original decoration has been preserved, although moved to different locations in the parish and campus. The windows enclosing the nave depict the life of St. Augustine.

== Today ==
The church today is the center of religious life of Villanova University and the parish of St. Thomas of Villanova. With Rosemont Chapel in nearby Rosemont, Pennsylvania, the parish hosts four weekend masses for the parishioners and three Sunday night masses for the students at the university, as well as daily masses at Corr Chapel on the university's campus.

The Sunday night student-oriented masses are strengthened by the participation of Villanova University's Pastoral Musicians. The largest music group on campus, Pastoral Musicians boasts over 60 singers in the SATB choir, as well as over a dozen instrumentalists

The church is also a popular site for student weddings, as well as for funerals for prominent members of the university.
