= Radnor Township School District =

School district in Pennsylvania

Address
- 135 South Wayne Avenue Wayne, Pennsylvania, 19087; United States

District information
- Type: Public
- Grades: K–12
- NCES District ID: 4219920

Students and staff
- Students: 3,616 (2023–2024)
- Teachers: 312.55 (on an FTE basis)
- Staff: 377.70 (on an FTE basis)
- Student–teacher ratio: 12.7:1

Other information
- Website: www.rtsd.org

Radnor Township School District is a school district that serves Radnor Township, Pennsylvania and has 3 elementary schools, one middle school, and one high school. Due to the affluent demographic of the Main Line that the Radnor Township School District belongs to, many children attend private schools, often in the Inter-Academic League . Those children who attend the Radnor Township School District generally do so for its reputation as an excellent school district, as it has several blue ribbon schools.

== Schools ==
- Ithan Elementary School
- Wayne Elementary School
- Radnor Elementary School
- Radnor Middle School
- Radnor High School
