= Episcopal Academy =

School in Newtown Square, Pennsylvania, US

Coordinates: 40.006°N 75.425°W

The Episcopal Academy

Location
- 1785 Bishop White Drive; Newtown Square, Pennsylvania 19073; United States

Information
- Type: Private
- Motto: Esse Quam Videri ("To Be Rather than to Seem")
- Religious affiliation: Episcopal Church in the United States of America
- Established: 1785; 241 years ago
- Headmaster: Thomas Joseph (T. J.) Locke
- Faculty: 180
- Gender: Coeducational
- Enrollment: 1,272
- Average class size: 90 students
- Student to teacher ratio: 7:1
- Campus: Suburban
- Colors: Blue and white
- Athletics: 29 varsity teams
- Athletics conference: Inter-Academic League
- Nickname: Churchmen
- Rival: The Haverford School, Malvern Preparatory School, Baldwin School and Agnes Irwin School
- Newspaper: The Academy Scholium
- Website: episcopalacademy.org

The Episcopal Academy, founded in 1785, is a private, co-educational school for grades Pre-K through 12 based in Newtown Square, Pennsylvania. Prior to 2008, the main campus was located in Merion Station and the satellite campus was located in Devon. The Newtown Square facility is on a 123-acre (0.50 km^{2}) campus. The Academy is affiliated with the Episcopal Church.

== History ==
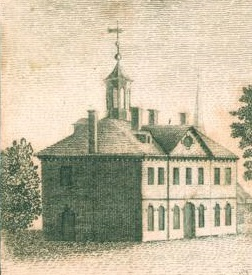
Episcopal Academy in Philadelphia, circa 1790

=== Early years ===
The Episcopal Academy was founded in 1785 by the Rt. Rev. William White at Old Christ Church in Philadelphia as an all-boys school, focusing on classical education in Greek, Latin, religion, mathematics, and business. It was also a pre-missionary school. Trustees included two signers of the Declaration of Independence, as well as bankers, merchants, and ministers. It was founded two years after American Revolutionary War ended.

The faculty was composed of notable figures such as Noah Webster Jr., who developed the Webster Dictionaries. Its first campus was located on the east side of Fourth Street and was directed by Rev. John Andrews, D.D., the Academy's first headmaster. When Dr. Andrews and several of faculty members left in 1798 to teach at the University of Pennsylvania, The Episcopal Academy was reconstituted as a free school. In 1816 it became a Second Classical Academy, and a free school again in 1828. During some years, the Academy did not operate as an educational entity.

In 1846 the school was reconstituted, this time as a Third Classical Academy; it has operated continuously since. In 1850, the school moved to a building at Juniper and Locust streets. It operated there until 1921, when it moved to a new campus in suburban Merion, Pennsylvania, on the Main Line of the commuter railroad.

=== Female students ===
Female students attended the Academy between 1789 and 1818. It was not until 1974 that the academy implemented a gradual plan for permanent co-education at the school. In 1974, girls were admitted to kindergarten, and then to one higher grade each year thereafter. The class of 1984 was the first co-educational class to graduate from the Academy.

=== New campuses ===
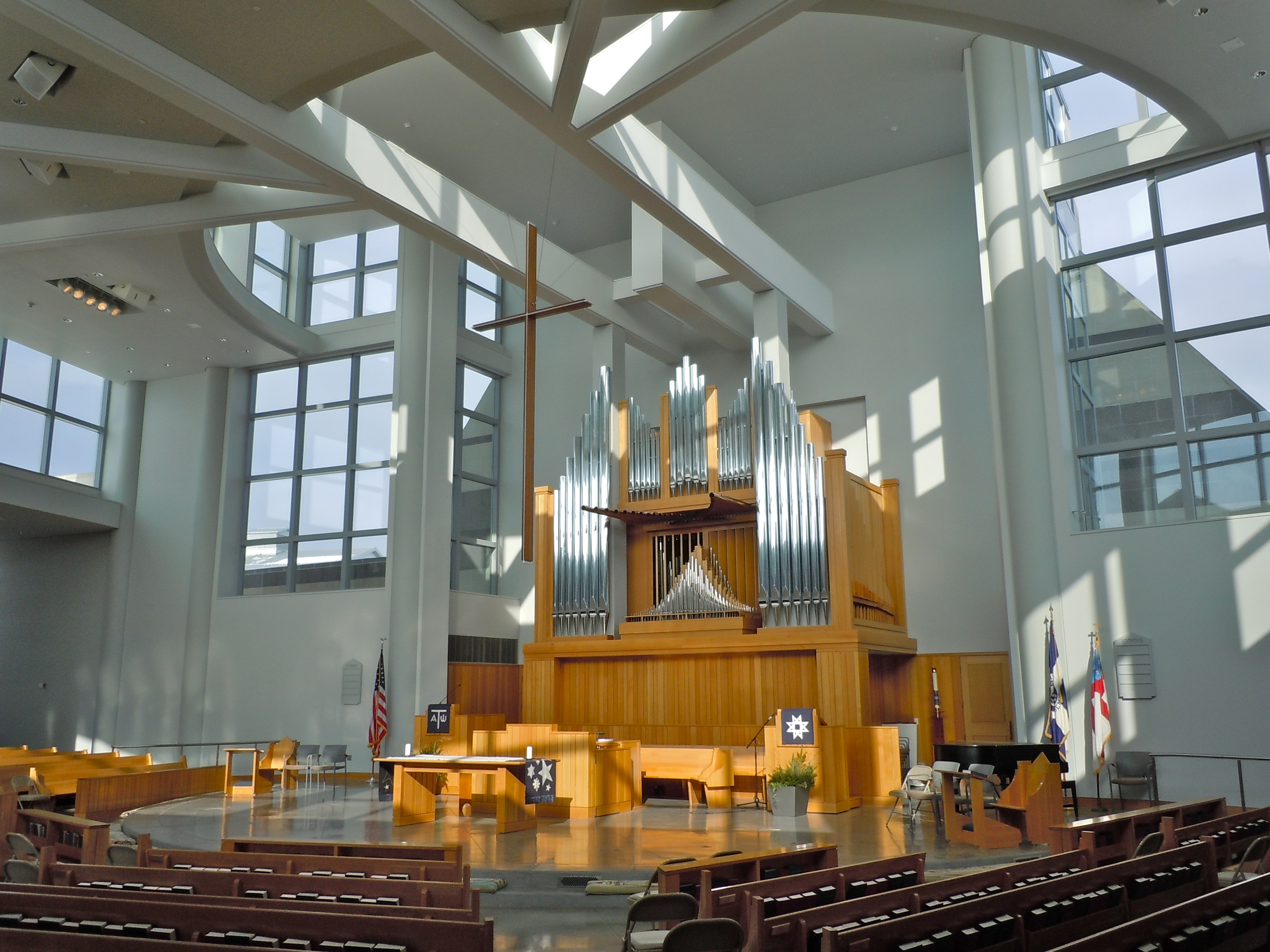
Chapel at the Episcopal Academy

Episcopal Academy was located in Merion, Pennsylvania, from 1921 until 2008, when it moved to Newtown Square, Pennsylvania.

In June 1998, the Episcopal Academy Board of Trustees directed the "active pursuit of a large tract of land in the western suburbs to serve as a long-term asset and a means of preserving future options." After receiving a $20 million donation, the Board purchased a 123-acre (0.50 km^{2}) tract of land in Newtown Square on Darby-Paoli Road (Pennsylvania Route 252).

The $212.5 million project was completed in 2008 and opened for the 2008–2009 school year. The new campus has academic, arts, athletic, and spiritual facilities. It features keepsakes from the Merion and Devon campuses: the original stained glass windows from the Class of 1944 Chapel, a clock (which was installed on the Clark Campus Green), and several artifacts in the Crawford Campus Center.

Brailsford & Dunlavey served as the Academy's on-site program manager throughout each phase of the campus development project. The architecture firms, including Venturi, Scott Brown and Associates, Gund Partnership, Bohlin Cywinski Jackson, and RMJM Hillier, "coordinated the materials used as well as the landscape layout of the campus, with its pastoral central quadrangle and collegiate-village scale".

== Academics ==
The Academy is accredited by the Pennsylvania Association of Independent Schools. The Middle States Association of Colleges and Schools' "Accreditation for Growth" protocol governed accreditation until the current accreditation cycle.

== Athletics ==
The Episcopal Academy is a member of the Inter-Academic League (Inter-Ac).

For boys, the Inter-Ac league includes the Haverford School, Malvern Preparatory School, Chestnut Hill Academy, Penn Charter, and Germantown Academy. For girls, this league includes Penn Charter, Germantown Academy, Notre Dame Academy, the Baldwin School, the Agnes Irwin School, and Springside School.

The sports requirement requires all students to participate in athletics during each of the three seasons. Freshman and sophomores are required to participate in at least two inter-scholastic sports with the option of participating in the "Fitness" option for one season. Juniors may elect to participate in the "Fitness" option for two seasons. "Fitness" consists of organized athletic activities three days a week and community service two days a week. There is also a theatre offering (both on the stage and in technical theatre) in the spring (a musical) and the fall. This counts as a "Fitness" option as well. Seniors are permitted to take a "Senior Cut", that is they do not have to participate in any athletics for one season so long as they never received an "unsatisfactory" effort grade in any sport during their four years in the upper school.

As a co-founder of the oldest High School sport's league in America, the Inter-Academic League, and in the second oldest school rivalry in the nation, (against the Haverford School, later adding Agnes Irwin School) Episcopal Academy athletic teams have gained a national reputation. The boys basketball team, coached by Daniel Dougherty, gained national attention in 2005 and 2006, with full team effort including players Gerald Henderson '06 and Wayne Ellington '06. Both were nationally ranked high school basketball players. Henderson signed to play for Duke University while Ellington signed to play for the University of North Carolina.

== Facilities ==
=== Buildings ===
- Academic Center, with the Middle School, Upper School, and Science Center.
- Lower School Building
- Crawford Campus Center, including the Annenberg Library
- Theater with Stadium Seating
- Chapel, at the Center of Campus
- Athletic Center, with a competition gymnasium and pool
- Stadium Football Field
- Black Box Theatre
- Head of School's House
- Chaplain's House
