= List of William Penn Charter School people =

This List of William Penn Charter School people includes notable alumni of William Penn Charter School, a private school in Philadelphia, Pennsylvania.

== List ==
- Chris Albright, OPC ’97, professional soccer player
- Rubén Amaro, Jr., OPC '83, baseball player, former general manager of Philadelphia Phillies, and coach of Boston Red Sox and New York Mets
- Steven Balbus, OPC '71, Savilian Professor of Astronomy, University of Oxford
- Donald Barnhouse, OPC '39, preacher, pastor, radio pioneer
- David Berkoff, OPC ’84, Olympic medalist in swimming
- Raynal Bolling, OPC '96 (1896), first high-ranking U.S. officer to be killed in combat in World War I
- Henry Joel Cadbury, OPC '99 (1899), Quaker scholar, teacher, Harvard Divinity chair 1934–1954
- Brendan Cellucci, baseball player
- Bobby Convey, '98 (did not graduate), professional soccer player
- Charles Gwynne Douglas, III, OPC '60, former Supreme Court justice from the state of New Hampshire, former U.S. congressman
- Pierre S. du Pont OPC 1886, industrialist, philanthropist, DuPont Corporation director, one-time chairman of General Motors
- J. Presper Eckert, OPC '37, University of Pennsylvania researcher, computer pioneer, co-creator of the world's first electronic computer, ENIAC
- Richard B. Fisher, OPC '53, chairman emeritus of Morgan Stanley
- Adam F. Goldberg, OPC '94, television and film writer, created The Goldbergs and Schooled, both of which take place partially or fully at "William Penn Academy", a fictionalized version of William Penn Charter School
- Bill Green IV, OPC '83, former chairman of the Philadelphia School Reform Commission and former Philadelphia City Council member at-large
- Crawford Greenewalt, OPC '18, chemist, head of DuPont Corp. '48–'67, developed nylon fabrics
- John Grotzinger, OPC '75, geologist, professor, co-investigator on the Mars 2020 Rover
- Mark Gubicza, OPC '81, former professional baseball pitcher, current color commentator for Los Angeles Angels
- George Hauptfuhrer, OPC '44, third overall selection in the 1948 BAA Draft
- Howard Head, OPC ’32, founder of Head Ski Company & Prince Manufacturing Inc. 1914–1991
- Joseph M. Hoeffel, OPC '68, Pennsylvania 13th District congressman
- Leicester Bodine Holland, architect and archaeologist
- Fame Ijeboi, OPC '24, college football running back for the Purdue Boilermakers
- John B. Kelly Jr., OPC '45, Olympic medalist and former president of the U.S. Olympic Committee, brother of Grace Kelly
- Kenny Koplove, OPC '12, professional baseball player, 2012 Gatorade Pennsylvania Player of the Year
- Rob Kurz, OPC '04, NBA player
- David Leebron, OPC '73, president of Rice University in Houston, Texas
- Richard Lester, director of the Beatles' films A Hard Day's Night and Help!
- Douglas Macgregor PhD., senior military officer and author
- Mike McGlinchey, OPC '13, offensive tackle for the Denver Broncos
- Jack Meyer, OPC '50, former pitcher for the Philadelphia Phillies
- David Montgomery, OPC '64, president of the Philadelphia Phillies
- David W. Oxtoby, OPC '68, president of Pomona College and professor of chemistry
- Endicott Peabody, former governor of Massachusetts, member of the College Football Hall of Fame (defense for Harvard)
- Robert Picardo, OPC '71, The Doctor on Star Trek: Voyager
- William T. Read, lawyer, president of the New Jersey Senate, treasurer of New Jersey
- Tony Resch, OPC '81, former professional lacrosse player, current coach, and NLL Hall of Fame inductee
- Grover C. Richman, Jr., U.S. attorney for the District of New Jersey (1951–53) and New Jersey attorney general (1954–58)
- David Riesman, OPC '26, former Harvard University sociology professor, lawyer, author of sociology classic The Lonely Crowd
- Matt Ryan, OPC '03, former quarterback for the Atlanta Falcons and Indianapolis Colts
- Vic Seixas, OPC '41, former professional tennis player, won Wimbledon in 1953 and the US Open in 1954
- Michael Siani, OPC '18, professional baseball player for the St. Louis Cardinals, 2018 Gatorade Pennsylvania Player of the Year
- Sammy Siani, OPC '19, professional baseball player, drafted 37th overall in 2019 MLB draft by Pittsburgh Pirates
- Sean Singletary, OPC '04, professional basketball player
- David Sirota, OPC '94, author, journalist, and political strategist
- J.C. Spink OPC 1990, manager and producer, principal at Benderspink
- J. David Stern, OPC 1902, publisher of The Philadelphia Record (1928–47) and other newspapers
- Jesse Watters (did not graduate), Watters' World, Fox News
- Frederick F. Woerner, Jr., OPC '51, former commander-in-chief, United States Southern Command (1987–89)
- Daryl Worley, OPC '13, professional football player
