= Haverford School =

Prep school in Haverford, Pennsylvania, US

The Haverford School

Location
- 450 Lancaster Avenue; Haverford, Pennsylvania 19041; United States; 40°00′52″N 75°18′19″W

Information
- Former name: The Haverford College Grammar School
- School type: Independent college-preparatory day school
- Motto: Greek: eutaxia soizein dokei
- Religious affiliation: Nonsectarian
- Established: 1884; 142 years ago
- Status: Currently operational
- CEEB code: 391700
- Head of school: Tyler Casertano
- Gender: All-male
- Enrollment: 1,013 total 436 Upper School; 225 Middle School; 352 Lower School
- Average class size: 16 students (Upper School); 17 Students (Lower and Middle School)
- Student to teacher ratio: 8:1
- Campus size: 30 acres (12 ha)
- Campus type: Suburban
- Colors: Maroon & Gold
- Athletics conference: Inter-Academic League
- Nickname: Fords
- Rivals: Episcopal Academy; Malvern Preparatory School
- Newspaper: The Index
- Endowment: $109.2 million
- Annual tuition: $42,600
- Revenue: $63.66 million
- Website: haverford.org

The Haverford School is a private, non-sectarian, all-boys college preparatory day school, junior kindergarten through grade twelve. Founded in 1884 as The Haverford College Grammar School, it is located in Haverford, Pennsylvania.

== History ==
The school was founded in 1884 at the request of Alexander and Lois Cassatt, niece of President James Buchanan, as The Haverford College Grammar School. Affiliated initially with neighboring Haverford College until 1903, the school became independent, changed its name to The Haverford School, and moved to its current location across Railroad Avenue from the college. The school was Quaker during its affiliation with the college but is now non-sectarian.

Haverford's original school colors were red and yellow for the first decade of the school's existence. However, after the outbreak of the Spanish–American War in 1898, the official colors were changed to maroon and gold out of national pride since the colors of the Spanish flag were the same red and yellow.

== Curriculum ==
All Upper School students must take four years of English, three years of history, mathematics, and science, and two consecutive years of foreign language and fine arts. Many students elect to take four years of history, foreign language, and fine arts.

== Athletics ==
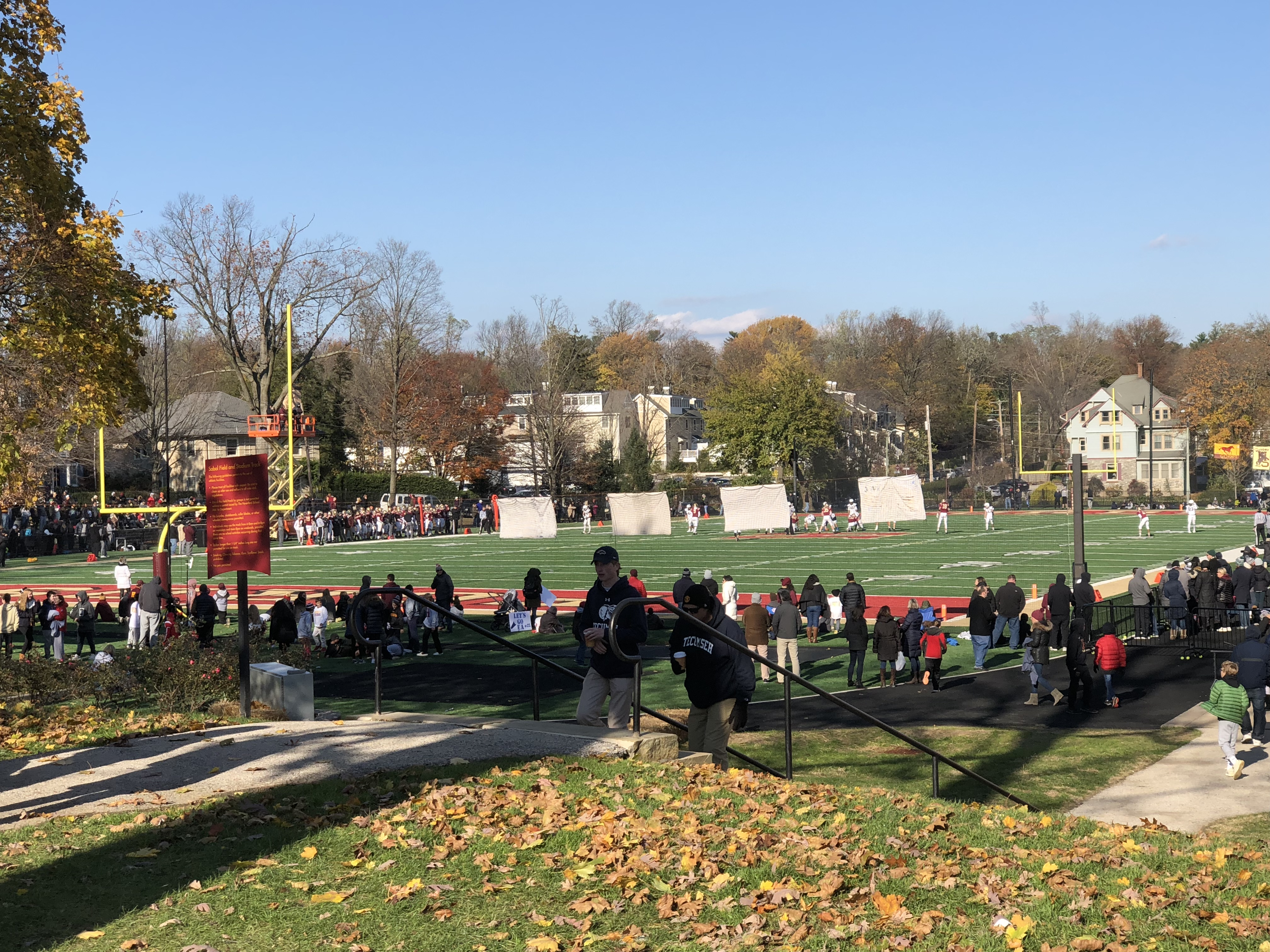
Football on EA Day

The Haverford School is a member of the Inter-Academic League, the country's oldest inter-scholastic athletic conference.

With eighteen interscholastic sports, Haverford ranks among the top 20% of private high schools in Pennsylvania for amount of sports offered.

The Haverford School lacrosse team gained national fame when the Fords won national championships in 2011 and 2015 after undefeated seasons. The 2015 team won USA Today's All-USA Boys' Lacrosse Team honors. The Fords lacrosse team is the most awarded team in the Inter-Ac League, having won two national championships, ten state championships, and eighteen Inter-Ac titles.

In 2018–19, Haverford captured the Inter-Ac's Heyward Cup for overall excellence in athletic competition. The Fords have won the Heyward Cup 18 times, more than any other school in the league.

=== EA Day ===
Haverford is known for its long-running rivalry with fellow Inter-Academic League member Episcopal Academy. The two schools have competed annually since 1889 on Haverford-EA Day, a day of competition occurring each November.

=== #10ve Cup ===
A newer, friendly rivalry exists between Haverford and Garnet Valley High School's lacrosse teams. When Kip Taviano, a Concord Township-native and Haverford School lacrosse and football player, was killed in a 2013 car accident, the two schools came together to establish the #10ve Foundation in his memory. Haverford School and Garnet Valley compete in the #10ve Cup, an annual lacrosse event to benefit the Kip Taviano '13 Scholarship Fund.

== Campus ==
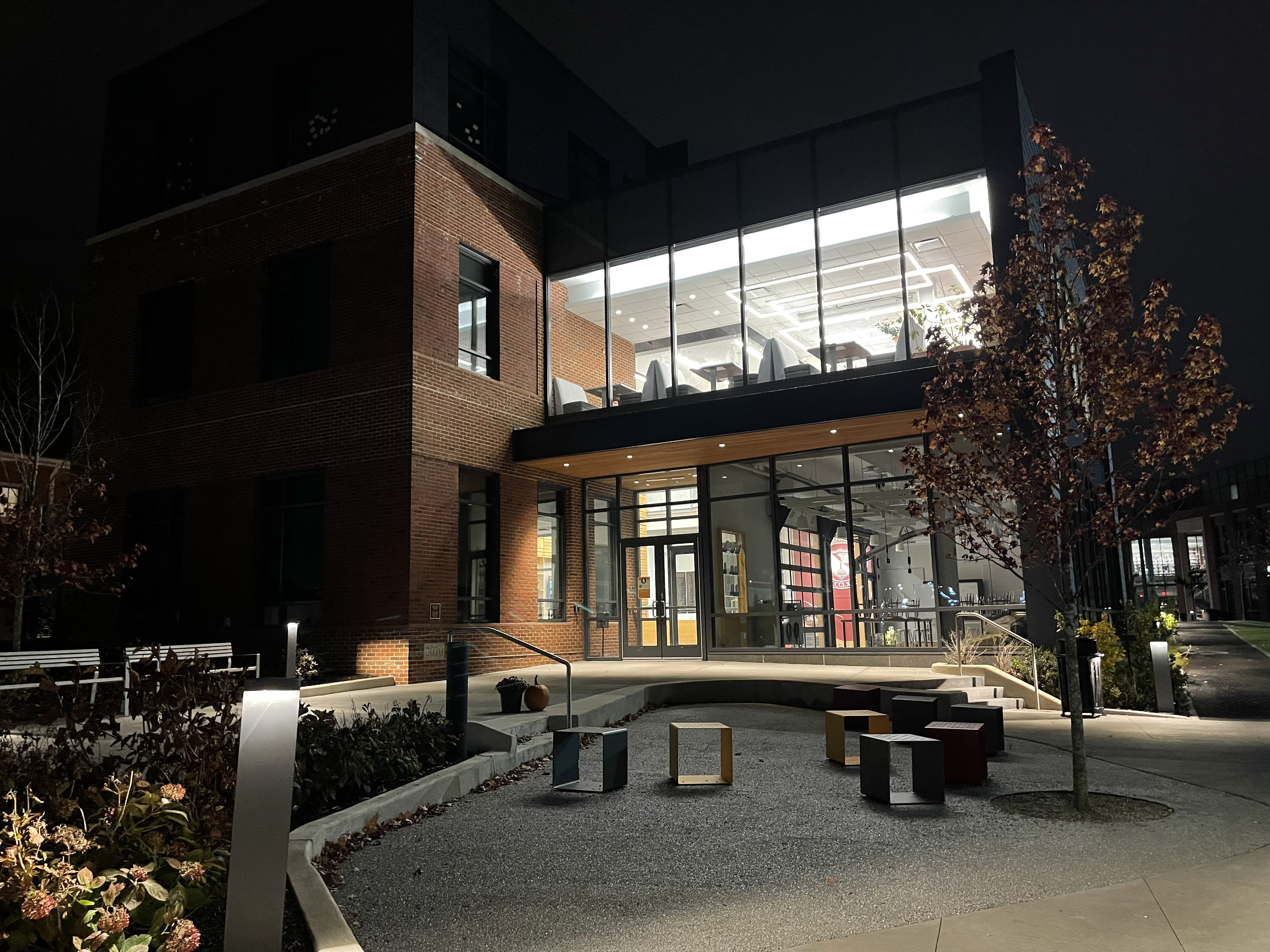
Middle School building at night, rebuilt in 2020

All of the Haverford School's academic buildings and athletic fields are located at its original 30-acre campus. There are five significant buildings: the Upper School, Middle School, Lower School, Field House, and Dining Hall. In addition, there is a small building home to the school store and cafe.

The athletic facilities include a 25-meter, eight-lane pool with two dive wells, four international-size squash courts, three regulation-sized basketball courts, a three-mat wrestling room with panoramic windows, an athletic training center, and an advanced fitness center. Outdoor facilities include three turf fields, one grass field, a four-lane track, an outdoor basketball court, and four tennis courts. The school also owns a boathouse in nearby Conshohocken. Before its 2015 construction, the crew team had rowed out of the Undine Barge Club since 1938.

== Sister schools ==
Haverford's sister schools are the Baldwin School in nearby Bryn Mawr and the Agnes Irwin School. The three schools hold several academic and community service events across the Philadelphia region.

== Heads of school ==
- Charles Sumner Crosman, 1884–1912
- Edwin Mood Wilson, 1912–1937
- Cornelius B. Boocock, 1937–1942
- Leslie R. Severinghaus, 1942–1965
- Kenneth Kingham, 1965–1966
- Davis R. Parker, 1966–1987
- William Boulton Dixon, 1987–1992
- Joseph P. Healey, 1992–1998
- Joseph T. Cox, 1998–2013
- John A. Nagl, 2013–2021
- Tyler Casertano, 2021–present
