= Michael Siani =

Michael Siani may refer to:

- Mike Siani (American football) (born 1950), American football wide receiver
- Michael Siani (baseball) (born 1999), American baseball outfielder
