= Inter-Academic League =

- Formerly: Interacademic Athletic Association
- Founded: 1887; 139 years ago
- No. of teams: 10
- Region: Philadelphia metropolitan area, Pennsylvania, United States

The Inter-Academic League (officially known as the Inter-Academic Association of Philadelphia and Vicinity, commonly known as the Inter-Ac) is an inter-scholastic athletic conference. This high school sports league consists of selective private schools in the Philadelphia area.

== History ==
The schools were organized into a conference early in 1887 when they came together as the Interacademic Athletic Association (the name was later shortened to its present configuration). Two initial sports offered by the league were football and track and field.

It was one of the earliest permanent interscholastic football leagues, and the rivalry between Penn Charter and Germantown Academy is perhaps the oldest football rivalry in the country.

Early members were Germantown Academy, Haverford Grammar, Penn Charter, De Lancey, Friends' Central School, Swarthmore High School, and Episcopal Academy. In the first decade after the turn of the century the league increased the number of sports, adding ice hockey, baseball, tennis, and basketball.

== Member schools ==
Boys' Members:

Institution	Location	Founded	Affiliation	Enrollment	Nickname	Colors
Episcopal Academy	Newtown Square, Pennsylvania	1785	Episcopalianism	1,268	Churchmen	
Germantown Academy	Fort Washington, Pennsylvania	1759	Nonsectarian	1,189	Patriots	
Haverford School	Haverford, Pennsylvania	1884	Nonsectarian	1,013	Fords	
Malvern Preparatory School	Malvern, Pennsylvania	1842	Catholicism	640	Friars	
Springside Chestnut Hill Academy	Philadelphia, Pennsylvania	1861	Nonsectarian	1,080	Blue Devils	
William Penn Charter School	Philadelphia, Pennsylvania	1689	Quakerism	960	Quakers	

Girls' Members:

Institution	Location	Founded	Affiliation	Enrollment	Nickname	Colors
Academy of Notre Dame de Namur	Radnor, Pennsylvania	1856	Catholicism	559	Irish	
Agnes Irwin School	Rosemont, Pennsylvania	1869	Nonsectarian	606	Owls	
Baldwin School	Bryn Mawr, Pennsylvania	1888	Nonsectarian	571	Bears	
Episcopal Academy	Newtown Square, Pennsylvania	1785	Episcopalianism	1,268	Churchmen	
Germantown Academy	Fort Washington, Pennsylvania	1759	Nonsectarian	1,189	Patriots	
Springside Chestnut Hill Academy	Philadelphia, Pennsylvania	1861	Nonsectarian	1,080	Blue Devils	
William Penn Charter School	Philadelphia, Pennsylvania	1689	Quakerism	960	Quakers	
