= Eleanor Stuart Childs =

American novelist

Eleanor Stuart Childs (June 2, 1872 — April 27, 1952), who often used the pen-name Eleanor Stuart, was an American novelist and short story writer, who lived for a time in Zanzibar.

== Biography ==
Eleanor Stuart Patterson was born in East Orange, New Jersey, the daughter of Edward Patterson and Isabel Liddon Coxe Patterson. Her father was a judge, and president of the Bar Association of the City of New York. She attended the Agnes Irwin School in Philadelphia.

Patterson was writing for magazines by age 16. Her short stories appeared in Harper's Magazine, Scribner's Magazine, and McClure's Magazine. She also wrote essays, for National Geographic about Zanzibar, where she lived for several years with her husband and young son, and for the Boston Evening Transcript about Theodore Roosevelt's trip to Africa.

The New York Times reviewed Stonepastures as "a most masculine book, so grim and hard and adamantine" in its depiction of life in a Pennsylvania mining town. Another reviewer called Stonepastures a "homegrown novelette, concise, vivid, and vigorous...unusually satisfactory in itself, and rich in its promise for the writer's future."

In 1903, she married an ivory importer, Harris Robbins Childs. Their only child, Edward Patterson Childs, was born in Zanzibar in 1904. She was widowed in 1922, in the same year her husband's company went bankrupt and was investigated for irregularities. She died in 1952, aged 79 years.

== Selected works ==
Novels

- Stonepastures (1895)
- Averages: A Story of New York (1899)
- The Postscript (1908)
- The Romance of Ali (1913)
