= Sammy Siani =

American baseball player (born 2000)

Free agent
- Outfielder
- Born: December 14, 2000 (age 25); Glenside, Pennsylvania, U.S.
- Bats: Left Throws: Left
- Stats at Baseball Reference

Samuel James Siani (born December 14, 2000) is an American professional baseball outfielder who is a free agent.

== Amateur career ==
Siani attended William Penn Charter School in Philadelphia, Pennsylvania. In 2019, his senior year, he hit .457 with 25 RBI and 16 stolen bases. Siani was named the 2019 Pennsylvania High School Player of the Year by Perfect Game. He committed to play college baseball at Duke University.

== Professional career ==
=== Pittsburgh Pirates ===
Siani was selected by the Pittsburgh Pirates with the 37th overall pick in the 2019 Major League Baseball draft. He signed for $2.15 million and was assigned to the Rookie-level Gulf Coast League Pirates. Over 39 games, he batted .241 with three doubles, nine RBI, and five stolen bases. He did not play a minor league game in 2020 due to the cancellation of the minor league season caused by the COVID-19 pandemic. To begin the 2021 season, he was assigned to the Bradenton Marauders of the Low-A Southeast. In mid-July, he was placed on the injured list, and returned in early September. Over 62 games with Bradenton, Siani slashed .215/.376/.390 with eight home runs and 35 RBI.

Siani was assigned to the Greensboro Grasshoppers of the High-A South Atlantic League for the 2022 season. Over 82 games, he batted .201 with seven home runs, 28 RBI, and 25 stolen bases. He returned to Greensboro for the 2023 season and hit .231 with nine home runs, 48 RBI, and 16 stolen bases over 99 games. Siani split the 2024 season between Greensboro and the Altoona Curve, hitting .265 with nine home runs, 48 RBI, and 16 stolen bases. After the season, he was assigned to play in the Arizona Fall League with the Scottsdale Scorpions.

Siani was assigned to Altoona to open the 2025 season and was promoted to the Indianapolis Indians of the Triple-A International League in mid-August. He made 105 appearances for Indianapolis, Altoona, Bradenton, and the rookie-level Florida Complex League Pirates, batting a cumulative .208/.301/.322 with seven home runs, 41 RBI, and 19 stolen bases. Siani elected free agency following the season on November 6, 2025.

=== Seattle Mariners ===
On December 23, 2025, Siani signed a minor league contract with the Seattle Mariners. He played the 2026 season with the Double-A Arkansas Travelers and batted .245 with seven home runs and 36 RBI across 69 games. He elected free agency on November 2.

== Personal life ==
Siani's older brother, Michael, plays in the Detroit Tigers organization.
