= Germantown Academy =

School in Fort Washington, Pennsylvania, US

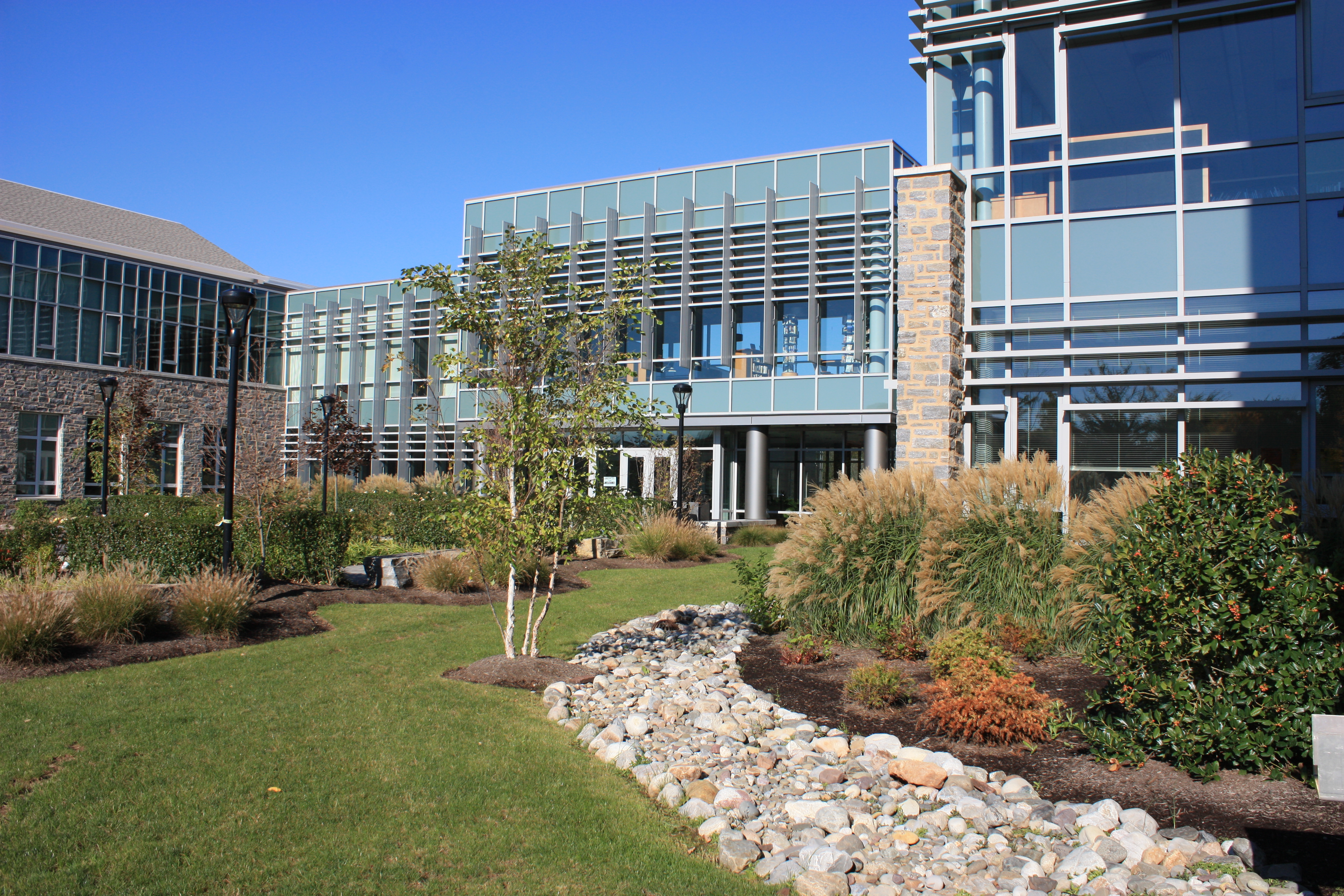
- Germantown Academy Upper School in 2013

Location
- 340 Morris Road; Fort Washington, Pennsylvania, United States of America; Fort Washington, Pennsylvania 19034-0287; United States; 40.137514°N 75.220106°W

Information
- Other names: G.A., The Public School of Germantown
- Type: Private
- Motto: "By persevering we shall see the fruits."
- Established: December 6, 1759
- Status: Open
- CEEB code: 393321
- Head of school: Richard Schellhas
- Faculty: 163
- Teaching staff: 250
- Grades: Pre-kindergarten to 12th
- Gender: Coeducational
- Enrollment: 1,226
- Language: English
- Campus type: Suburban, though with wildlife preserve
- Houses: Alcott Day, Galloway, Kershaw, Osbourn, Roberts, Truesdell, Washington
- Colors: Red, black, and blue
- Fight song: Alma Mater
- Athletics conference: Inter-Academic League
- Mascot: Patriot
- Rival: William Penn Charter School
- Newspaper: The Edition
- Yearbook: Ye Primer
- Website: www.germantownacademy.net

Germantown Academy, informally known as GA and originally known as the Union School, is the oldest nonsectarian day school in the United States. The school was founded on December 6, 1759, by a group of Germantown citizens in the Green Tree Tavern on the Germantown Road. Germantown Academy enrolls students from pre-kindergarten to 12th grade and is located in the Philadelphia suburb of Fort Washington, having moved from its original Germantown campus in 1965. The original campus, Old Germantown Academy and Headmasters' Houses, is listed on the National Register of Historic Places. The school shares the oldest continuous high school football rivalry with the William Penn Charter School.

== History ==
=== Early years ===
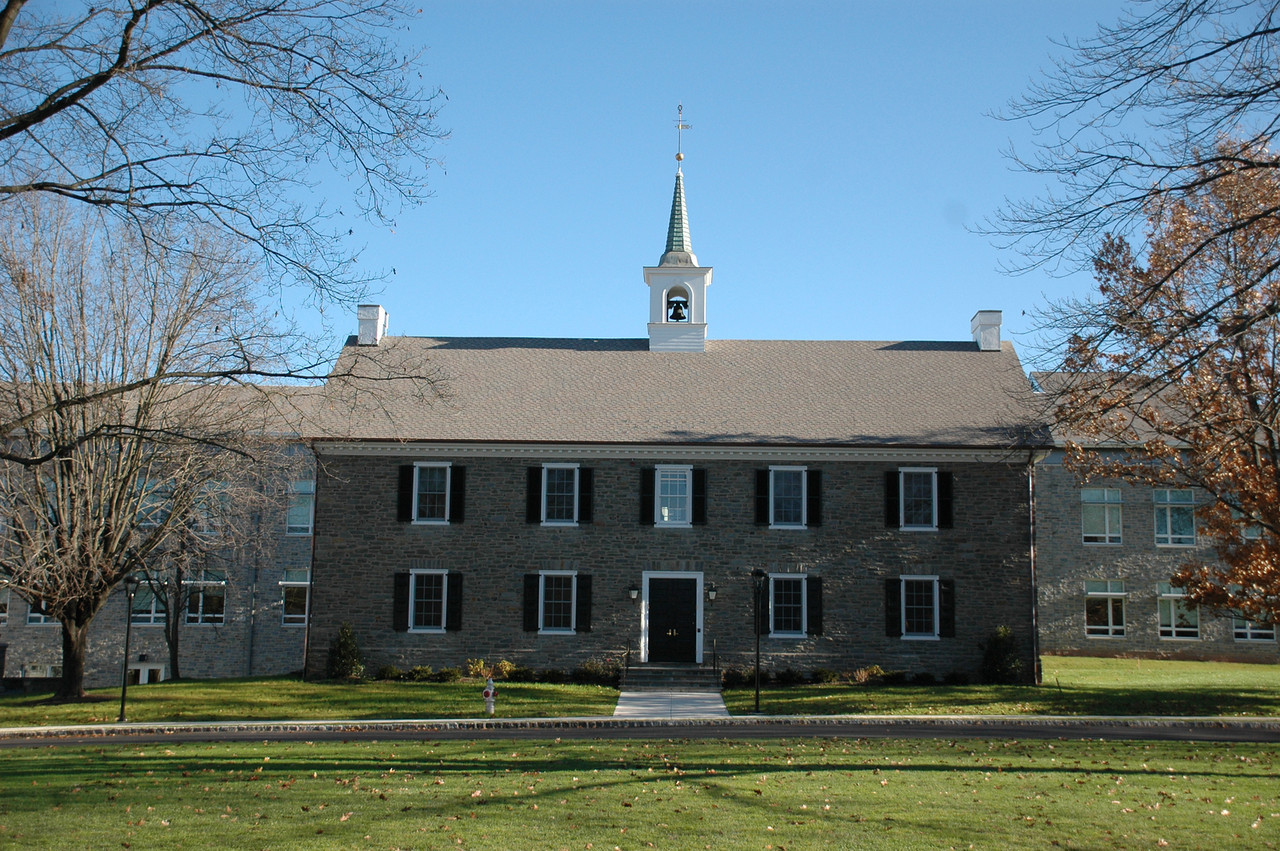
Administration Building, an exact replica of the original schoolhouse in Germantown

The Union School was founded on the evening of December 6, 1759, at the Green Tree Tavern on Germantown Avenue. The school was founded by prominent members of the Germantown community who wished to provide a country school for their children. As some of the founders and residents of Germantown were of German descent, it was decided that the school be opened with both English and German speaking departments. The founders chose David James Dove to head the English department and Hilarius Becker of Bernheim, Germany, to head the German school. In 1761, land was given to the school by trustee Charles Bensell, and a schoolhouse with its iconic belfry was constructed.

The school found itself in the crossroads of early American history. In 1777, the Battle of Germantown was fought on the front lawn of trustee Benjamin Chew at his home Cliveden less than a mile from campus. During the American Revolution, the school served as a hospital and camp for British soldiers. Legend says that the British officers played the first game of cricket in America on the academy's front lawn. After the war, the school was visited by President George Washington. Washington sent his adopted step-grandson George Washington Parke Custis to the academy during the 1793 yellow fever epidemic in Philadelphia. The school was visited by the Marquis de Lafayette on his 1825 visit to America and hosted Fernando, the adopted son of South American liberator Simón Bolívar. In 1830, Amos Bronson Alcott, father of Louisa May Alcott, was appointed headmaster and attempts were made to co-educate the school but were quickly abandoned.

=== The Kershaw years ===
After the Civil War, the school was in decline, with a small student body and outdated facilities. In 1877, Dr. William Kershaw was appointed headmaster. Under his leadership, the academy gained prominence and expanded its activities with the introduction of the Inter-Academic League (1887), The Belfry Club, one of the oldest high school drama clubs in the country (1894), and The Academy Monthly (1885), one of the oldest student literary magazines still in existence. During his headmastership, GA graduated a future University of Pennsylvania president, a Supreme Court justice, and a primate of the Episcopal Church.

=== 20th century ===
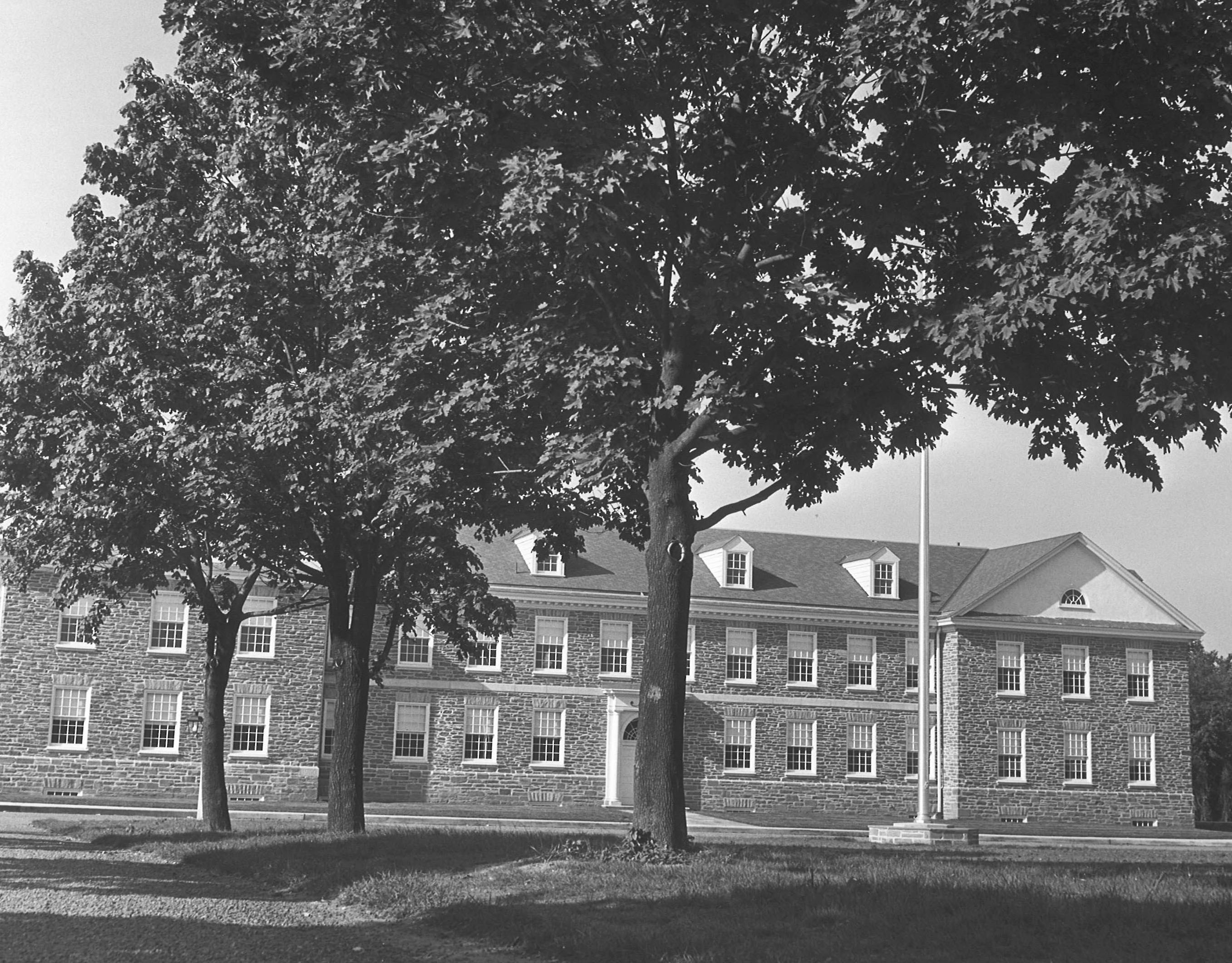
A view of McLean Hall shortly after its construction in 1965

In 1915, Dr. Kershaw retired and Dr. Samuel E. Osbourn was appointed headmaster. Under Dr. Osbourn's leadership, the school increased in size, focused on scholarship and continued to produce some of Philadelphia's finest citizens. Under Osbourn, GA established the eighth oldest Cum Laude Society chapter in the nation and started an endowment.

After the World Wars, GA was led by headmaster Donald Miller who was instrumental in the move from Germantown to the current Fort Washington campus. By the 1960s, more and more lower income minority families moved into Germantown and GA families left Germantown for the nearby suburbs. In five years, "The Miracle of Fort Washington" (a term coined by Judge Jerome O'Neill, '28) occurred as the school moved from city to suburb. In this transition, GA coeducated, accepting girls in 1961 with the first co-ed class graduating in 1968.

== Lower School ==
The Lower School consists of three main buildings: Leas Hall, McLean Hall (constructed in 1964), and the Abramson Lower School (constructed in 1999). Leas Hall comprises the Pre-Kindergarten and Kindergarten classrooms, while McLean Hall contains 1st, 2nd, 3rd, 4th, and 5th grade classrooms. The Abramson Lower School has two 3rd grade classrooms, science rooms, and music classrooms.

There are currently 347 students enrolled in the Lower School (as of the 2019–20 school year), and a student-to-teacher ratio of 14:1.

== Middle school ==
The Middle School as a separate department was established in 1976. It was first led by Barbara Hitschler Serrill,'68 and then run by longtime Head of Middle School, Richard House. The first Alter Middle School was donated by Dennis and Gisela Alter and constructed in 1997. In 2011, the new Alter Middle School was constructed and opened as a part of the Building on Tradition campus campaign. There are many activities for students, such as the science fair, a play and musical, sports teams, many clubs, such as a Fandom Club, an art club, and a literary magazine. There are 275 students currently enrolled in the Middle school (as of the 2019–20 school year).

== Upper School ==
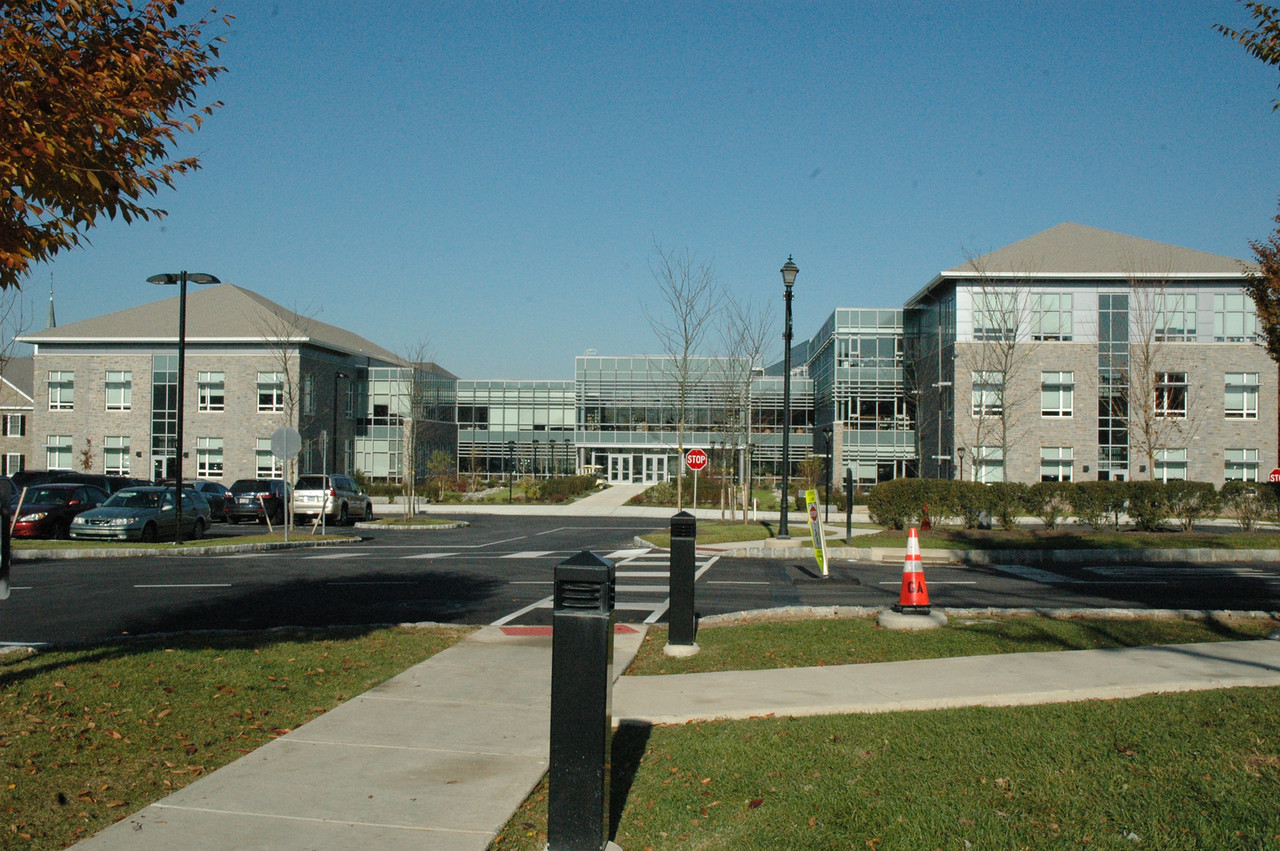
The Middle and Upper Schools after their rebuilding in 2011

Students are required at minimum, five credits per year and at least four years of English, three years of Math, Science, History, two years of Language, and one year of Art. There are 567 students enrolled in the Upper School (as of the 2019–20 school year). The student to teacher ratio is currently 8:1 in the Upper School.

The upper school runs on a house system. Each student is placed into one of seven houses. These houses include, Alcott Day, Washington, Galloway, Osbourn, Kershaw, Truesdell, and Roberts. Each house is named after an important figure with a Germantown Academy connection. A student will stay with their house for all four years of upper school life. Over the course of a year, each house will meet once or twice a week, and for special events, they will compete against each other. These special events include The Knowledge Bowl House Olympics and The Annual Spelling Bee. Each year a house cup is crowned to the house with the most house points which are earned throughout the year in events such as the house competitions above.

Conduct in the upper school is governed by the Honor Code, a system where students agree to a set of rules, and where, in the case of an infraction, students are judged by an honor council consisting of teachers and peers.

=== Upper School publications ===
- The Academy Monthly is one of the oldest student run literary magazines in the country, founded in 1884. Published biannually. Features student and faculty writing and artwork.
- The Edition is the Upper School newspaper was founded in 1969. It includes editorials, school news and sports updates as well as commentary on contemporary culture.
- Frequency: Frequency magazine provides insight into contemporary music scene through editorials, CD reviews, news about upcoming concerts and album release dates. Students and staff are encouraged to submit material.
- maGAzine: maGAzine is the Upper School current events/political journal. It includes political commentary, articles and artwork by students and staff.
- Voyager: The Upper School's Modern Language Journal features articles on world cultures and language. Includes observations, poetry, travel writing and artwork by students and staff.
- Ye Primer: First published in 1895 as a record of the senior class, the yearbook has expanded to include the whole school. It captures the life of the student body, faculty and staff with pictures, articles and senior pages.

=== House system ===
The house system was established in 2007 at the insistence of Headmaster Jim Connor and Upper School faculty member Ted Haynie. The seven-house system is modeled after the ancient English public school concept of joining students from different years in a common group. Each of the seven houses is named for an influential alumnus or friend of the academy. Each house consists of roughly 80 people and competes in various competitions throughout the year. The system also provides an academic and social support system for underclassmen as they have the chance to interact with upperclassmen and a variety of faculty. Each house consists of many advisories and is run by one House Head and three student prefects. The advisories each have one or two advisors and around 11 student advisees. Prefects are selected by house faculty through an interview process for interested Juniors. Those chosen take on their responsibilities in the final weeks of their Junior year, as old prefects start to focus on Senior Projects, then continue through the next school year until it is time for them to focus on their own Senior Projects. Throughout the year, the houses compete in various competitions ranging from a Knowledge Bowl to a German Folk Song Singing Contest to Handball, etc. The highpoint of the house system calendar is the House Olympics which is held in early May where the different houses compete in athletic and academic competitions for a chance of the House Olympics Trophy (in parentheses is the faculty house head for the 2017–18 school year)

Washington is named for President George Washington, a patron of the old school and a parent as his step-son George Washington Parke Custis attended in the 1790s. The house colors are black and silver and Washington himself serves as the house mascot. (Steven Moll)

Alcott Day (previously known as just Alcott until June 3, 2016) is named for former headmaster Amos Bronson Alcott, and longtime teacher Virginia Belle Day. Alcott, the father of renowned author Louisa May Alcott, believed strongly in providing girls with an education comparable to that given to boys, despite the fact that most educators of his day sought to emphasize a ‘domestic arts’ curriculum for girls. He introduced coeducational integration for a brief period starting in 1831, before leaving the academy three years later. Virginia "Jinny" Day worked tirelessly to make the academy open to all, regardless of gender, in 1963. Alcott house colors are blue and green and its house mascot is the alligator. (Peggy Bradley)

Roberts is named for Supreme Court Justice Owen J. Roberts, a member of the class of 1890. Roberts House colors are blue and orange and their mascot is the walrus. (Allison Rader)

Truesdell is named for longtime GA teacher, Walter Truesdell. Truesdell was Phi Beta Kappa and taught Latin for thirty years. The house colors are blue and silver and the mascot is the timberwolf. (Rachel Lingten)

Kershaw is named for headmaster Dr. William Kershaw (1877–1915). Kershaw's colors are navy blue and light blue, the mascot is the kangaroo, and the house motto/cheer is "Roll 'Roos!" (Matt Dence)

Galloway is named for early Academy trustee Joseph Galloway, a notable Philadelphia figure during the Revolution. Galloway's house colors are black and yellow and their mascot is the Griffin. (Dr. Michael Torrey)

Osbourn is named for longtime headmaster Dr. Samuel E. Osbourn (1915–1948). The house colors are green and white and their mascot is the owl. (Dr. Adam Wilsman)

== The Belfry Club ==
In 1894, J. Warner Johnson, a student at Germantown Academy, and a few of his schoolmates formed a dramatic society with the intention to appreciate the performing arts before their college years. Drama clubs like the University of Pennsylvania's Mask and Wig were established already and popular among college students of the late 19th century. The group, led by Johnson brought the idea to Germantown Academy alumnus Frank Palmer, an 1885 GA alumnus who then led the society for another fifteen years. The first production was of the comedy/drama Married Life held at the Workingmen's Club Hall on nearby Chelten Avenue. Admission was $1 and 50 cents for seats in the upper gallery. The play was given to raise money for the GA Athletic Association and sold out. After the success of the first year, the students continued the tradition that lasts today.

In 1895, the name of the society was changed to The Belfry Club in honor of the notable Germantown Academy symbol of the Belfry that sits atop the schoolhouse. After a few years, the play grew into a focal point of the school year as it was given the night before the Germantown Academy, Penn Charter football game and was then followed by a dance with surrounding girls' schools.

The Belfry Club's recent awards include 6 from the Greater Philadelphia Cappies Gala (2019) and three awards from the 2019 Philadelphia Independence Awards (2019).

Now, The Belfry Club at Germantown Academy continues performing. It still holds their annual play; rehearsals starting near the start of each school year, and the performances taking place in winter, traditionally in November. In addition to this, The Belfry Club now also puts on an annual musical; rehearsals starting in January and the performances taking place each spring.

== Administration ==
=== Alma mater ===
The alma mater was written c. 1910 by J. Hefflestein Mason, a member of the class of 1900. Class songs originated as early as 1885 and appeared in each class's Ye Primer. Before the current alma mater, the school had a few lesser-known "alma maters" and a school yell which was sung after 1910. Before the 1970s, the alma mater was sung along with the school hymn Our God, Our Help in Ages Past. Mason went on to write more music and perform with the Philadelphia Opera Company.

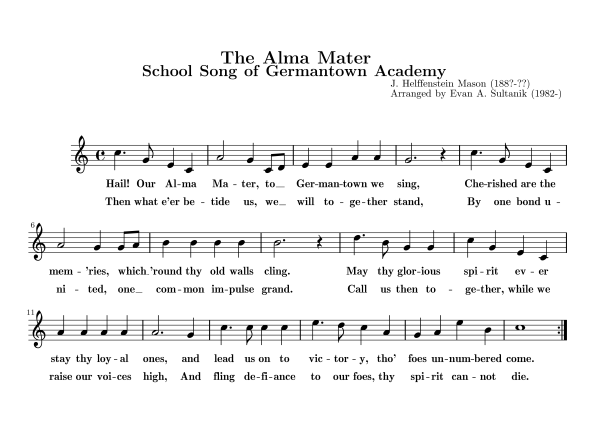

=== Headmasters ===
- David James Dove (1761–1763) Hilarius Becker (1761–1778)
- Pelatiah Webster (1763–1766)
- John Woods (1765–1769)
- John Downey (1769–1774)
- Thomas Dungan (1774–1777)
- George Murray (1777–1778)
- (School closed due to the Revolution, 1778–1784)
- George Murray (1784–1786)
- Thomas Dungan (1786–1805) Rev. Frederick Herman (1794–1795) (German master)
- Nathaniel Major (1805–1806)
- John Conrad (1806–1809)
- William Woodman (1809–1810)
- George I. Howell (1810–1811)
- Enion Williams (1811–1814) Stephen H. Long (1811–1814)
- Jedediah Strong (1814–1819)
- Rev. John R. Goodman (1819–1820)
- John M. Brewer (1820–1821)
- Walter Rogers Johnson (1821–1825)
- J.G. Cooper (1826–1827)
- George R. Giddings (1828–1830)
- Moses Soule (1830)
- Theodore Russell Jenks (1830)
- Amos Bronson Alcott (1831) William Russell (1831)
- John F. Watson (1834)
- John C. Whitehead (1834)
- Rev. Dr. Christian F. Cruse (1835–1836)
- Eugene Smith (1836)
- Rev. Henry K. Green (1836–1839)
- Alfred J. Perkins (1839–1843)
- W.M. Collom (1843–1849)
- S.C. Miller (1849–1853)
- James Withington (1853–1863)
- Cyrus V. Mays (1863–1872)
- Rev. William Travis (1872–1877)
- Dr. William Kershaw (1877–1915)
- Dr. Samuel E. Osbourn (1915–1948)
- John F. Godman (1948–1952)
- Dr. Richard W. Day (1952–1956)
- Donald Hope Miller (1956–1966)
- Samuel Stroud (1966–1970)
- Edward "Bud" Kast (1970–1986)
- James Carey Ledyard (1986–1990)
- James W. Connor (1990–2016)
- Richard C. Schellhas (2016–present)

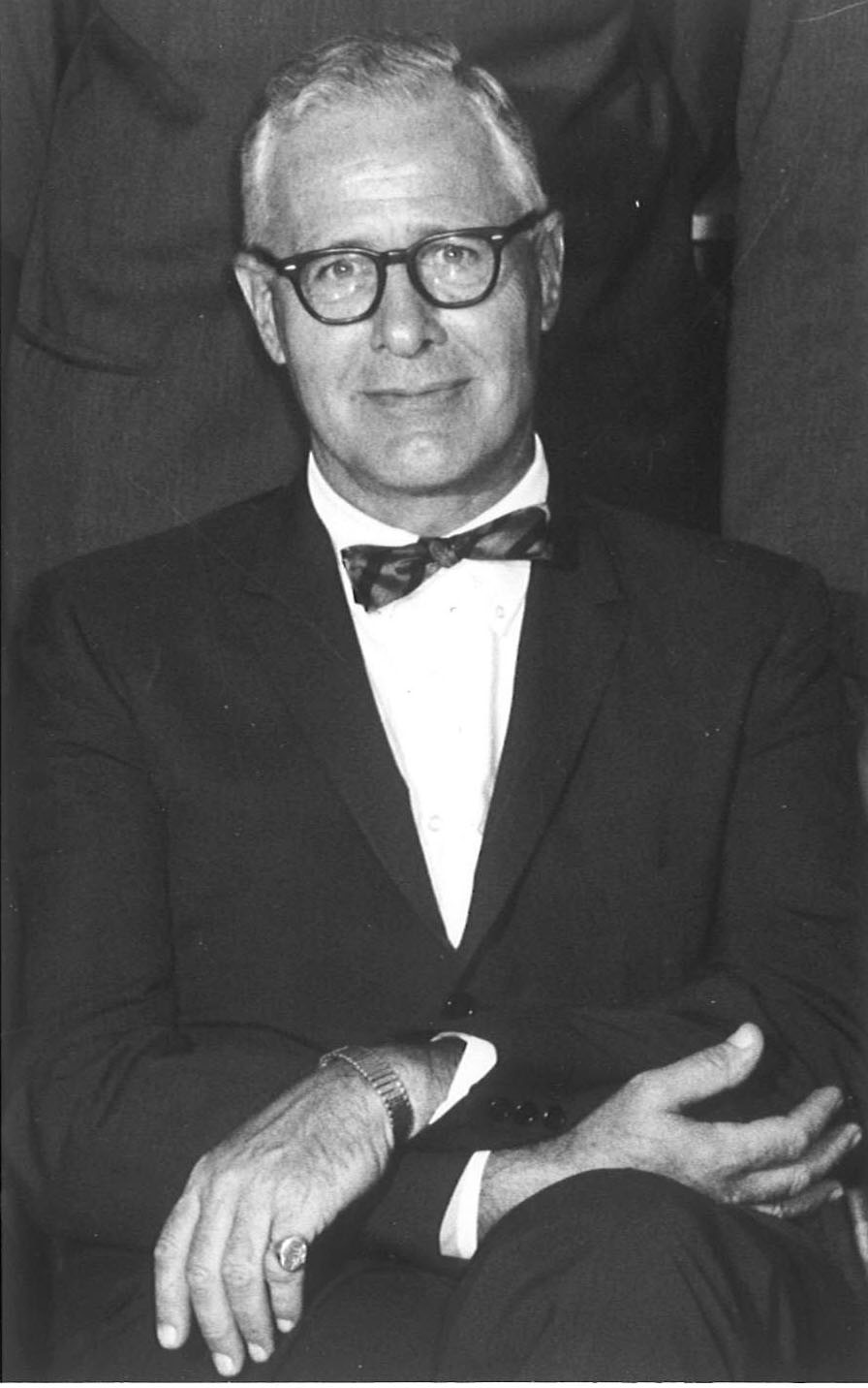
Donald H. Miller, Headmaster 1956–66

== Notable alumni ==
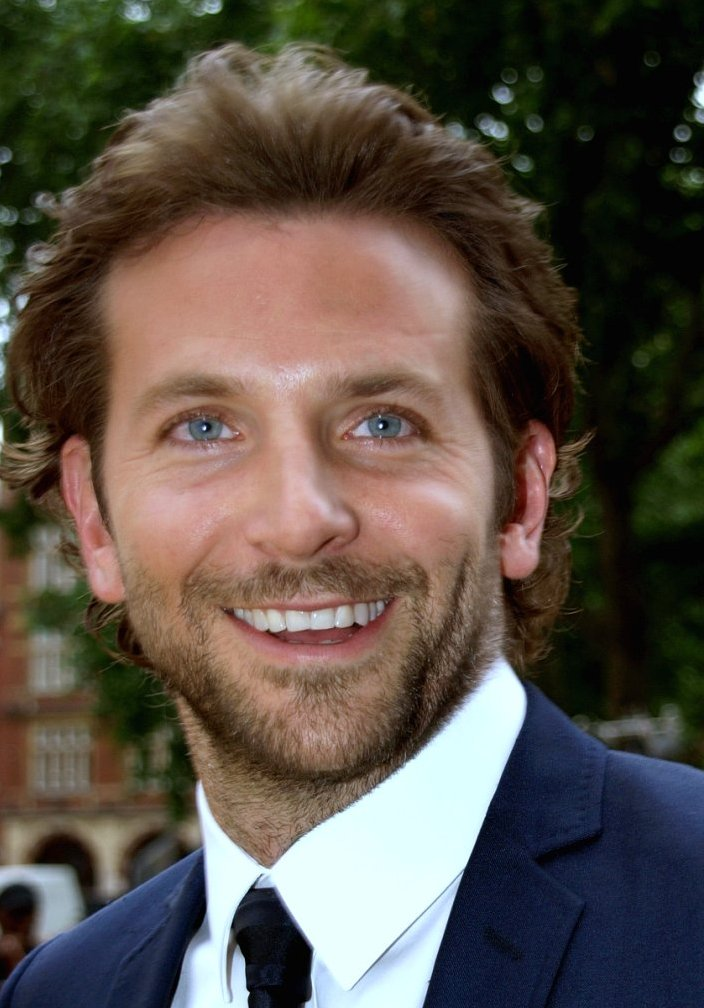
Bradley Cooper, 1993 alumnus

Germantown Academy has notable alumni in the arts, sciences, government, sports, and business, including Bradley Cooper, Brian L. Roberts, Christine Rawak, Alvin Williams, Maddy Crippen, Fran Crippen, Teresa Crippen, Katrina Radke, and Owen J. Roberts

== See also ==
- Old Germantown Academy and Headmasters' Houses
- Inter-Academic League
- Pennsylvania School for the Deaf
