= Richard B. Fisher =

American businessman (b. 1936, d. 2004)

Richard Fisher
- Born: July 21, 1936; Philadelphia, Pennsylvania, U.S.
- Died: December 16, 2004 (aged 68); New York City, New York, U.S.
- Education: Princeton University (BA); Harvard University (MBA)

Richard B. Fisher (1936 – December 16, 2004) was president and chairman of the securities firm Morgan Stanley.

== Early life and education ==
Fisher was born in Philadelphia. In 1944, at age 8, Fisher contracted a severe case of polio. Doctors told his parents that Fisher should be put in a trade school where he could learn to do things with his hands. One doctor saw Fisher's potential, and although his parents had little money, he was able to attend the William Penn Charter School on a full scholarship.

== Career ==
Fisher became the chairman emeritus of Morgan Stanley Dean Witter & Co. in 2000.

== Personal life ==
Fisher was a noted art collector, with paintings by Willem de Kooning, Robert Motherwell, Franz Kline, as well as younger artists such as Robert Baribeau, in his collection of abstract expressionists.
