= Michael Siani (baseball) =

American baseball player (born 1999)

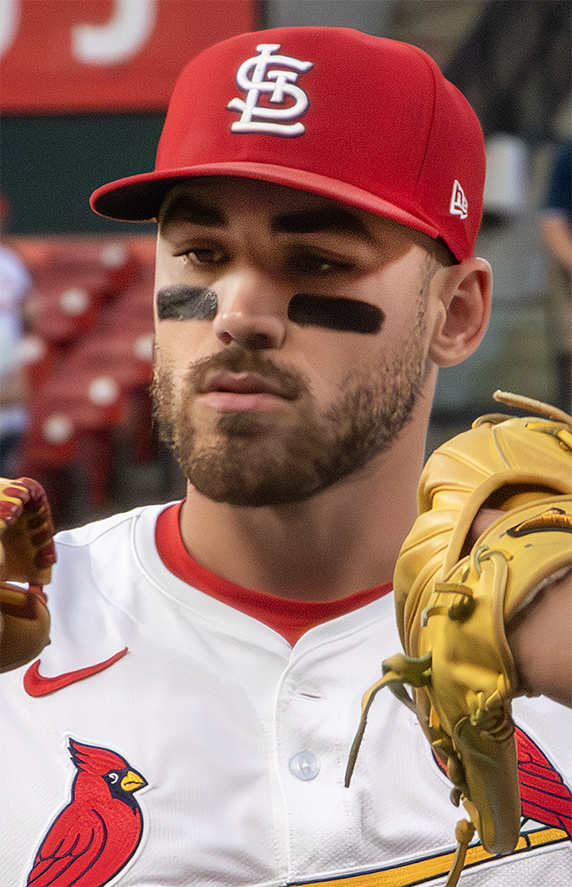
- Siani with the Cardinals in 2024

Free agent
- Outfielder
- Born: July 16, 1999 (age 27); Glenside, Pennsylvania, U.S.
- Bats: Left Throws: Left

MLB debut
- September 22, 2022, for the Cincinnati Reds

MLB statistics (through 2026 season)
- Batting average: .220
- Home runs: 2
- Runs batted in: 20
- Stats at Baseball Reference

Teams
- Cincinnati Reds (2022–2023); St. Louis Cardinals (2023–2025); Baltimore Orioles (2026)
Medals
Men's baseball
Representing United States
U-18 Baseball World Cup
Gold medal – first place	2017 Thunder Bay	Team

Michael Siani (born July 16, 1999) is an American professional baseball outfielder who is a free agent. He has previously played in Major League Baseball (MLB) for the Cincinnati Reds, St. Louis Cardinals, and Baltimore Orioles.

== Early life and amateur career ==
Siani grew up in Glenside, Pennsylvania, and attended William Penn Charter School in Philadelphia. He played for the school's baseball team. As a senior, he batted .361 with two home runs, 11 runs batted in (RBIs), and 19 stolen bases.

== Professional career ==
=== Cincinnati Reds ===
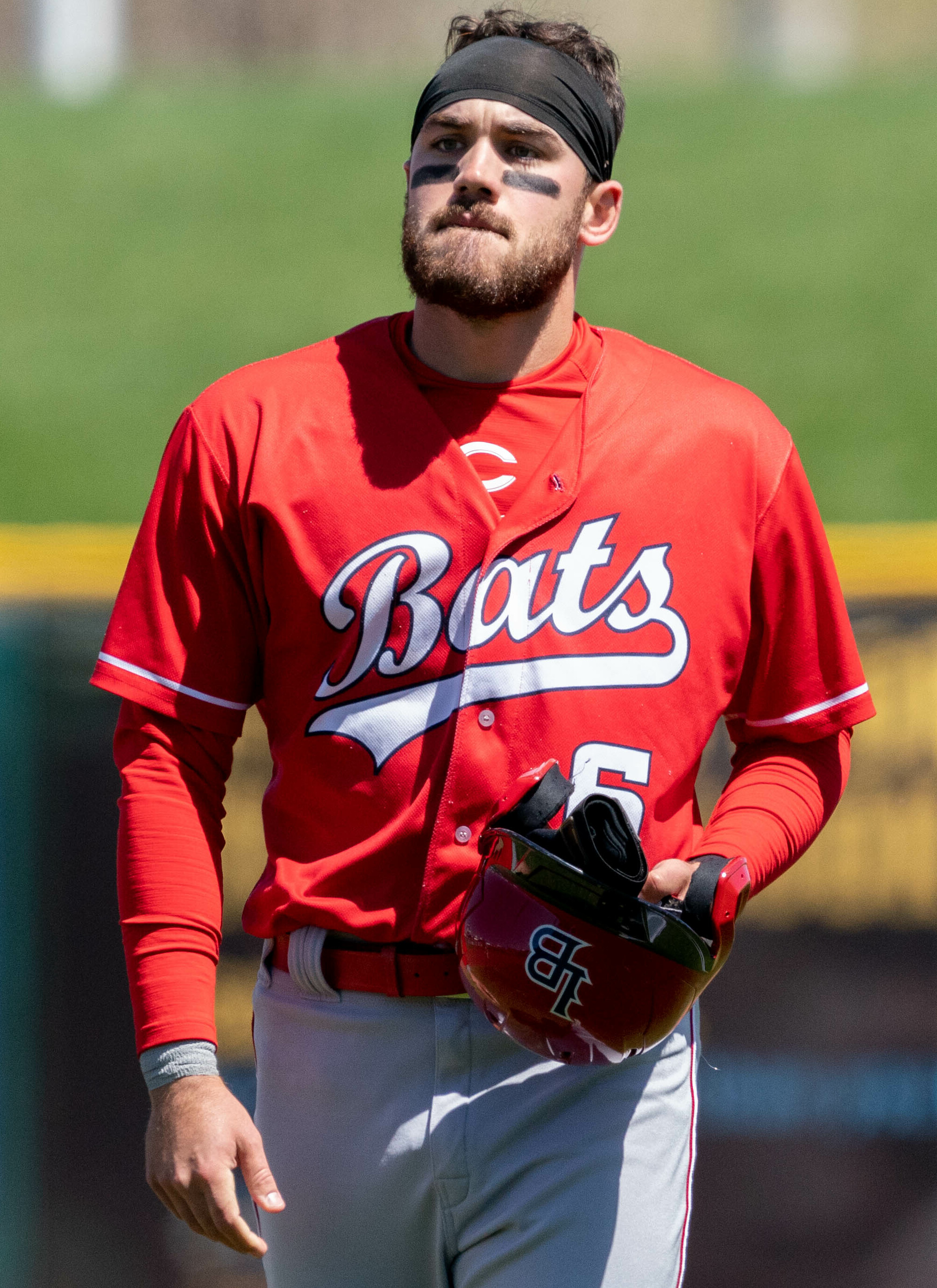
Siani with the Louisville Bats in 2023

The Cincinnati Reds selected Siani in the fourth round of the 2018 Major League Baseball draft. He signed with the team and received a $2 million signing bonus.

After signing, the Reds assigned Siani to the Greeneville Reds of the Low-A Appalachian League, where he slashed .288/.351/ .386 with two home runs and 13 RBIs in 46 games played. He spent the 2019 season with the Dayton Dragons of the Single-A Midwest League and hit .253 with six home runs, 39 RBIs and 45 stolen bases. Siani returned to Dayton, now a High-A team, in 2021 and batted .216. He was assigned to the Double-A Chattanooga Lookouts at the start of the 2022 season. Siani batted .252 with 12 home runs, 19 doubles, seven triples, 49 RBIs and 49 stolen bases in 121 games before receiving a late-season promotion to the Triple-A Louisville Bats.

The Reds selected Siani's contract on September 22, 2022, and promoted him to the active roster. He made his major league debut later that day, starting in center field and batting 0–for–3 in a 5–1 loss against the Milwaukee Brewers.

Siani was optioned to Triple-A Louisville to begin the 2023 season. He hit .228 in 108 games for Louisville, and was hitless in three games for the Reds prior to being designated for assignment on August 31.

=== St. Louis Cardinals ===
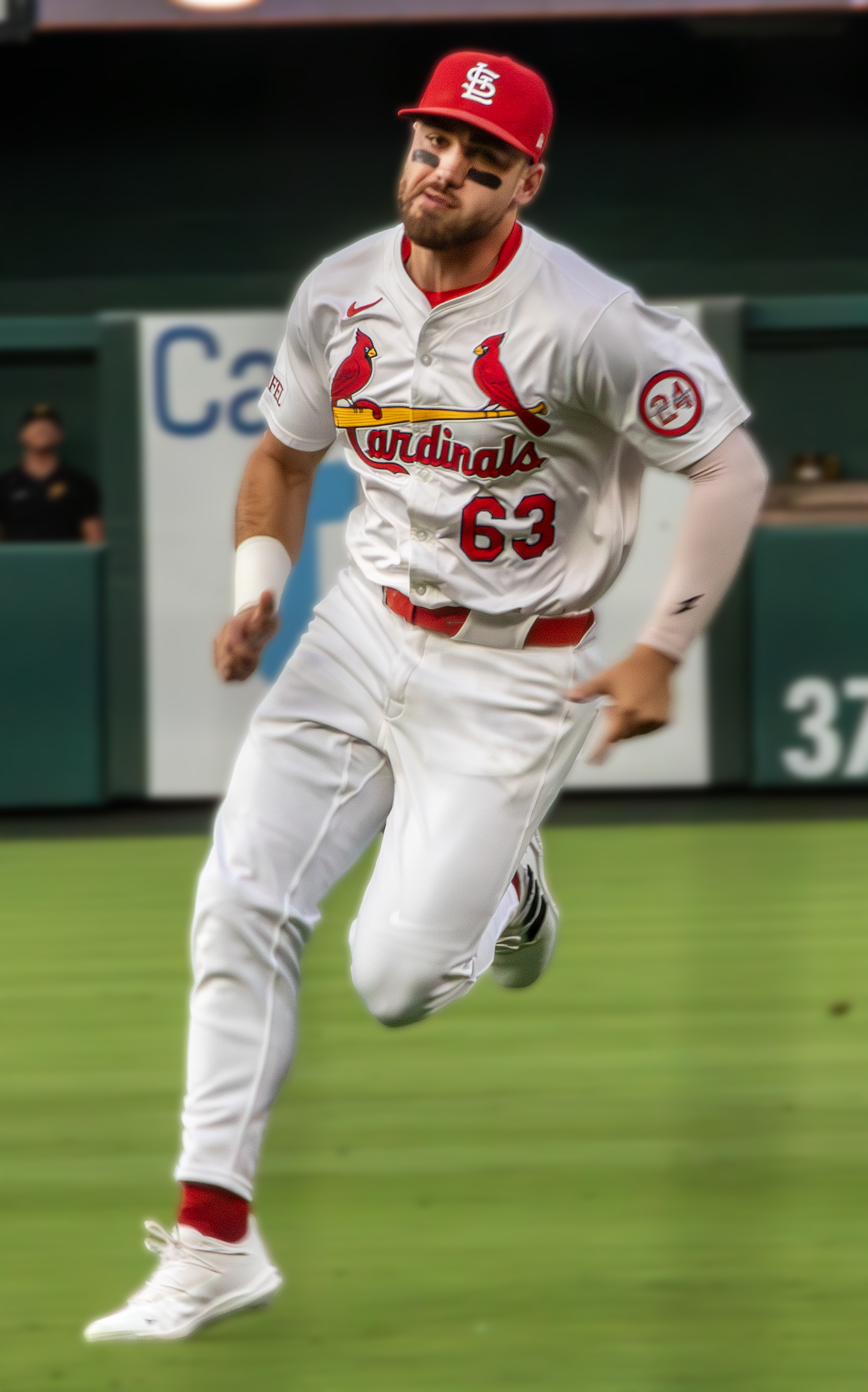
Siani in 2024

On September 2, 2023, Siani was claimed off waivers by the St. Louis Cardinals. He made five appearances for the Cardinals down the stretch, going 0-for-5 with a stolen base.

Siani made 124 appearances for the Cardinals during the 2024 season, batting .228/.285/.285 with two home runs, 20 RBI, and 20 stolen bases. He played in 19 games for St. Louis in 2025, going 4-for-17 (.235) with two walks.

=== Los Angeles Dodgers ===
On November 6, 2025, Siani was claimed off waivers by the Atlanta Braves who then designated him for assignment following the signing of Mike Yastrzemski on December 10. On December 12, Siani was claimed off waivers by the Los Angeles Dodgers, who designated him themselves following the signing of Kyle Tucker on January 21, 2026. Two days later, he was claimed off waivers by the New York Yankees who also designated him for assignment on January 28, following the acquisition of Angel Chivilli. On February 3, he returned to the Dodgers via another waiver claim. Siani was optioned to the Triple-A Oklahoma City Comets to begin the regular season. He hit .225 in 29 games for the Comets and was then designated for assignment on May 11.

=== Baltimore Orioles ===
On May 18, 2026, Siani was claimed off of waivers by the Baltimore Orioles. He recorded one appearance for the Orioles against the Los Angeles Dodgers on June 21, and grounded out against Miguel Rojas in his only at-bat. Siani was designated for assignment by Baltimore the following day. He cleared waivers and was sent outright to the Triple-A Norfolk Tides on June 25. Siani was released by the Orioles organization on August 3.

=== Detroit Tigers ===
On August 14, 2026, Siani signed a minor league contract with the Detroit Tigers. In 18 games with Triple-A Toledo Mud Hens he batted .140/.194/.281 with 2 home runs, 5 RBIs and 2 stolen bases. He elected free agency on November 2.

== Personal life ==
Siani's younger brother, Sammy, plays in the Seattle Mariners organization.
