= William Penn Charter School =

Private school in Philadelphia, Pennsylvania, US

- The William Penn Charter School for Boys and Girls in 2006

Location
- 3000 West School House Lane; Philadelphia, Pennsylvania; United States; 40°01′21″N 75°11′11″W

Information
- Motto: Good Instruction Is Better Than Riches
- Established: 1689; 337 years ago
- Founder: William Penn
- Category: Independent
- Head of school: Dennis Bisgaard
- Grades: Pre-K – 12
- Gender: Coeducational
- Enrollment: 1,016
- Campus: Urban
- Colors: Blue and yellow
- Mascot: Quaker
- Nickname: PC
- Rival: Germantown Academy
- Accreditation: Pennsylvania Association of Private Academic Schools (PAPAS)
- Newspaper: The Mirror
- Yearbook: The Class Record
- Tuition: $47,200
- Affiliations: Religious Society of Friends
- Website: http://penncharter.com

William Penn Charter School is a private school in Philadelphia, Pennsylvania. It was founded in 1689 at the urging of William Penn as the "Public Grammar School" and chartered in 1689 to be operated by the "Overseers of the public School, founded by Charter in the town and county of Philadelphia" in Pennsylvania. It is the oldest Quaker school in the world, the oldest elementary school in Pennsylvania, and the fifth oldest elementary school in the United States following The Collegiate School ("claimed" 1628), Boston Latin School (1635), Hartford Public High School (1638), and Roxbury Latin (1645).

== History ==
Penn Charter is among the first schools in the United States to offer education to all religions (1689), financial aid (1701), matriculation to girls (1754), and education to all races (1770). The "Charter" in the school's name does not, as might be assumed, mean that it is a modern "charter school". Rather, it is a reference to the historic document signed by William Penn to establish the first Quaker school in America. Originally located on the east side of Fourth Street below Chestnut, the school officially consolidated in 1874 as an all-boys College-preparatory school at 12th and Market Streets. Penn Charter moved to its current forty-seven-acre East Falls campus in 1925. In 1980, the school became fully co-educational by allowing girls to continue past the second grade, and graduated the first co-ed senior class in 1992.

== Traditions ==
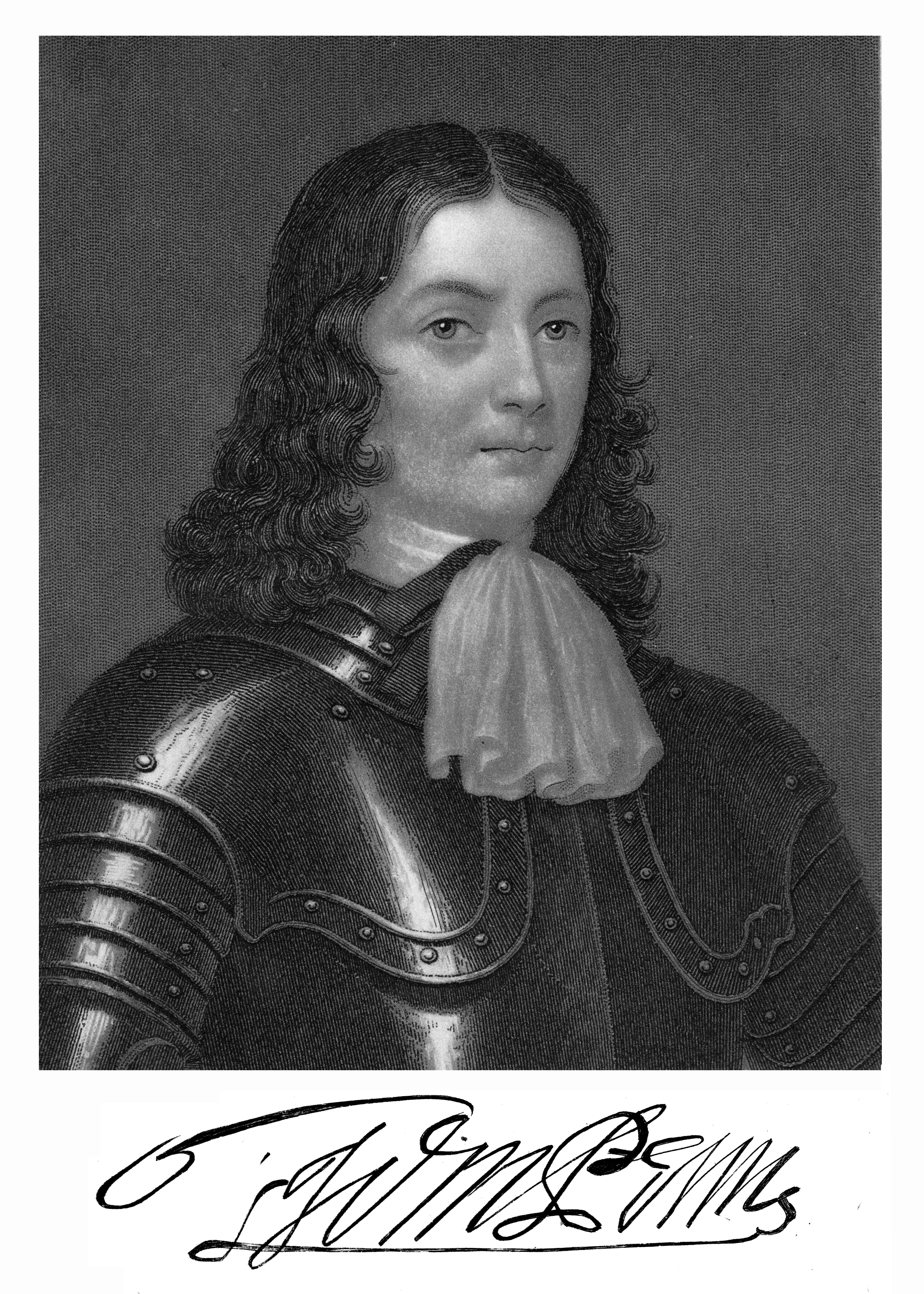
William Penn as a young man in 1666

While the school is not under the care of a formal monthly Meeting, in keeping with the school's Quaker heritage, the Overseers, a board of 21 trustees established by William Penn, still governs the school affairs through Quaker consensus. Jeffrey Reinhold is the current clerk of the Overseers. All students attend a weekly meeting for worship. Faculty meetings and all-school assemblies, and some classes begin with a moment of silence.

Service-learning is integral to the school and incorporated into the pre-K to 12 curriculum. The school's Center for Public Purpose engages students in service and community-based work by addressing Philadelphia's most pressing social issues, particularly education, food insecurity, and poverty. To earn activity credit, many Upper School students complete 40 hours of community service a year; a van carrying students leaves campus after school every day to perform service at various locations throughout the Philadelphia area.

Color Day, celebrated on the Friday before Memorial Day, is a tradition in which two teams sporting the school's colors, blue and yellow, compete against each other in playful contests, concluding with a 12th-grade rope pull.

The school's Senior Stairs are a central stairway that only current seniors, faculty, and alumni can use during school hours.

A Penn Charter graduate is known as an "OPC." The honorific "OPC 1689" is bestowed rarely by the Overseers upon significant faculty and staff in recognition of their service to Old Penn Charter.

== Activities ==
The school newspaper, The Mirror, is the oldest secondary school student newspaper in the United States, having been published since 1777.

The Upper School's Quakers Dozen is the school's select, audition-based a cappella group. They biannually tour all over the country during spring break, and often perform at school events like Commencement.

In the summer months, the school runs a day camp for children.

== Sports ==
Penn Charter is a member of the Inter-Academic League (Inter-Ac), the nation's oldest high school sports league, and shares the nation's oldest continuous football rivalry with Germantown Academy, celebrated every year since 1886 during PC/GA Day. As of 2025, the game has been played 139 times, more times than the Army–Navy Game (117) and just two fewer times than the Harvard–Yale Game (132).

== Campus ==
On the 47-acre (190,000 m^{2}) campus, the three divisions of the school (Lower, Middle, and Upper Schools) have their own designated buildings. The Upper School building was built in 1925 when PC moved to Schoolhouse Lane. In addition to the three academic buildings, there are also various buildings across the campus, like the GAC, which holds the pool and a gym, the squash courts near the tennis courts, and the Kurtz, a 600+ seat theater built in 2010. The Kurtz has four recording studios, a Broadway-sized stage with an underground orchestra pit, a choir and band room, and multiple multi-purpose rooms. The campus also boasts a newly added state-of-the-art athletics building, the Graham Athletics and Wellness Center. It holds two full-sized basketball courts with an overhead bridge that separates the two, a college-level weight room, an athletic trainer's room with a hot and cold tub, two locker rooms for Upper School students (boys and girls), as well as two visitor locker rooms and two Middle School locker rooms, a snack stand for students, a wrestling room, and many multipurpose rooms.

== Leadership ==
John Flagg Gummere, scion of prominent Quaker educators, was headmaster from 1941 to 1968. He was a noted Latin scholar (Ph.D., Penn) and author of several widely used textbooks. He was followed by Wilbert L. Braxton, a longtime dedicated Penn Charter faculty member and administrator. Braxton was headmaster from 1968 until 1976. He was followed by Head of School Earl J. Ball III. After 31 years as head, Ball retired in June 2007. Darryl J. Ford, former director of the Penn Charter Middle School, was appointed as head of school by the Overseers after a national search. Ford was the school's first African-American head. On March 17, 2022, Ford announced his resignation. Later that year, on October 22, 2022, the Board of Trustees announced the selection of Karen Warren Coleman as the next head of school, who started in the fall of 2023. Coleman is the first woman to serve as head of school.

== In popular culture ==
The ABC show The Goldbergs features a fictional school that the Goldberg children attend called William Penn Academy, which is based on William Penn Charter School. The show's creator, Adam F. Goldberg, is an alumnus of William Penn Charter School, an OPC 1994. The show features Germantown Academy as the chief rival of the school. The show also features actual teachers and students who attended the school in the '80s and '90s.

Schooled, a spin-off of The Goldbergs, also features the fictional William Penn Academy as the primary setting for the show.

== Notable alumni ==
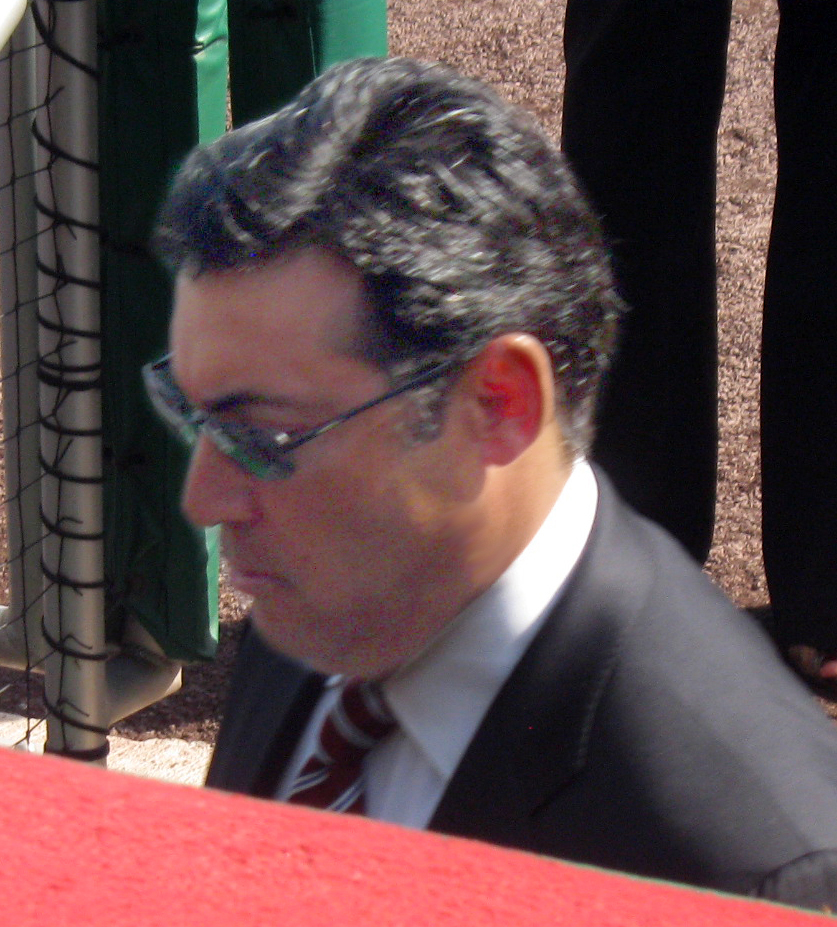
Rubén Amaro, Jr.

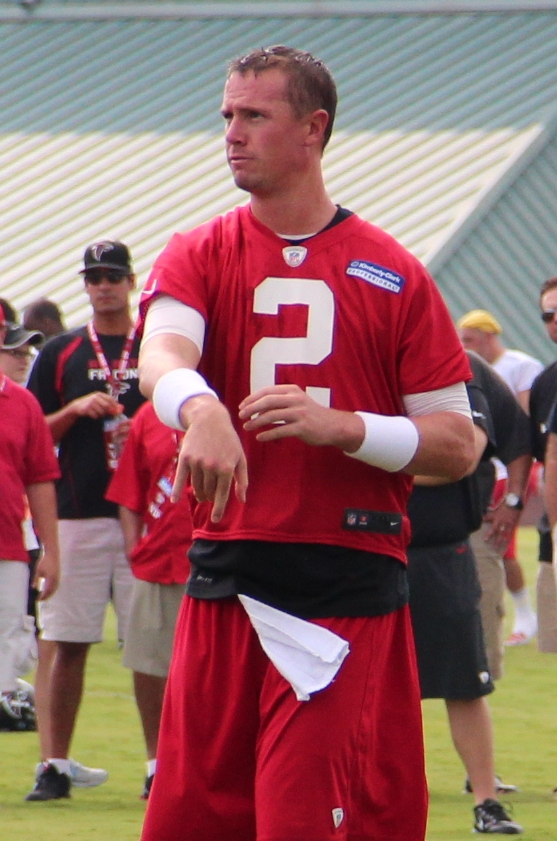
Matt Ryan

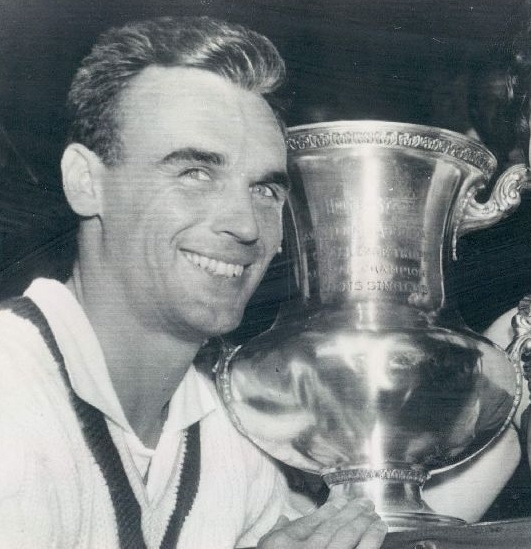
Vic Seixas

Penn Charter has numerous alumni in the arts, sciences, government, and business, including Rubén Amaro Jr., David Sirota, Matt Ryan, Robert Picardo, Adam F. Goldberg, Mark Gubicza, Michael Siani, Leicester Bodine Holland, Richard B. Fisher, Arthur Ingersoll Meigs, Richard Lester and Vic Seixas.
