= The Baldwin School =

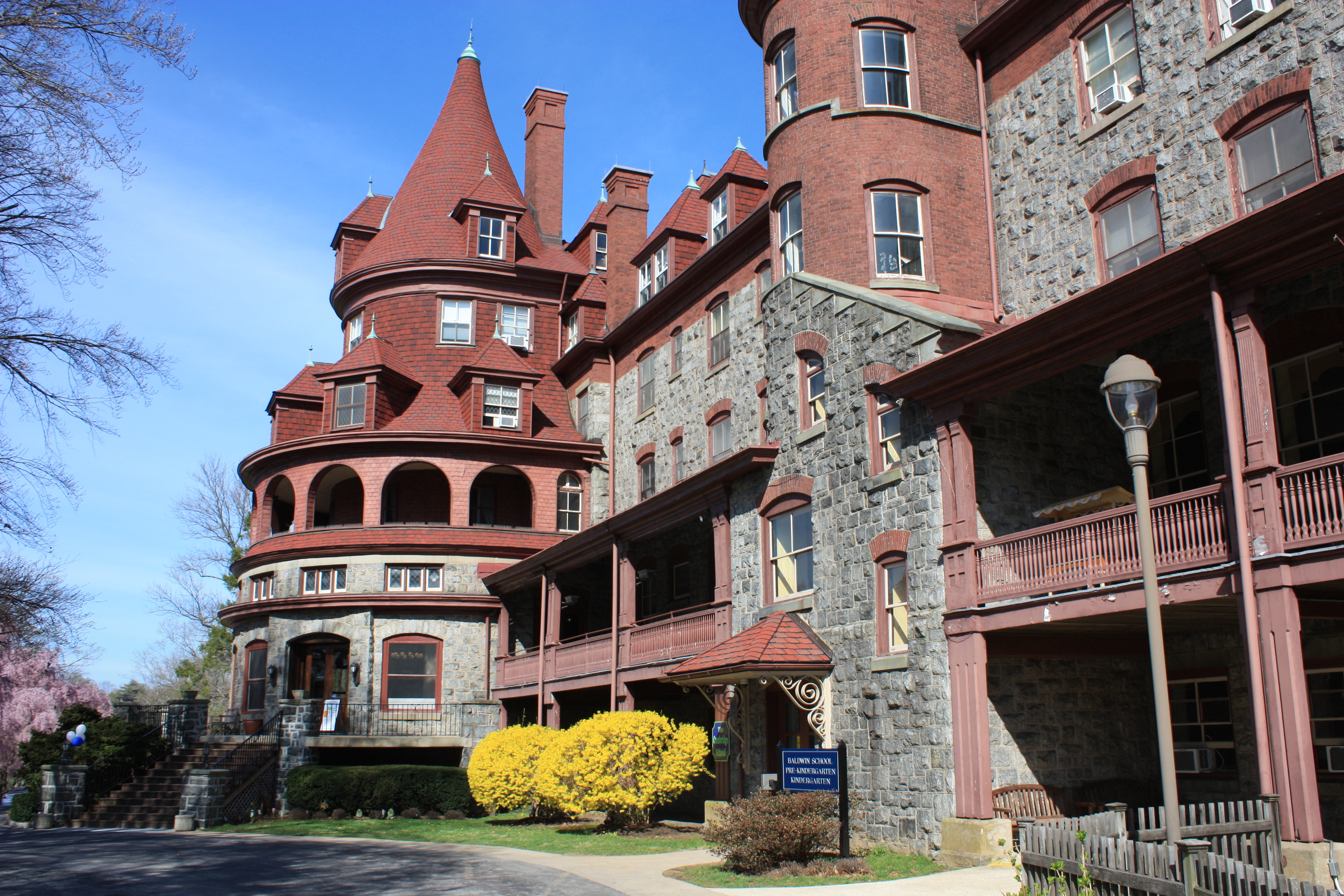
- Building of the school

Location
- 701 Montgomery Avenue; Bryn Mawr, Pennsylvania 19010; United States; 40°1′23″N 75°18′46″W

Information
- Other names: Baldwin School; Baldwin
- Type: Private school
- Motto: Latin: Disce Verum Laborem
- Established: 1888; 138 years ago
- Founder: Florence Baldwin
- CEEB code: 390480
- NCES School ID: 01197719
- Head of school: Lynne Macziewski
- Teaching staff: 78.6 (on an FTE basis)
- Grades: PK–12
- Gender: Girls
- Enrollment: 568 (2026–2027)
- Student to teacher ratio: 7.0
- Campus type: Suburban
- Colors: Blue and gray
- Athletics conference: Inter-Academic League
- Mascot: Winnie the Bear
- Nickname: Baldwin Bears
- Publication: Echoes; Florilège; El Pimiento; The Roman Candle; The Baldwin Review
- Newspaper: The Hourglass
- Website: www.baldwinschool.org
- Bryn Mawr Hotel
- U.S. National Register of Historic Places
- Pennsylvania state historical marker
- Area: 1.5 acres (0.61 ha)
- Built: 1890
- Architect: Furness, Evans, & Co.; Frank Furness
- Architectural style: Renaissance, French Chateau
- NRHP reference No.: 79002300

Significant dates
- Added to NRHP: April 27, 1979
- Designated PHMC: April 11, 2000

The Baldwin School (simply referred to as Baldwin School or Baldwin) is a private school for girls in Bryn Mawr, Pennsylvania, United States. It was founded in 1888 by Florence Baldwin. It is accredited by the Pennsylvania Association of Independent Schools (PAIS). The school occupies a former nineteenth-century resort hotel that was designed by Victorian architect Frank Furness, a landmark of the Philadelphia Main Line. The Baldwin School is not religiously associated.

== History ==
In 1888, Florence Baldwin founded "Miss Baldwin's School for Girls, Preparatory for Bryn Mawr College" in her mother's house at the corner of Montgomery and Morris Avenues in Bryn Mawr, Pennsylvania.

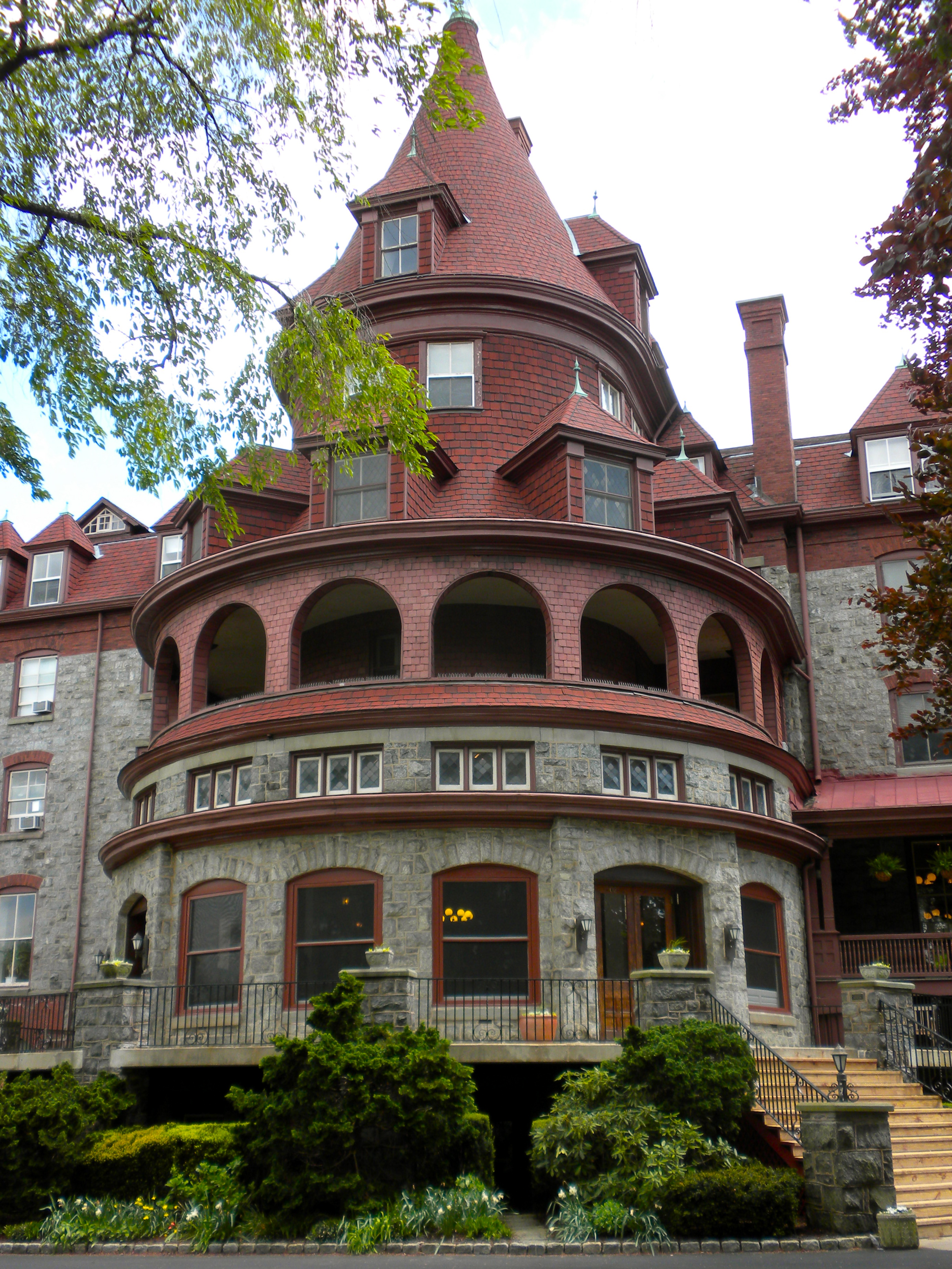
"The Residence" (formerly Bryn Mawr Hotel) by Furness, Evans & Company. The second Bryn Mawr Hotel opened May 30, 1891.

The school's building, the second Bryn Mawr Hotel, was designed by Furness, Evans & Company and was built between 1890 and 1891. It is a five-story, L-shaped, stone-and-brick building that was created in a Renaissance Revival / châteauesque style, and features a large semi-circular section at the main entrance, topped by a conical roof and finial. It has a steeply pitched red roof with a variety of dormers, chimneys, towers, finials, and skylights.

Today the school has made many additions to "The Residence," but maintained the general style of the original building. It is now used for dining, art studios, theater performances, housing, the Middle School, and an Early Childhood Center.

A two-story science building opened in 1961; it was enlarged in 1995 to accommodate the increasing number of students. The Upper School inhabits the three-story schoolhouse, which was built in 1926. It was renovated in 1997.

Renovations completed in 2014 to "The Residence" specifically support the pre-kindergarten and kindergarten classes. In 2015, a performing arts center was built called the Simpson Center.

The school formally opened a new athletic center in 2008. It has a six-lane swimming pool, gymnasium, three-lane jogging track, four squash courts, a fitness center, five tennis courts, and a practice field.

== Student body ==
Students of color represent 40% of the student body.

== Academics ==
The Baldwin School provides PreK through 12th grade education, with a focus on tailoring learning experiences specifically for girls. It has a history of ranking on various "top ranked" lists such as top-ranked all-girls high school in the Philadelphia area, as well as best K-12 schools in Pennsylvania.

=== College matriculation ===
100% of graduates go on to college, with average SAT scores of 1410 and average ACT scores of 31.

== Athletics ==
Baldwin has 16 athletic sports and more than 35 teams. The Baldwin School competes in the Inter-Academic League, most commonly known as the Inter-Ac, and is a member of the Pennsylvania Independent Schools Athletic Association.

Interscholastic varsity sports are basketball, cross-country, field hockey, golf, indoor track, lacrosse, rowing, soccer, softball, squash, swimming and diving, tennis, and volleyball.

Baldwin has tennis, softball, squash, and lacrosse teams.

=== Squash ===
Baldwin is best known for its squash program. Each class regularly contains a couple of nationally ranked squash players, many of whom compete internationally. Baldwin's longstanding rival in squash has been Greenwich Academy in Connecticut. In 2015, the upper school team defeated Greenwich in the US Squash Championships at Trinity College. The school's middle school team won the national championship against Greenwich in 2016 and 2018. The upper school team again faced Greenwich in the 2018 national championships, but lost 1–6. However, in 2019, Baldwin was able to defeat Greenwich 5–2 in the national championships. This ended a three-year streak of Greenwich being the reigning national champions.
