= Agnes Irwin School =

Girls school in Rosemont, Pennsylvania, US

Coordinates: 40.0283°N 75.3502°W

The Agnes Irwin School
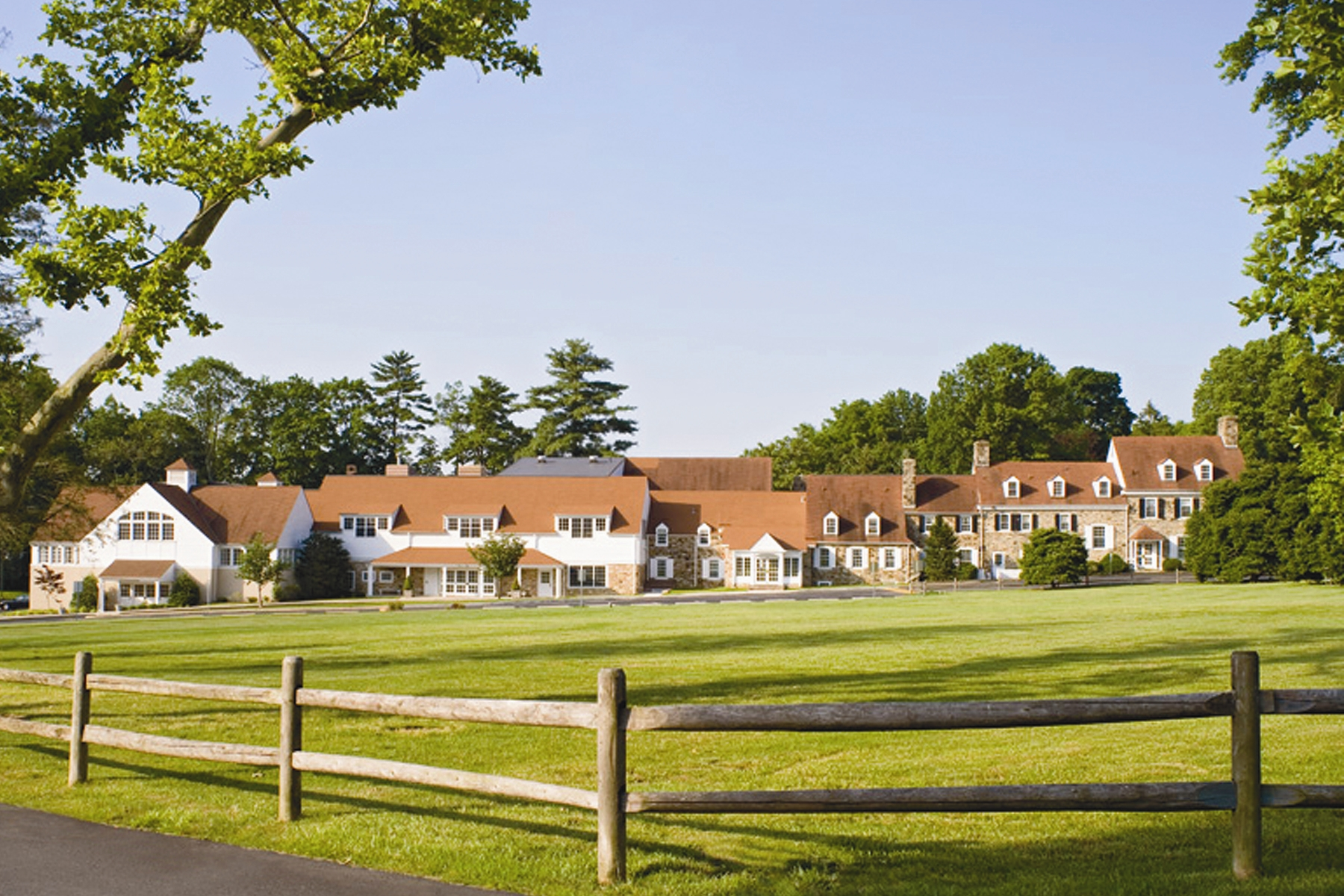
- Rosemont, Pennsylvania; United States

Information
- Type: Private, Independent, All-Girls
- Established: 1869
- Head of School: Sally B. Keidel
- Enrollment: 635
- Average class size: 15
- Student to teacher ratio: 6 to 1
- Campus: Suburban
- Colors: Blue and Gold
- Athletics: Lacrosse, Squash, Tennis, Cross-Country, Swimming, Soccer, Field Hockey, Golf, Rowing, Softball, Track and Field, Basketball, Volleyball
- Athletics conference: Inter-Academic League
- Mascot: Owl
- Website: www.agnesirwin.org

The Agnes Irwin School is a non-sectarian college preparatory day school for girls from pre-kindergarten through grade 12. It was founded in 1869 by Agnes Irwin in Philadelphia. Irwin, a great-great-granddaughter of Benjamin Franklin, later became the first dean of Radcliffe College. In 1933, the campus moved to Wynnewood, Pennsylvania, and then to its present location in Rosemont in 1961.

== Location and campus ==
The campus in Rosemont, is 10 miles (16 km) west of Philadelphia. It is in Radnor Township. The campus sits on eighteen-acres.

== Extracurricular ==
Fourteen varsity sports including basketball, crew, cross country, field hockey, golf, lacrosse, soccer, softball, squash, swimming and diving, tennis, track, and volleyball. Performing arts include dance, choral and instrumental groups, and dramatic and musical productions. Visual arts include studio art, ceramics, photography, and media arts. There are over 50 clubs, ranging from community service to pre-professional.

== Accreditation and associations ==
Middle States Association of Colleges and Schools (1934), Pennsylvania Association of Independent Schools, National Coalition of Girls’ Schools, Cum Laude Society (1991), National Association of Independent Schools.

== Notable alumnae ==
- Tory Burch (1984), fashion designer
- Eleanor Stuart Childs, novelist and short story writer
- Dorothy Harrison Eustis (1904), established The Seeing Eye, an organization dedicated to training guide dogs to help the blind
- Caroline Furness Jayne, ethnologist
- Lindy Li, political analyst
- Mary Patterson McPherson (1953), executive officer of the American Philosophical Society, former vice president of the Mellon Foundation, former president of Bryn Mawr College
- Christine Ramsey, distance runner
- Kara Ross (1984), jewelry designer
