= Rosengren =

Rosengren is a Swedish-language surname.

== Geographical distribution ==
As of 2014, 62.5% of all known bearers of the surname Rosengren were residents of Sweden (frequency 1:2,789), 20.8% of the United States (1:307,186), 5.3% of Denmark (1:18,878), 2.7% of Finland (1:35,463), 2.7% of Australia (1:156,407), 2.5% of Canada (1:264,734) and 1.6% of Norway (1:57,137).

In Sweden, the frequency of the surname was higher than national average (1:2,789) in the following counties:

1. Skåne County (1:1,261)
2. Örebro County (1:1,558)
3. Kalmar County (1:1,608)
4. Halland County (1:2,389)
5. Norrbotten County (1:2,533)
6. Gotland County (1:2,658)

In Denmark, the frequency of the surname was higher than national average (1:18,878) in the following regions:

1. North Denmark Region (1:7,481)
2. Region Zealand (1:11,129)
3. Capital Region of Denmark (1:18,725)

In Finland, the frequency of the surname was higher than national average (1:35,463) in the following regions:

1. Satakunta (1:7,115)
2. Ostrobothnia (1:13,369)
3. Pirkanmaa (1:16,485)
4. Southwest Finland (1:18,998)

== People ==
- Bernt Rosengren (1937–2023), Swedish jazz tenor saxophonist
- Birgit Rosengren (1912–2011), Swedish film actress
- Björn Rosengren (politician) (born 1942), Swedish Social Democratic politician
- Cathrine Rosengren (born 1999), Danish para-badminton player
- Eric S. Rosengren (born 1957), president and chief executive officer of the Federal Reserve Bank of Boston
- Erik Rosengren (1908–1988), Swedish Army lieutenant general
- Håkan Rosengren, Swedish clarinet virtuoso
- John Rosengren (born 1964), American writer and author
- Otto Rosengren (born 2003), Swedish footballer
- Patrik Rosengren (born 1971), Swedish footballer
- Per Rosengren, (1951–), is a Swedish Left Party politician and teacher
- Rhonda Rosengren, New Zealand toxicology academic
- Sabina Rosengren Jacobsen, Swedish team handball player

== See also ==
- Roseingrave
- Rosengarten (disambiguation)
