= Rosengart =

Rosengart may refer to:

- Lucien Rosengart 1881 - 1976, founder and till 1936 proprietor of the Rosengart automaking business
- Automobiles L. Rosengart, an automobile manufacturer between 1927 and 1955
- Rosengart, Saskatchewan

== See also ==
- Rosengarten (disambiguation)
