= Rosengarten =

Rosengarten may refer to:

- the German word for "rose garden"
- Rosengarten, Lower Saxony, a municipality in Lower Saxony, Germany
- Rosengarten, Baden-Württemberg, a municipality in Baden-Württemberg, Germany
- Mannheimer Rosengarten, congress centre in Baden-Württemberg, Germany
- Rosengarten group, a massif in the Dolomites
- Rosengarten zu Worms, a 13th-century German epic about Dietrich von Bern.
- Laurin, also known as the kleiner Rosengarten, another 13th-century German epic about Dietrich.

== People with the surname ==
- Adolph G. Rosengarten (1870–1946), American chemist from Pennsylvania
- Albrecht Rosengarten (1809–1893), German architect
- David Rosengarten (born 1950)
- Capt. Joseph George Rosengarten (1835–1921), Philadelphia lawyer, historian and US Civil War veteran.
- Roger Rosengarten (born 2002), American football player
- Theodore Rosengarten (born 1944), American historian

== See also ==
- Rossgarten
- Rose Garden (disambiguation)
