= Kohlhöfen Synagogue =

Former Orthodox synagogue in Hamburg, Germany

- Synagoge Kohlhöfen
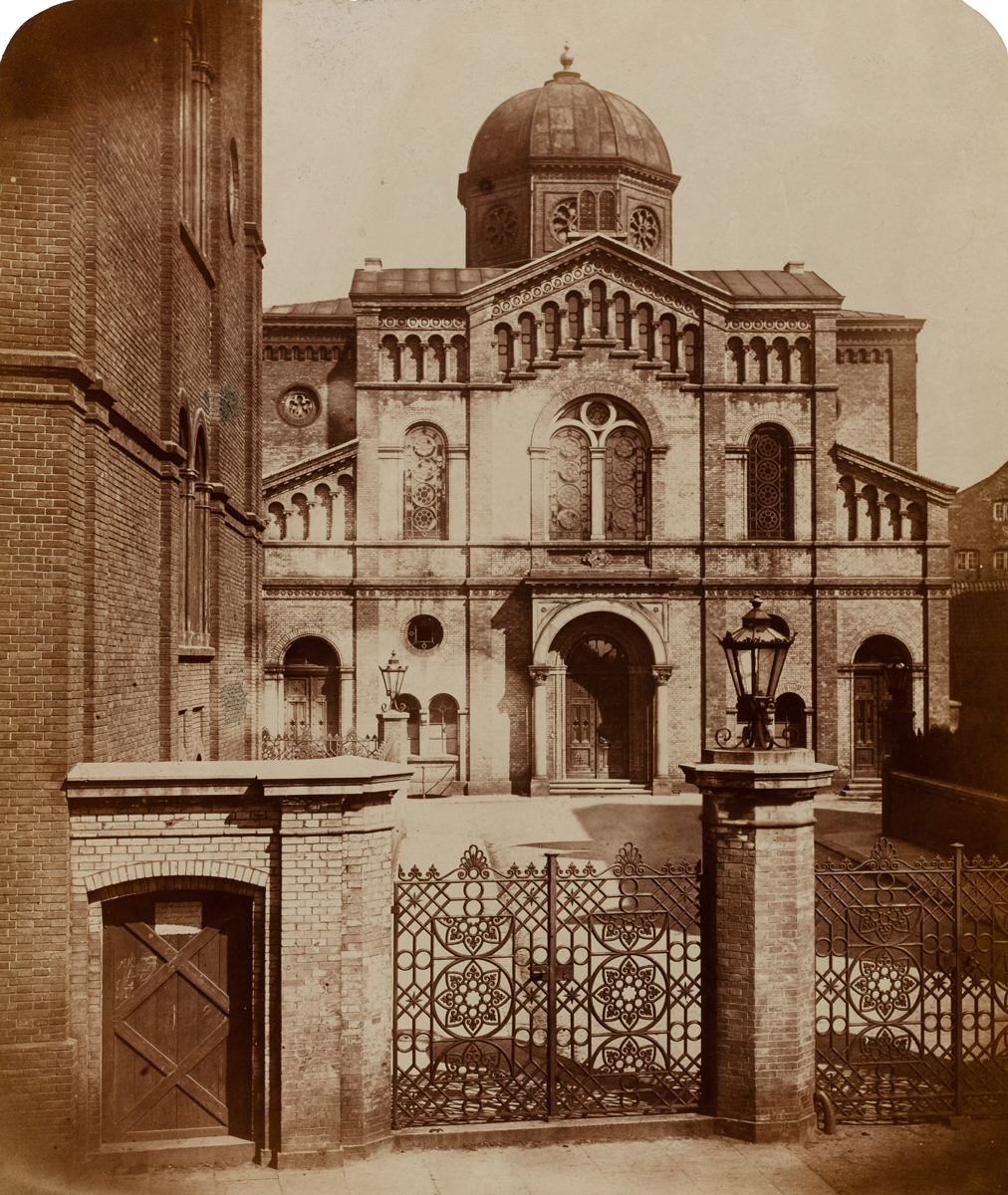
- The synagogue around 1870

Religion
- Affiliation: Orthodox Judaism
- Ecclesiastical or organisational status: Synagogue
- Status: Demolished

Location
- Location: Kohlhöfen, Neustadt, Hamburg
- Country: Germany
- Interactive map of Kohlhöfen Synagogue
- Coordinates: 53.552592°N 9.980478°E

Architecture
- Architect: Albrecht Rosengarten
- Type: Synagogue
- Style: Rundbogenstil
- Groundbreaking: 1857
- Completed: 1859
- Destroyed: 1934

The Kohlhöfen Synagogue (German: Synagoge Kohlhöfen) was an Orthodox synagogue in the Neustadt district of Hamburg, Germany. Built between 1857 and 1859 to designs by Albrecht Rosengarten, it was the first synagogue in Hamburg whose façade was visible from the street. It was sold to the city and demolished in 1934.

== History ==
=== Construction ===
The growth of Hamburg's Ashkenazi community in the mid-19th century created a need for a larger synagogue. The existing places of worship on Elbstraße, known as the Altonaer Schule, and Neuer Steinweg no longer provided sufficient accommodation.

The commission was entrusted to Albrecht Rosengarten, who had previously designed the synagogue in Kassel. Construction of the Kohlhöfen Synagogue took place between 1857 and 1859.

The original plans placed the synagogue behind two buildings belonging to the Talmud Torah School. During the planning process, these buildings were moved towards the sides of the site, opening a view of the synagogue through the entrance courtyard. This made it the first synagogue in Hamburg with a façade visible from the street.

=== Congregational life ===
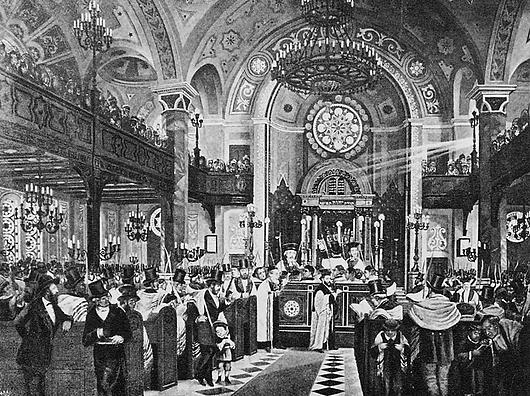
A Sukkot service with Chief Rabbi Anschel Stern

The synagogue served the Orthodox section of Hamburg's Deutsch-Israelitische Gemeinde (German-Israelite Congregation). The Deutsch-Israelitischer Synagogenverband, established in 1868 as a separate religious association within the congregation, was responsible for services at Kohlhöfen and Elbstraße. It administered its own finances and employed its own religious staff.

=== Decline and demolition ===
From the late 19th century, increasing numbers of Jewish residents moved from Neustadt to newer districts, particularly the Grindel quarter. Attendance at Kohlhöfen declined, and the Bornplatz Synagogue, opened in 1906, became the community's principal synagogue.

A sale of the Kohlhöfen property to the city was contemplated as early as 1914 but did not take place until 1934. The synagogue was subsequently demolished as part of the redevelopment of the neighbourhood.

== Architecture ==
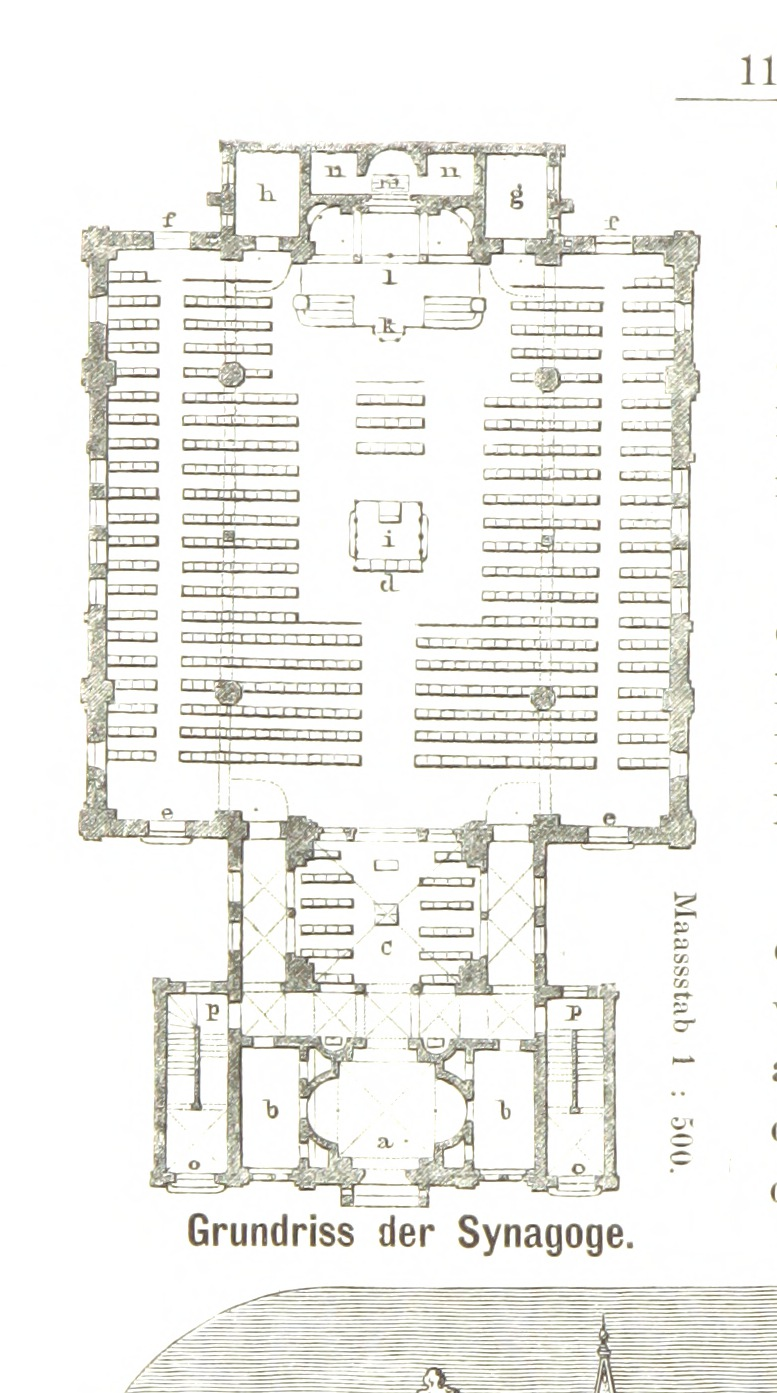
Ground plan published in 1869

The synagogue was built of yellow brick in the Rundbogenstil, a 19th-century architectural style characterised by round arches. A prominent dome rose above a drum. The interior was fully painted, and its arrangement followed traditional Ashkenazi synagogue practice.

Although visible from the street through its courtyard, the building had no exterior symbols or inscriptions identifying it as a Jewish place of worship. The College of Charleston's exhibition The Life of the Synagogue discusses this visibility as an expression of Jewish aspirations towards civic equality and public recognition.

== Gallery ==
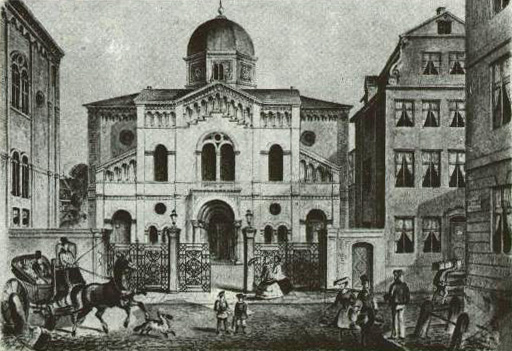
Depiction of the synagogue, c. 1860

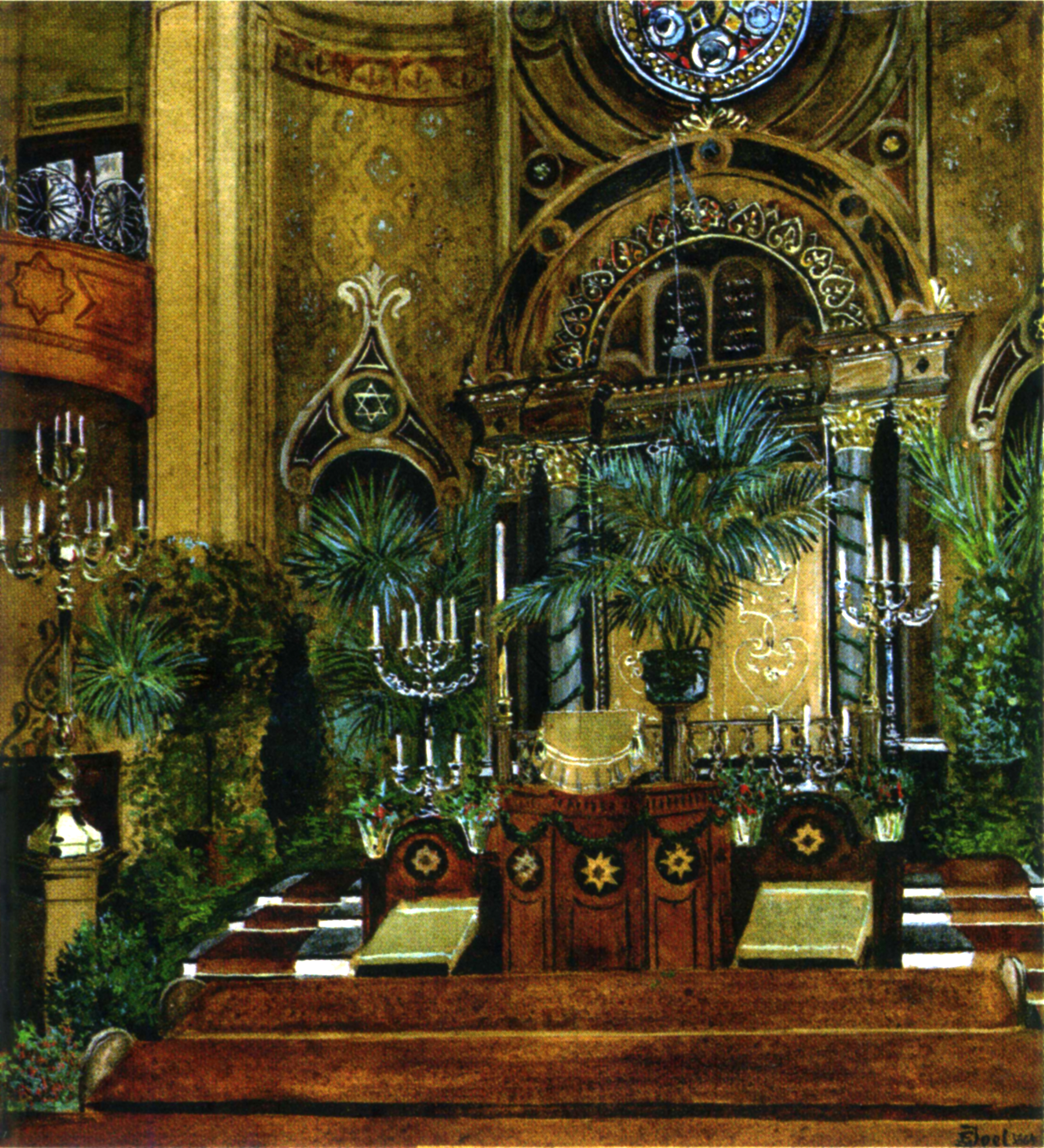
Interior of the synagogue, 1920

Hüttenstraße and Peterstraße, c. 1900

Illustration of the synagogue from an 1868 architectural publication

Memorial plaque for the former synagogue

== See also ==
- History of the Jews in Hamburg
- Bornplatz Synagogue
