= Roseingrave =

Roseingrave is a surname. Notable people with the surname include:

- Carina Roseingrave, Irish camogie player
- Daniel Roseingrave (died 1727), Anglo-Irish organist and composer
- Ralph Roseingrave (c. 1695 – 1747), Anglo-Irish organist, son of Daniel Roseingrave
- Siobhan Roseingrave, Irish general election candidate, daughter of Tomás Roseingrave
- Thomas Roseingrave (1690/91 – 1766), Anglo-Irish organist and composer, son of Daniel Roseingrave
- Tomás Roseingrave (1918–1993), Irish social scientist
