= Joseph George Rosengarten =

American lawyer

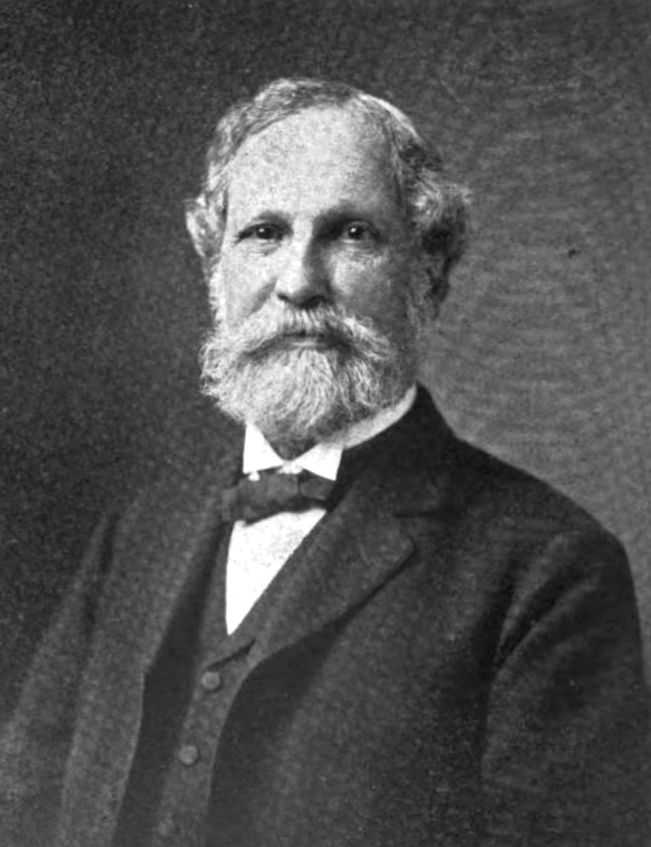
- Born: July 14, 1835; Philadelphia, Pennsylvania
- Died: January 14, 1921 (aged 85); Philadelphia, Pennsylvania
- Resting place: Laurel Hill Cemetery
- Education: University of Pennsylvania
- Occupations: Lawyer, historian, Civil War veteran
- Relatives: Adolph G. Rosengarten (nephew)

Joseph George Rosengarten (July 14, 1835 – January 14, 1921) was a Philadelphia lawyer, historian, and Civil War veteran. He served on the staff of General John F. Reynolds.

== Early life and education ==
Joseph George Rosengarten was born in Philadelphia, Pennsylvania, the child of German immigrants George D. and Elizabeth (Bennett) Rosengarten. His father, one of Philadelphia's wealthiest men by the 1890s, was an accountant and manufacturer, who created a large chemical establishment and had an interest in numerous other profitable business ventures, including the Pennsylvania Railroad.

Rosengarten received his early education in private schools in Philadelphia, and for a time came under the influence of a scholarly man in York, Pennsylvania, the Rev. Charles West Thomson, who aroused in him a liking for literature that became "an abiding habit." He completed his secondary education at an academy then affiliated with the University of Pennsylvania, studying under Dr. Samuel Crawford.

In 1849, at just fourteen years of age, Rosengarten was admitted to the University of Pennsylvania, graduating three years later with the degree of A.B. in the Class of 1852. In 1855, Rosengarten received the degree of M.A. from the same university. After graduation he studied law in the offices of Henry M. Phillips, a prominent member of the Philadelphia Bar, and in 1856, Rosengarten was admitted to practice.

Rosengarten's father then arranged for him to travel abroad to further his studies:

The elder Rosengarten, realizing the extraordinary value of foreign study and travel, sent four of his sons abroad to prepare themselves for their future careers. In pursuance of this plan Joseph Rosengarten went...to study history and Roman Law at the University of Heidelberg and to engage in travel.

While abroad he was "thrown into contact with men of distinction," including Ludwig Häusser and de:Adolph von Vangerow, who served respectively as professors of history and law at the University of Heidelberg. During this period, Rosengarten also met the eminent British jurist James Fitzjames Stephen, and his brother, author and critic Leslie Stephen.

In 1857, Rosengarten returned to the United States and began practicing law in Philadelphia. His law partners were Henry Schell Hagert and George Junkin.

== Witnesses John Brown's raid on Harpers Ferry ==
In 1859, Rosengarten witnessed abolitionist John Brown's famous raid on Harpers Ferry, Virginia. Rosengarten had been traveling at the time as a guest with the Directors of the Pennsylvania Railroad, his father being one of the directors. His train stopped short of Harpers Ferry, he walked into town, and witnessed the attack made by Lee's men on the engine house where John Brown had sought refuge. He later saw John Brown lying wounded. Rosengarten wrote a vivid account of what he had witnessed, that was published in the Atlantic Monthly in 1865.

== Civil war service ==
On September 2, 1862, a year after the outbreak of the Civil War, Rosengarten was commissioned a first lieutenant in Company D of the 121st Pennsylvania Infantry. The regiment was soon ordered to Washington, D.C., and upon its arrival, went into camp at Arlington Heights. Arms and equipments were not delivered until some weeks after its arrival, but drill and instruction were immediately commenced, and prosecuted with vigor, the regiment becoming noted for good discipline at the drills and reviews of General Casey's Provisional Brigade, to which it was then attached.

Rosengarten fought with distinction at the Battle of Fredericksburg, "distinguishing himself for bravery, picking up the colors after four sergeants had been disabled and carrying them successfully through the engagement." As a result, he gained the notice of Major General John F. Reynolds, and was offered the post of Ordnance Officer and a position on General Reynolds' staff.

Rosengarten remained on Reynolds' staff, fighting under him at Chancellorsville and Gettysburg, until Reynolds was killed in action during the latter battle. (In one eyewitness's later account of Reynolds' July 1863 death, Rosengarten is referred to as "Major Adolph Rosengarten," his brother, an officer in the 15th Pennsylvania Cavalry, Army of the Cumberland, who had been killed in December 1862 at the Battle of Stones River.) Rosengarten was assigned the honor of escorting Reynolds' body to his final resting place in Lancaster, Pennsylvania. Due to his intimate association with Reynolds, Rosengarten was also chosen to deliver the address at the dedication of Reynolds' monument at Gettysburg in 1889.

== Later life ==
On September 6, 1863, Rosengarten received an honorable discharge from the military. In March 1865, he received the rank of Brevet Captain.

After receiving his discharge, Rosengarten returned to his law practice in Philadelphia. He was also employed as his father's business manager and legal representative, overseeing his father's numerous business ventures and investments.

Rosengarten maintained a lifelong interest in his alma mater the University of Pennsylvania, serving as president of the alumni association, and as a member of the board of trustees. He supported several other public institutions, among them the German Hospital, now Lankenau Medical Centerl, and the House of Refuge, the first institution in Pennsylvania established to reform juveniles charged with delinquency. Rosengarten served on the Board of Managers (1878), and later as vice president (1893-1910), and finally, as president (1911-1914) of the House of Refuge. At his urging, the institution was moved from Philadelphia to the outlying countryside, where, instead of being "treated as prisoners the boys and girls were placed in homes organized on the cottage system," provided with educational opportunities, plenty of fresh air, outdoor work and exercise.

Rosengarten served as a board member (1895-1911) and president (1899-1909) of the Free Library of Philadelphia, and it was largely through his efforts that the library received a bequest of five hundred thousand dollars from Andrew Carnegie. Carnegie remembered the kindness once shown to him, years before, while he was employed as secretary to the president of the Pennsylvania Railroad, by Rosengarten's father. He was also a founding member of the Philobiblon Club of Philadelphia in 1893.

Rosengarten developed a close association with Anthony J. Drexel and, as a result, served from its founding in 1892 until 1909 as a member of the board of the Drexel Institute.

Rosengarten contributed frequently to newspapers and periodicals, including the New York Tribune, the Philadelphia Public Ledger, the North American Review, the Atlantic Monthly, the Penn Monthly, and The Nation. He also delivered numerous addresses before various literary and charitable associations, including one before the Historical Society of Pennsylvania on the "Life and Public Services of General John F. Reynolds" (Philadelphia, 1880).

Rosengarten was an active member of the American Philosophical Society. He contributed translations of Hessian soldier Stephan Popp's Revolutionary War diary and Achenwall's Observations on North America to a paper, "American History from German Archives," published in the Society's Proceedings for 1900.

Through his association with Henry C. Carey, Rosengarten became interested in social science, and was active in the establishment of the American Social Science Association, which later became the American Academy of Political and Social Science.

An amateur historian, Rosengarten was particularly interested in the subject of French and German immigration to the United States, and the role played by French and German immigrants in the foundation of the country. He authored numerous articles on the subject and two books: The German Soldier in the Wars of the United States (Philadelphia, 1886) and French Colonists and Exiles in the United States (Philadelphia, 1907).

In 1904, Rosengarten was awarded the Cross of the Legion of Honour by the Republic of France for helping to foster American interest in French culture. In 1907, he was awarded an honorary LL.D. degree by the University of Pennsylvania.

Rosengarten was also remembered for his large circle of influential friends and acquaintances:

Few men had [such] a large circle of acquaintance; and having a rare gift for friendship, he continued to maintain association with many of those with whom he was thrown into contact either in [Philadelphia] or through his frequent trips abroad. He knew the Darwins, father and son; he came into close touch with eminent writers and scholars like F. Max Müller, Thomas Hughes, Goldwin Smith, Herbert Spencer and Lord Bryce; he formed a friendship extending over many years with the de Rochambeau family and secured the passage of an act of Congress for the purchase of the letters of Washington to [the Comte de] Rochambeau. He knew the great trio of American literature, Longfellow, Emerson and Lowell; he had met all the Presidents from Buchanan to Wilson, and knew practically all the generals in the Civil War.

Rosengarten never married, living first with his parents and unmarried siblings, and later, after the death of his parents, with his sister, Fanny Rosengarten. He died in Philadelphia on January 14, 1921. He is buried beside his sister Fanny at Laurel Hill Cemetery in Philadelphia.

== Family ==
His brother Harry B. Rosengarten took over leadership of the family chemical business from their father. Harry's son Adolph G. Rosengarten II succeeded his father and built Chanticleer Garden in the Philadelphia suburbs. Another son, George D. Rosengarten II, also joined the family business, later serving terms as president of the American Institute of Chemical Engineers and the American Chemical Society. After the family business was merged with Merck & Co. in 1927, a third son, Frederic Rosengarten, served as chairman of the board of the resulting corporation until 1950. Adolph's son Adolph Jr. joined the board in 1934 and was elected vice chairman in 1971.
