= Chanticleer Garden =

Public garden and historic house in Wayne, Pennsylvania, United States

- Chanticleer
- U.S. National Register of Historic Places
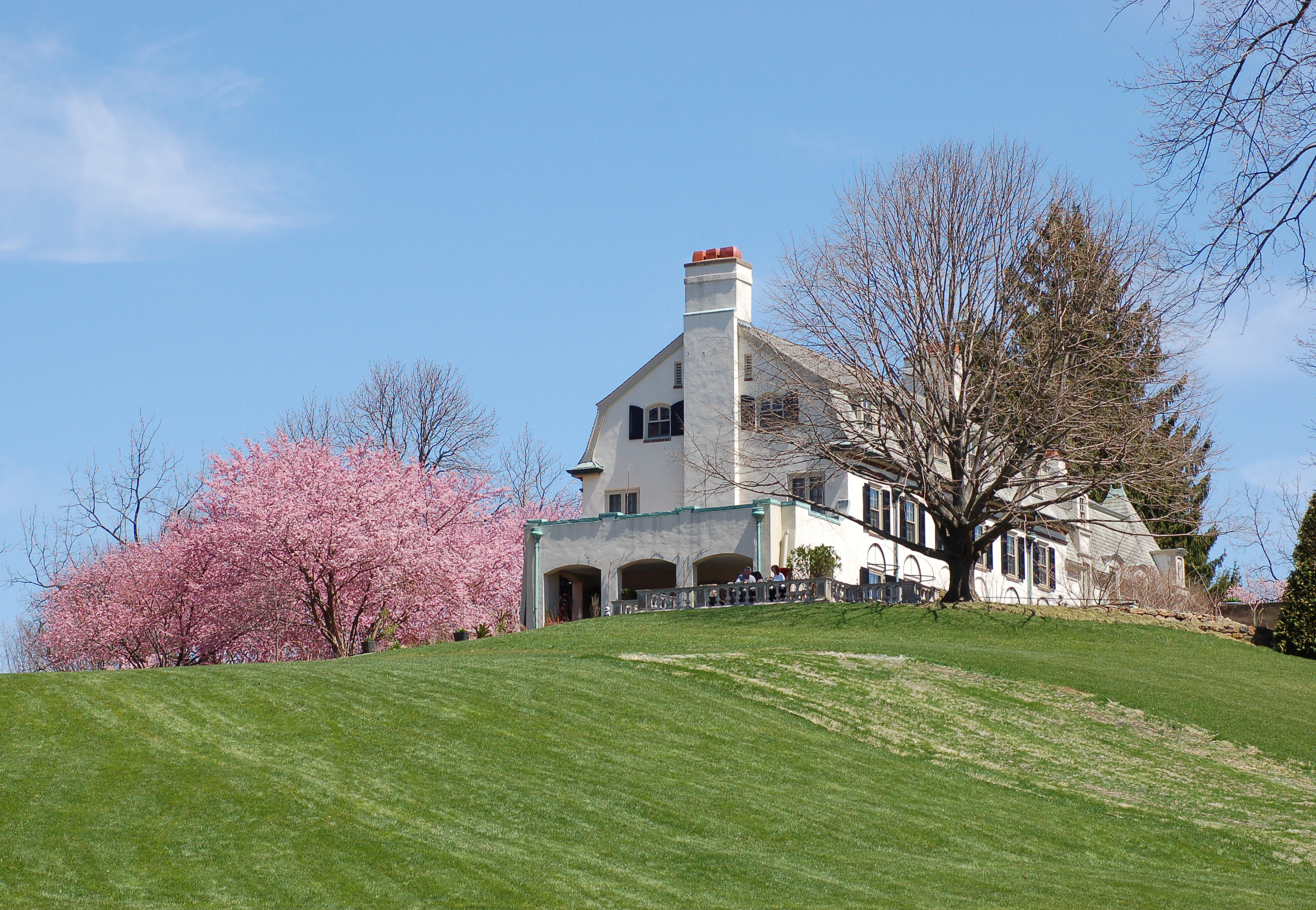
- Chanticleer, the main house, in spring.
- Location: 786 Church Road in Wayne, Pennsylvania
- Coordinates: 40°1′49.8″N 75°23′11.6″W
- Area: 48 acres (19 ha)
- Built: 1912
- Architect: Zantzinger, Borie and Medary
- Architectural style: Colonial Revival, Colonial, Pastoral
- Website: www.chanticleergarden.org
- NRHP reference No.: 84003350
- Added to NRHP: July 24, 1984

Chanticleer Garden is a 48 acres (19 ha) botanical garden built on the grounds of the Rosengarten estate at 786 Church Road in Wayne, Pennsylvania. Located on Philadelphia's historic Main Line, Chanticleer retains a domestic scale and welcomes visitors for relaxation, walking, and picnics. The grounds became open to the public in 1993. Visitors are welcome to tour the estate seasonally, from April through October. The house and grounds were added to the National Register of Historic Places in 1984.

== History ==
The estate was built in 1912 as a summer cottage for Christine Penrose and Adolph G. Rosengarten Sr., the latter of whom was the head of Rosengarten & Sons, a Philadelphia pharmaceutical manufacturer that his family had founded in 1822 to produce quinine. The company merged with Merck & Co in 1927.

Upon inheriting the estate in 1946, their son, Adolph G. Rosengarten Jr. established a foundation to ensure that Chanticleer would be developed as a public garden.

"Chanticleer" means rooster in French. The entrance gate is crested with a carved-stone rooster; other references to roosters can be found throughout the estate. Rosengarten Jr. hired Christopher Woods, a native of Britain, to develop the garden. After Rosengarten Jr.'s death in 1990, Woods became the founding Executive Director and began a radical revision of the garden. He tore down Mr. Rosengarten's stone house to create what is now known as "The Ruin".

Today, Chanticleer consists of a collection of open lawns and large trees. Different sections of the botanical gardens include:

- Chanticleer House, the Main House, connecting to the entrance and Teacup Garden, which includes an open-air porch, providing a popular spot for visitors to sit and relax
- Asian Woods, planting for which began in 1995, after being cleared the previous year, and now hosting a variety of species native to Korea, Japan, and China, but in the style of an American woodland garden
- Pond Garden, a large man-made circular pond constructed in the early 1970s, acting as a mirror for the trees that surround it

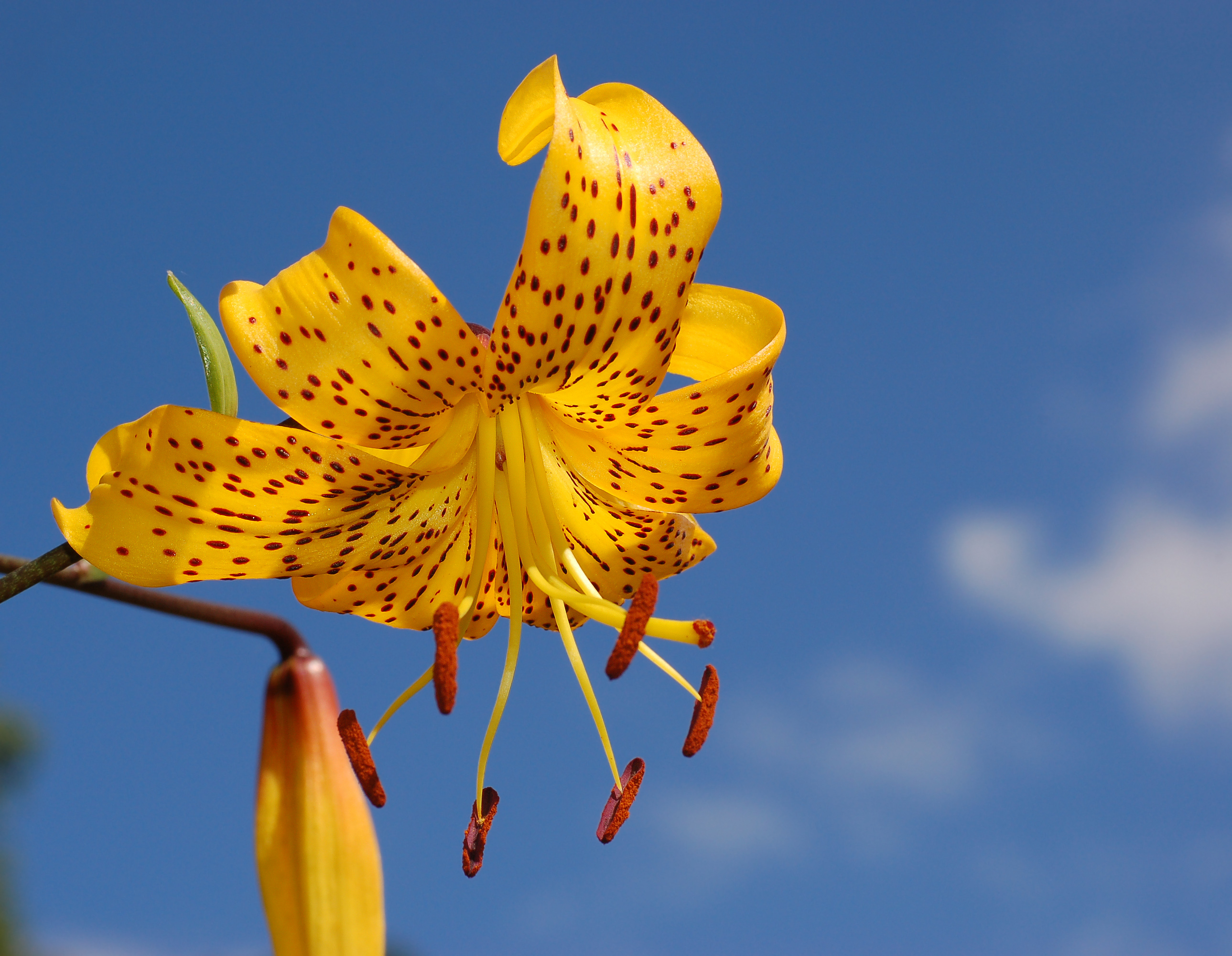
Lilium 'Citronella' flower, just one of the many species in the gardens.

- Teacup Garden, a small garden serving as the entrance courtyard to the property
- Minder Woods, a heavily vegetated area with towering red oaks and dark green pines, firs, false cypresses, and hemlocks, accessible via meandering stone paths
- Tennis Court Garden, the estate's old tennis court, transformed into a garden
- "The Ruin" Garden, the Minder House, built in 1925 and razed in 1999 to offer a series of spaces, pools, and fountains
- Gravel Garden, small garden spaces, connected by a series of steps, and home to a variety of species of plants that are rare to the area and climate
- Cutting Garden, a traditional cottage garden with a series of arches, fashioned from rebar and driftwood, for clematis and annual vines
- Vegetable garden, where rustic benches help frame a simple traditional American vegetable garden
- Bell's Run, with adjacent woods giving way to undulating lawns, a stream, and a functional 1940s waterwheel
- Bell's Woodland, a naturalistic garden devoted to plants indigenous to the eastern U.S.
- Bulb Meadow, on a hillside, highlighted by Spanish bluebells and fragile daffodils

== Gallery ==
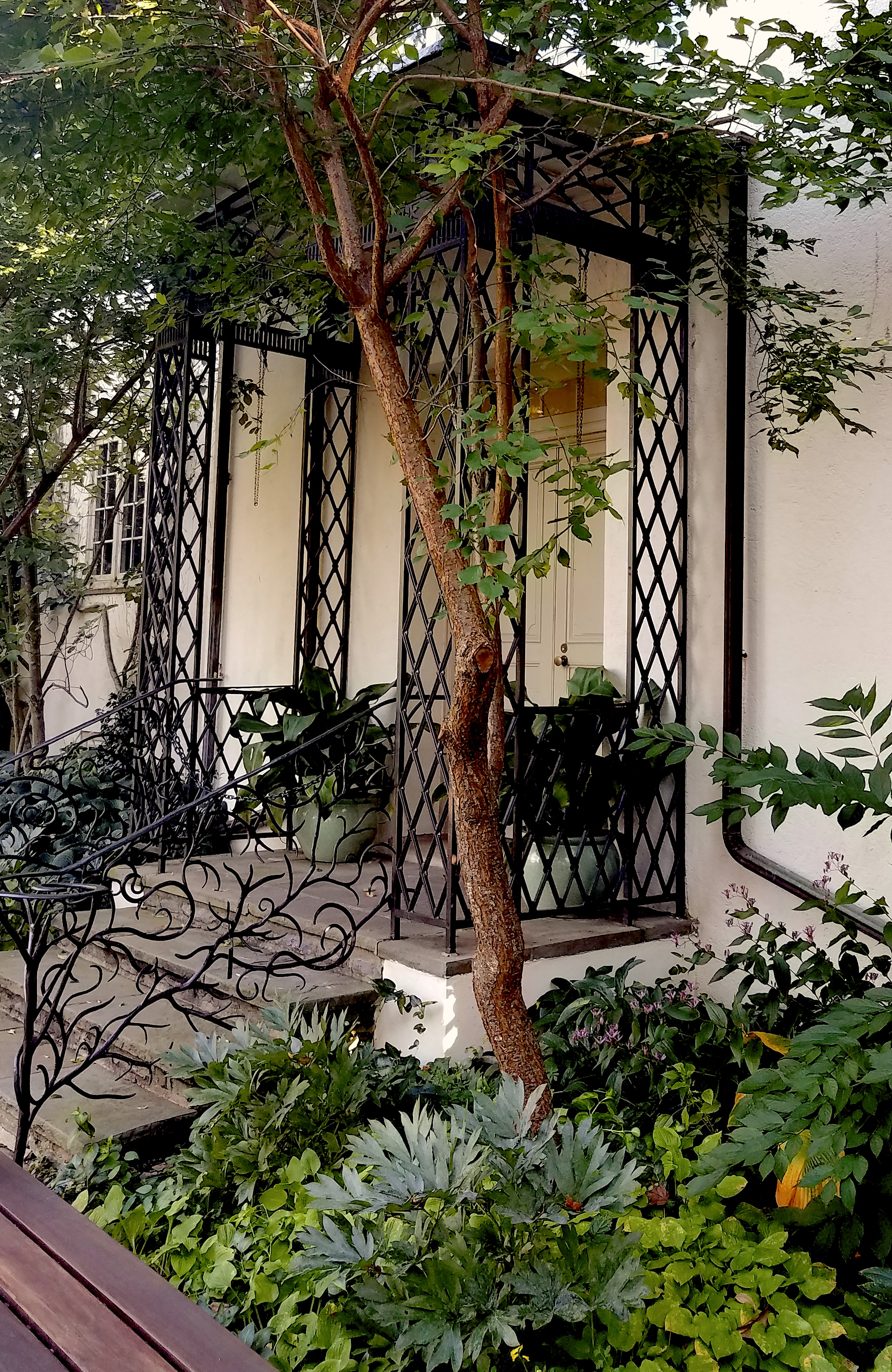
Door of the estate house.

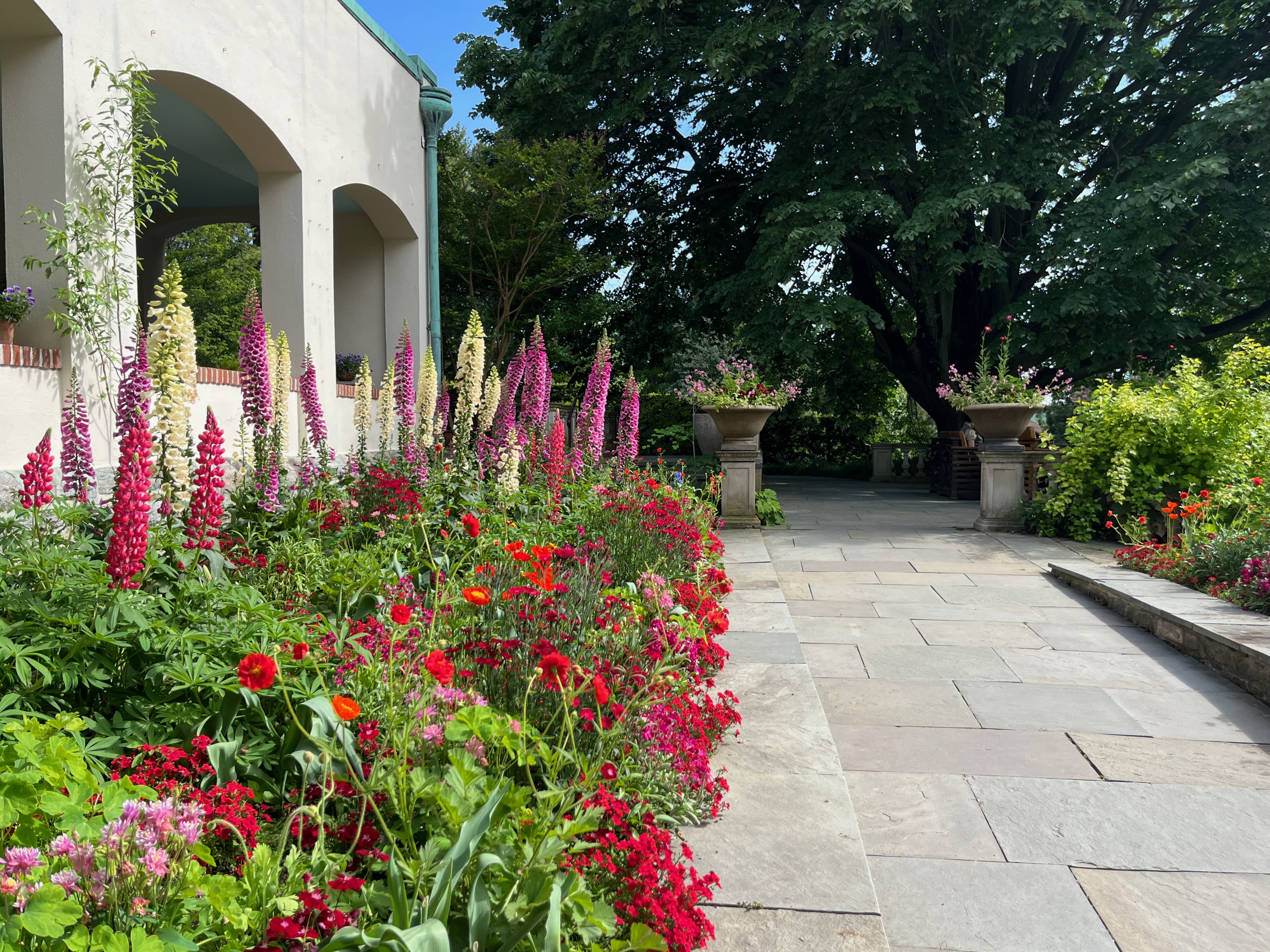
Overlook at the Chanticleer House

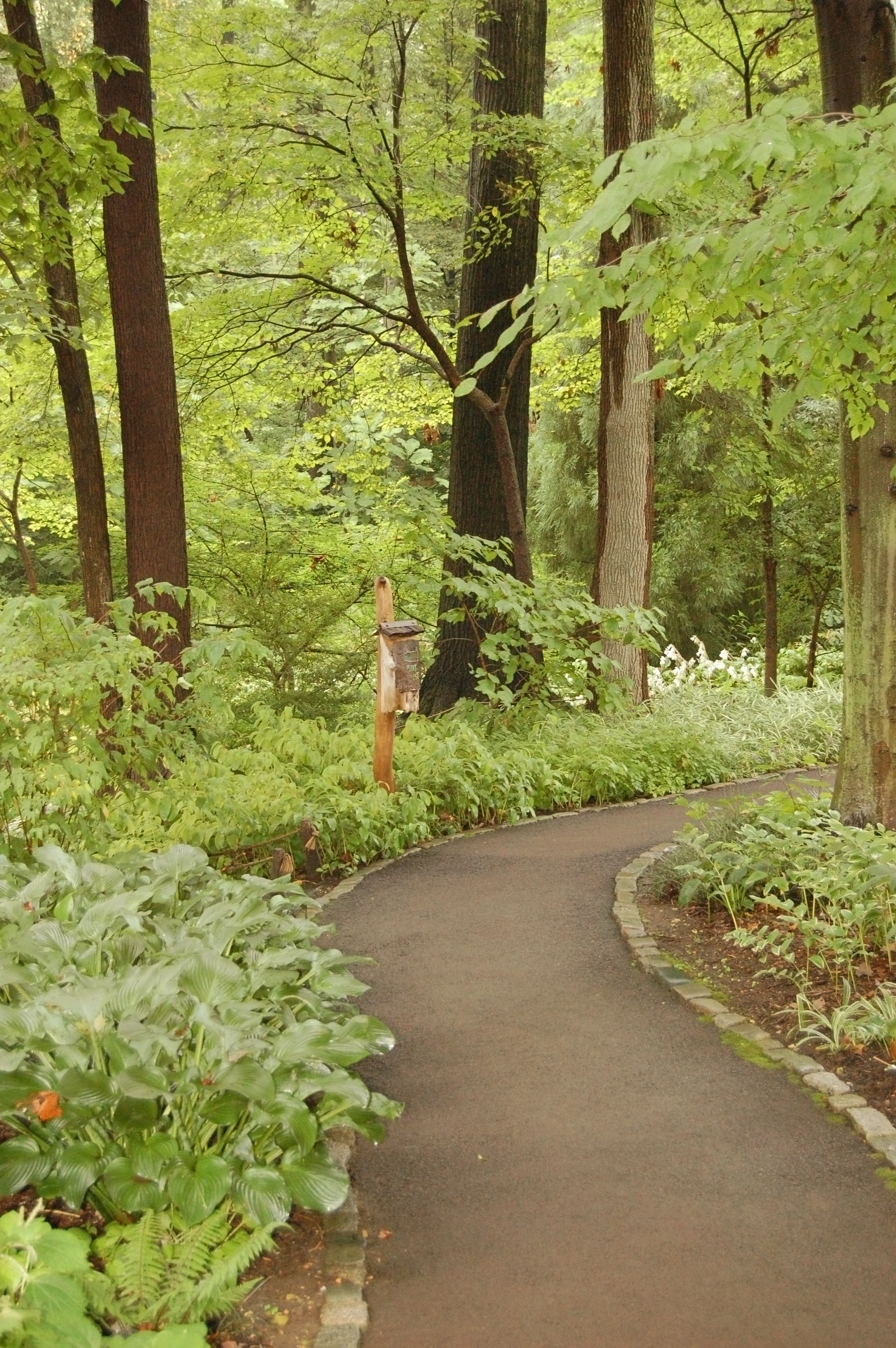
Asian Woods

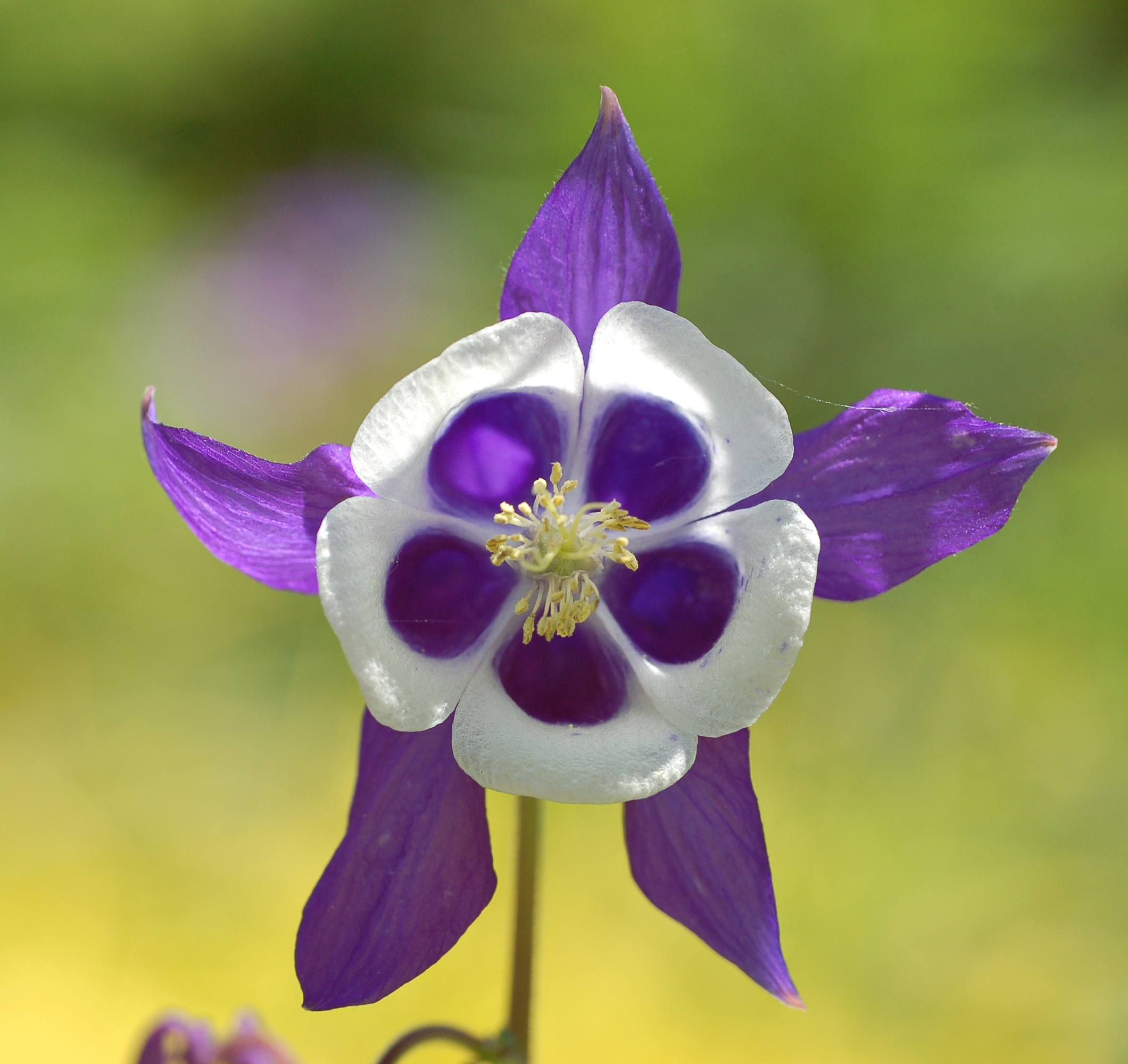
Aquilegia 'Blue Butterflies' flower

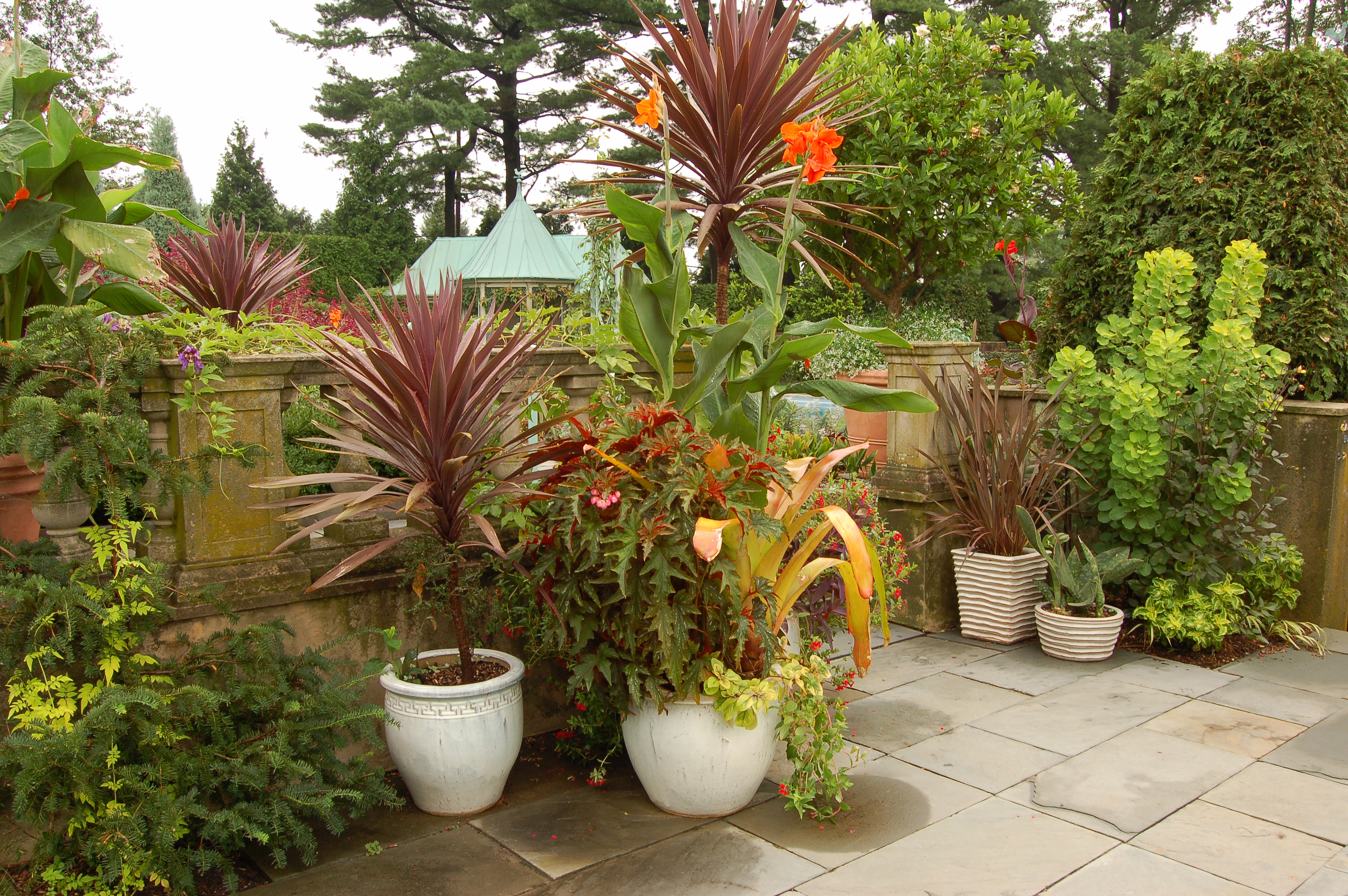
Plants on the Croquet Lawn in front of the main house

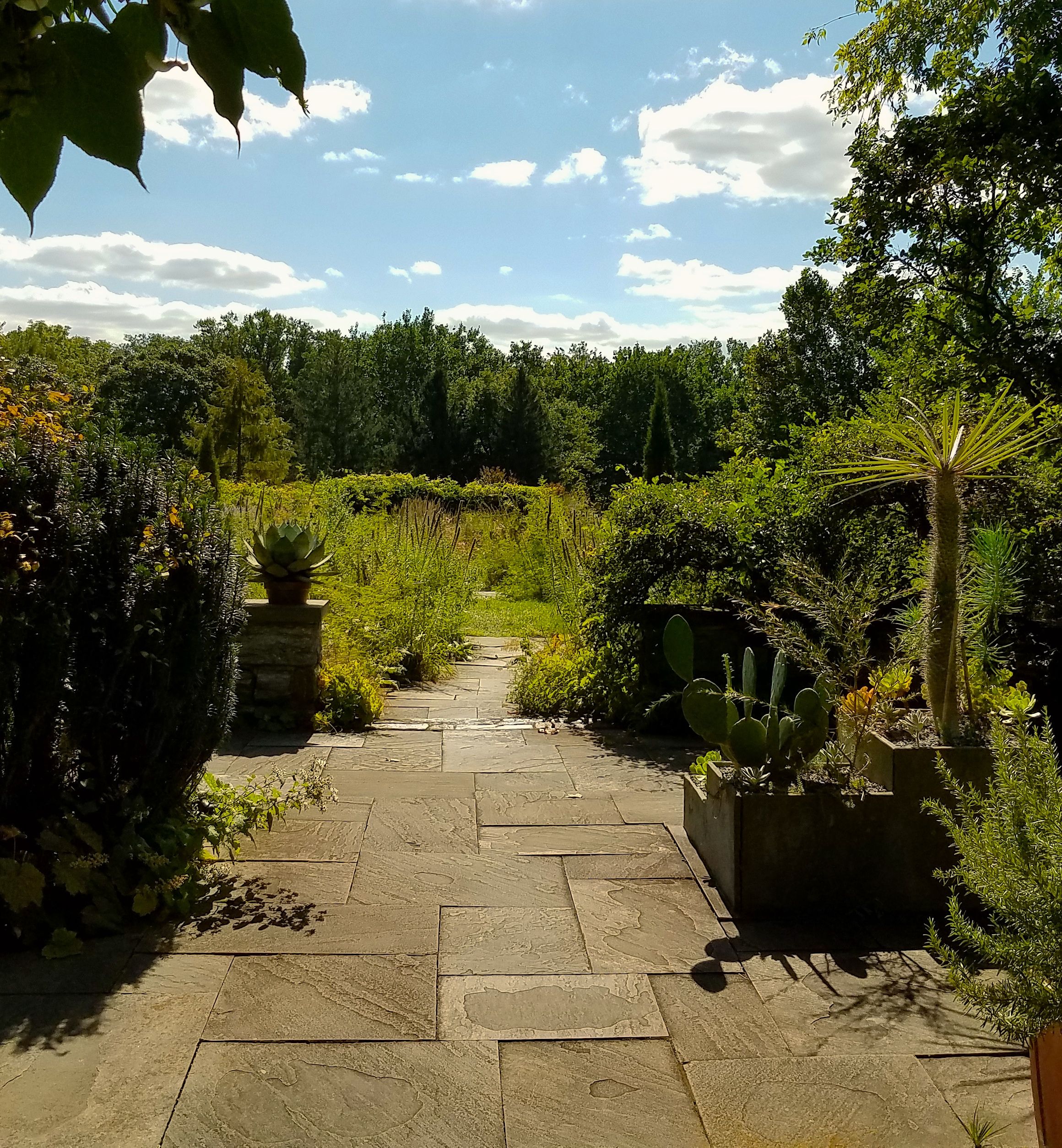
Garden Path

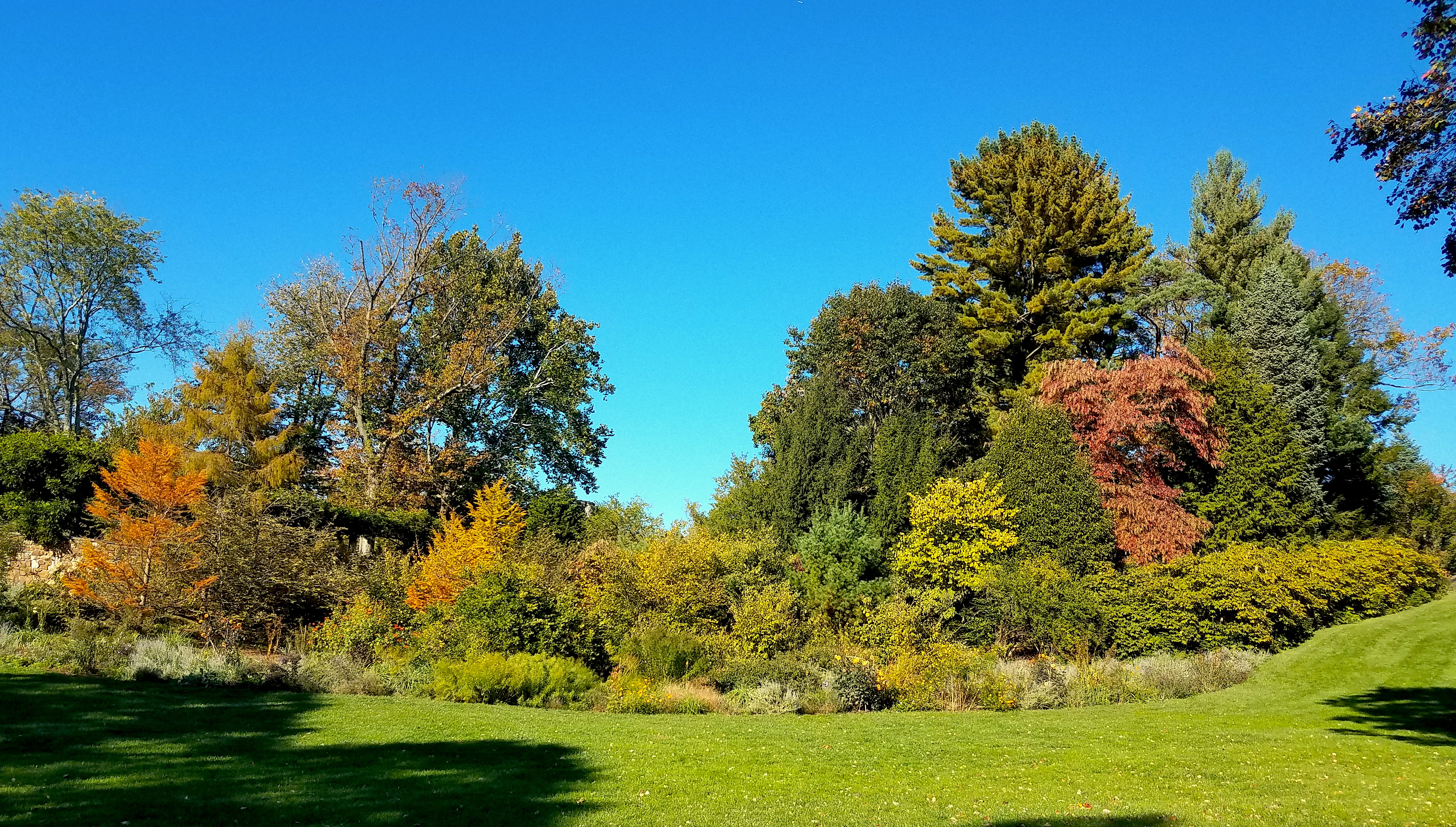
Landscape

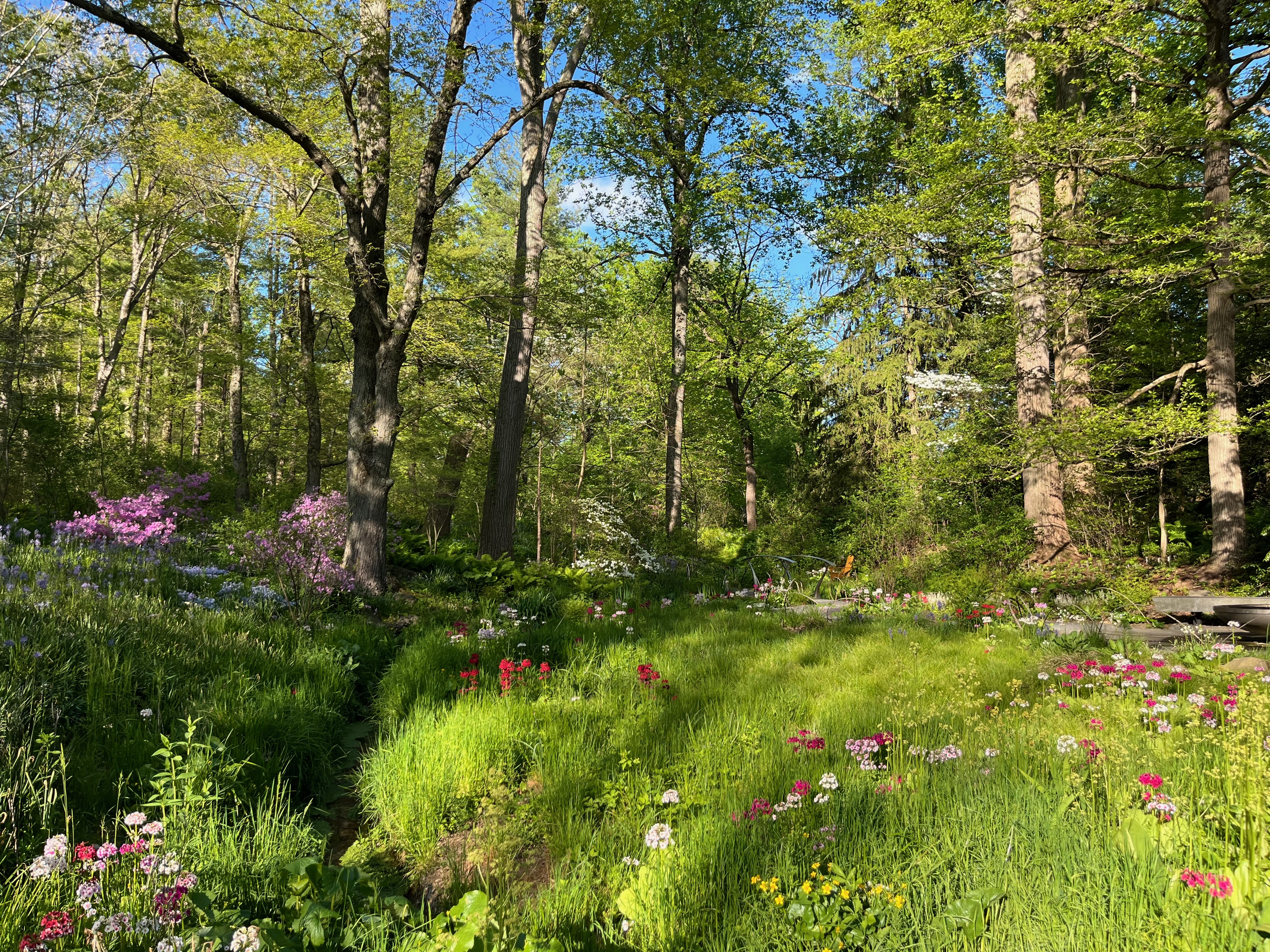
Bell's Run

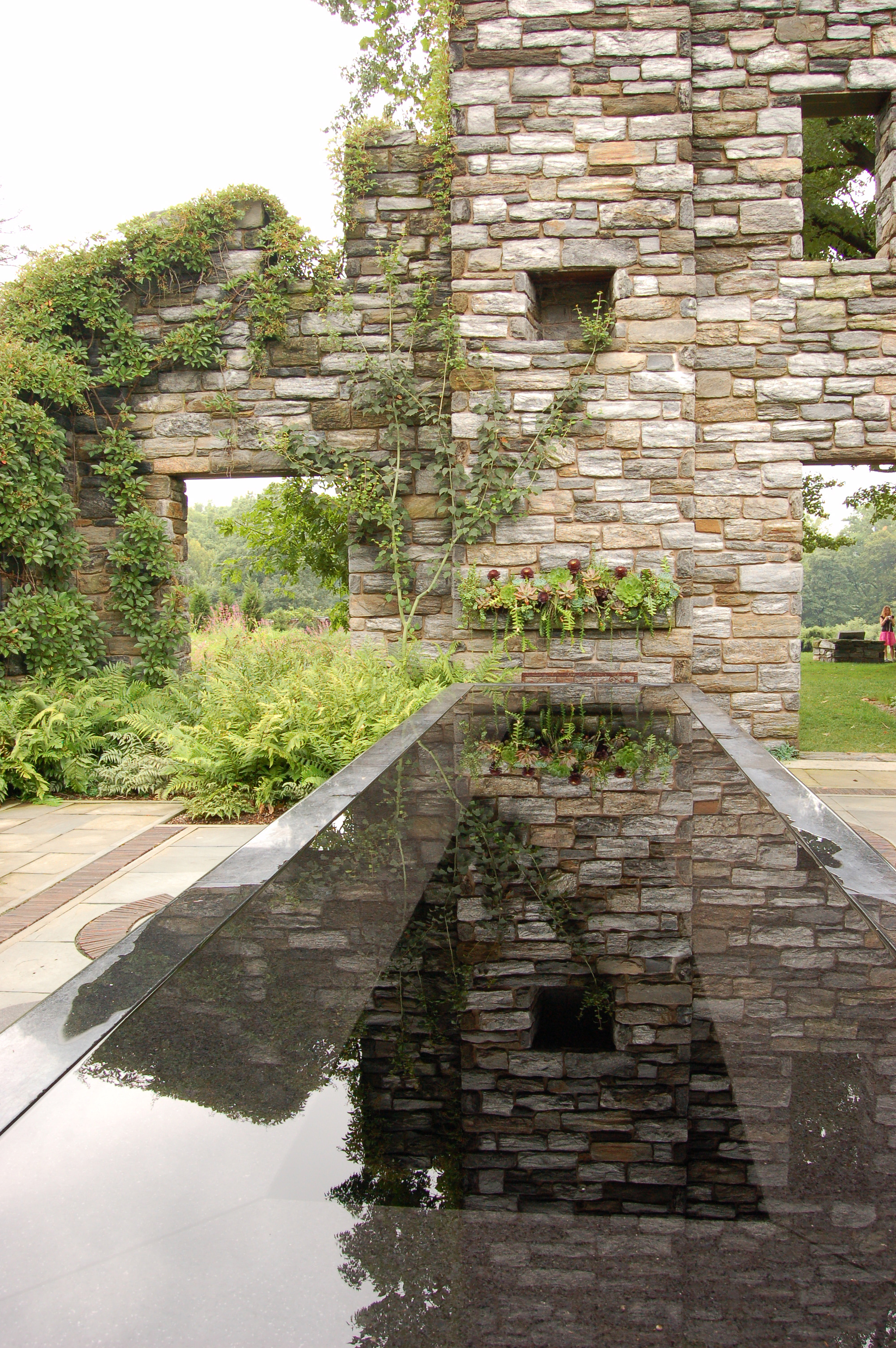
Gravel Garden with reflecting pool near ruin.

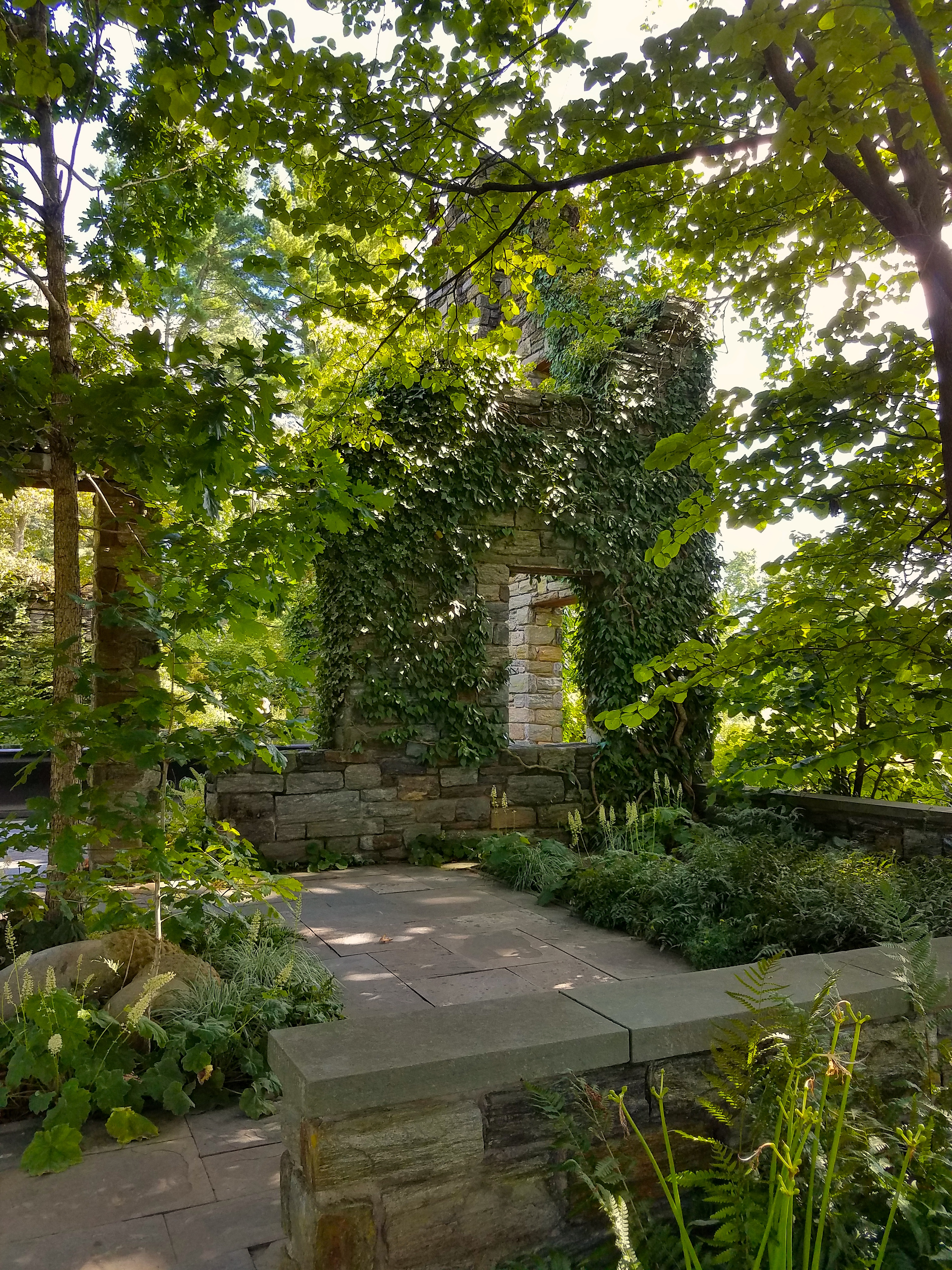
Portion of ruin and garden.

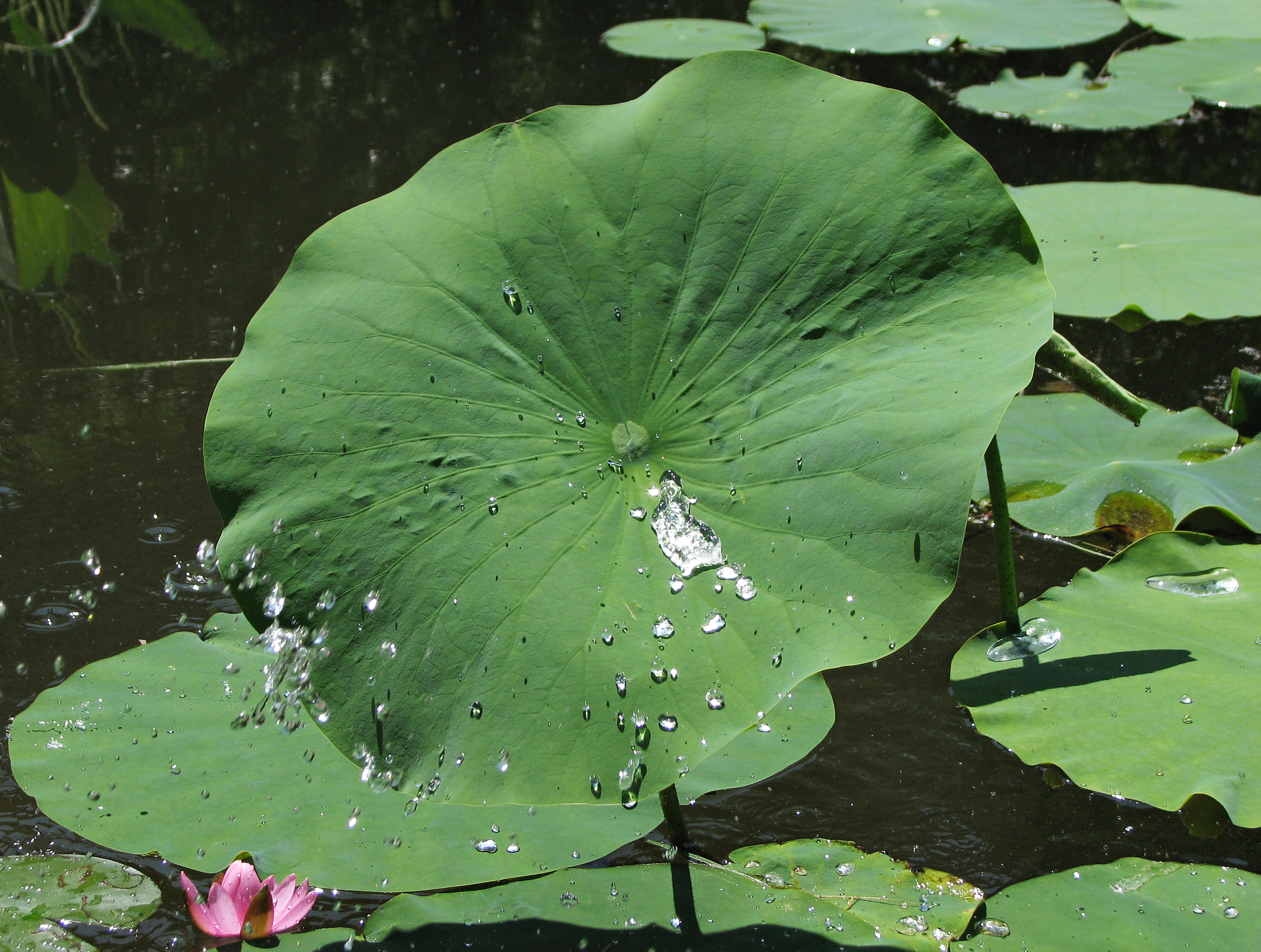
Nelumbo nucifera in a pond.

== See also ==
- List of botanical gardens in the United States
