= Tomás Roseingrave =

Irish social scientist (1918–1993)

Tomás Roseingrave (4 July 1918 – 21 August 1993) was an Irish social scientist.

== Biography ==
Roseingrave was born at Gort, County Galway, to Thomas Roseingrave (an engineer) and Nora McMahon, in 1918. He was educated at the O'Brien Institute, Dublin, between 1928 and 1934, later working for the Dublin Port and Milling Company, and later still for Ceimici Teoranta, in 1965.

He earned a Master's Degree in social science at University College Dublin, in the early 1960s, where he would later become a senior research fellow. In 1967 he became director of manpower studies in the Department of Labour. It was in this capacity that he published a number of influential reports on Irish regional development, such as Manpower in an industrial growth centre: a survey in Waterford.

A member of Muintir na Tíre, he was in 1968 made its second national director. His reports while at Munintir na Tire were well received at government level and played a significant part in the examination of the problems current in rural Ireland in the 1970s.

Ireland joined the EEC in 1973, and from then till his death, Roseingrave was a member of the EEC's Economic and Social Committee, acting as a rapporteur for many of its opinions, particularly in new areas pertaining to community and technology. His work was recognised by an award of the gold medal of the Foundation for European Merit in 1982. Five years later, he was distinguished when made a Grand Officer of the Institute for Diplomatic Relations. Through Home Truth, an RTÉ programme that ran from 1966 to 1968, and his weekly broadcasting work on RTÉ radio, he became associated in the public mind as the public face of Irish social sciences.

A keen Irish language enthusiast and a member of the Gaelic League, Roseingrave was a member of the Gaelic Athletic Association, the RTÉ review committee and a member of the Dublin Institute of Adult Education.

== Personal life ==
On 21 August 1945, Roseingrave married Ellen Goulding, with whom he had two sons and four daughters. They lived in Dundrum, Dublin. A son, Tom, died suddenly in November 2006. A daughter, Siobhan Roseingrave, stood during the 2011 Irish general election as the lone Independent female candidate in the constituency of Wexford.

Roseingrave died in St. Vincent's Hospital, Dublin, in August 1993, after living much of his life in the city.

== Bibliography ==
- Manpower in an industrial growth centre:a survey in Waterford, The Stationery Office, Dublin, 1969.
- Community development and the goals of development in Ireland, 1974.
- Some aspects of community development as a method of social work, 1975.
- Social research as a basis for social planning, 1975.
