= Albrecht Rosengarten =

Albrecht Rosengarten (also Albert Rosengarten, 5 January 1809 – 15 August 1893) was among the first Jewish Germans permitted to train and practice as an architect and the first to design synagogues. His work was a major influence on the Rundbogenstil design of synagogues in Central Europe and abroad in the second half of the nineteenth century.

== Training and career ==
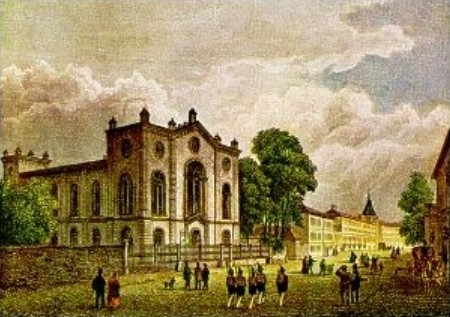
The synagogue in Kassel (1839)

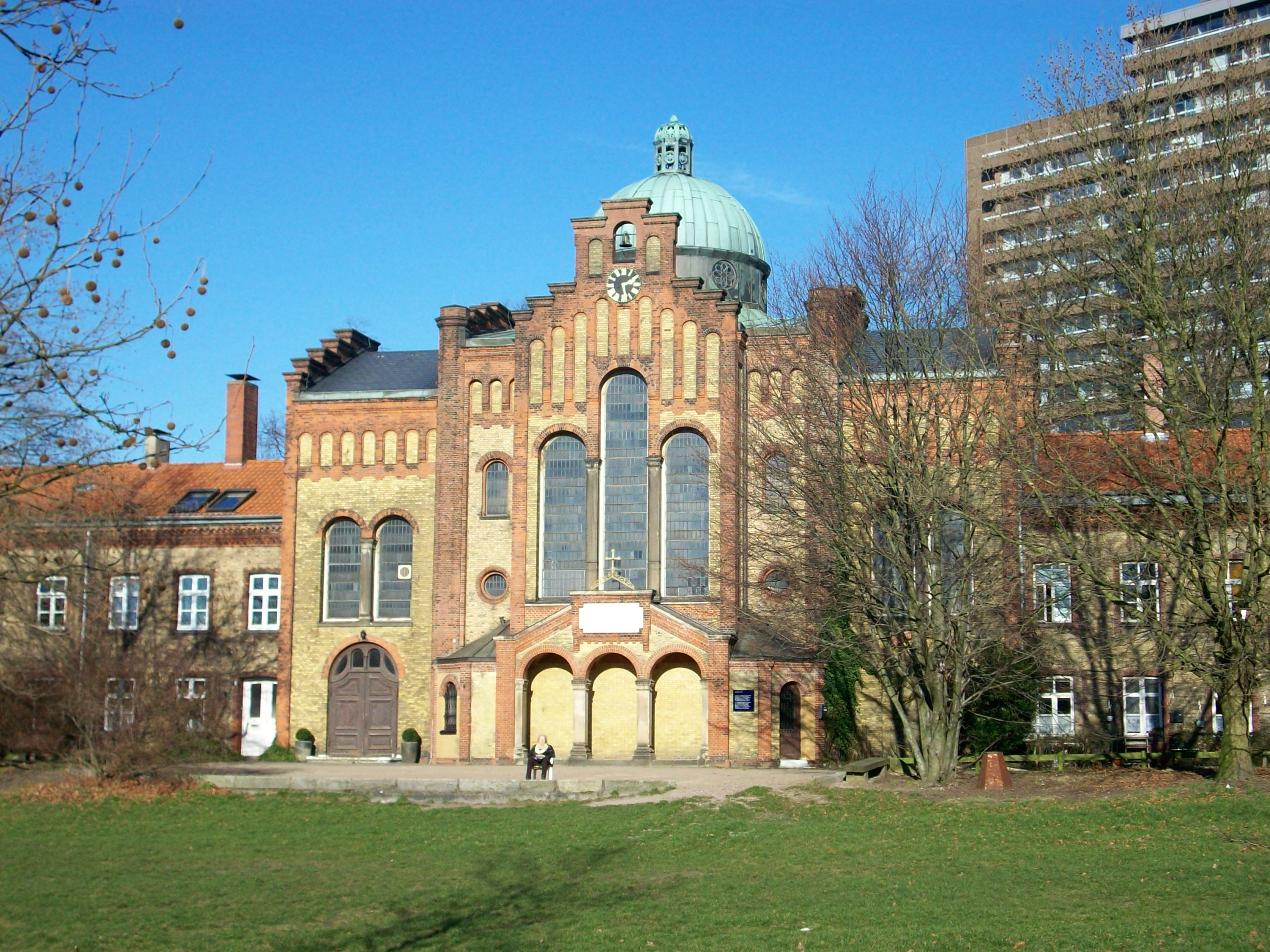
Schröder home in Hamburg (1853), now a Coptic church

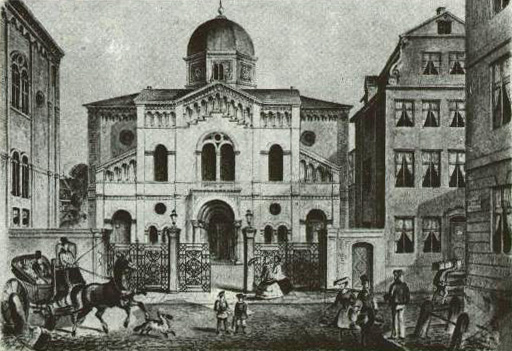
The Kohlhöfen Synagogue in Hamburg (1859)

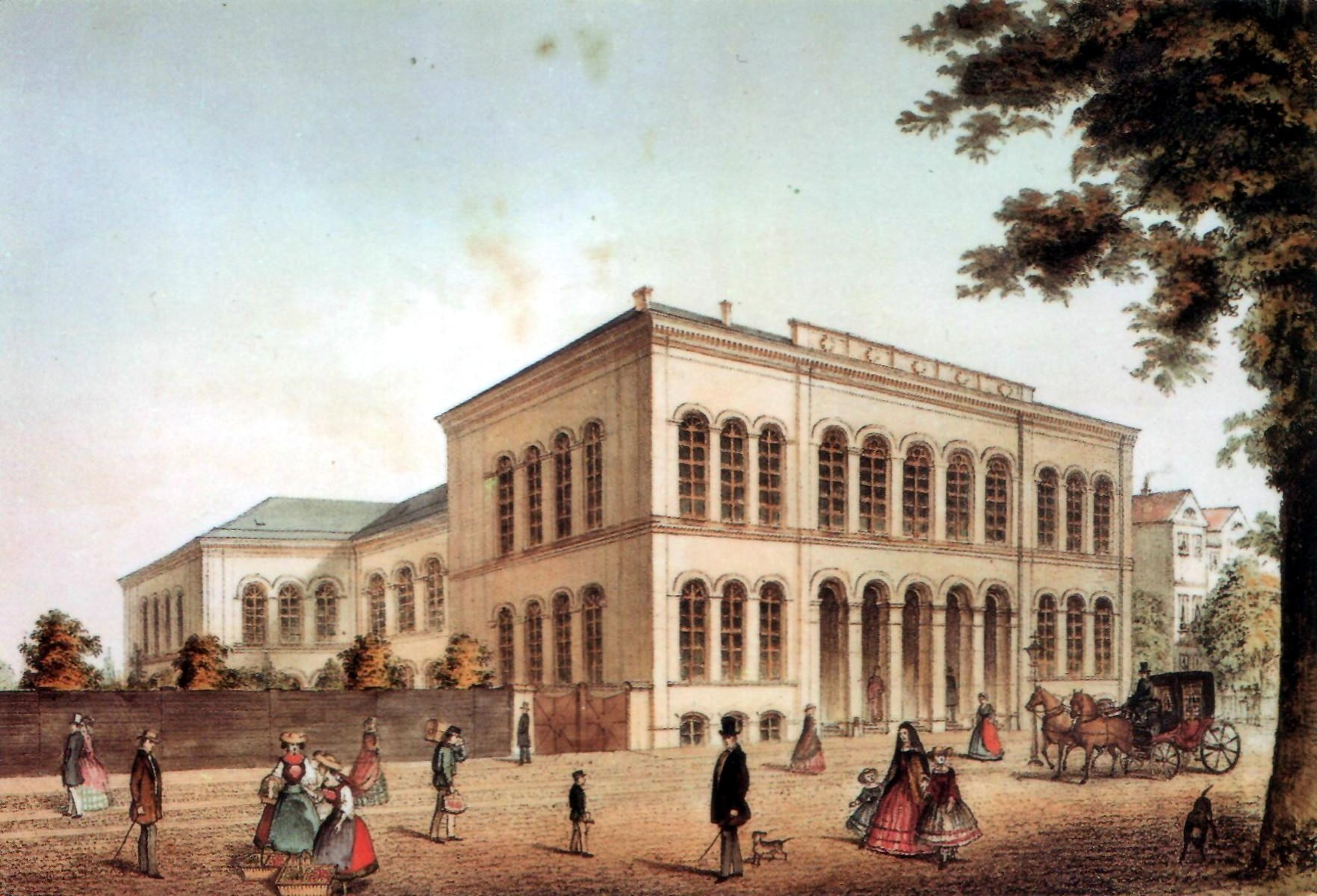
Guesthouse and Hospital in Hamburg (1858)

He was born to Julie (née Gans) and Abraham Rosengarten, a carpet manufacturer in Kassel. As a boy he displayed an aptitude for drawing, and he received his first training at a private drawing school. He enrolled from 1826 to 1829 at the Kassel Art Academy under the direction of Johann Heinrich Wolff, an advocate of Néo-Grec architecture who was firmly opposed to the new Rundbogenstil (rounded-arch style) championed at this time by Heinrich Hübsch, director of the building authority of Karlsruhe in the Grand Duchy of Baden. Rosengarten was accepted as an apprentice at the Kassel building authority in 1827–29, beginning his employment in the civil service of the Electorate of Hesse. He was awarded a prize at the Kassel Art Academy and in 1829–30 made his first study trip to Rome. Upon his return to Hesse, he was again employed at the Kassel building authority, now as an assistant to the director. In all, Rosengarten worked for twelve years in the civil service of the Electorate of Hesse, broadening his expertise through study trips to Paris (with Henri Labrouste) in 1839 and, for a second time, to Rome in 1841. Rosengarten, who never married, moved in 1842 to Hamburg, where he designed a number of buildings. He died in Wiesbaden.

== The Kassel synagogue ==
Between 1830 and 1834, Kassel's Jewish community considered and rejected numerous designs for a new synagogue submitted by the foremost architects of Hesse, all of them Rosengarten's civil service superiors. His proposal for a building in the Rundbogenstil was finally accepted. Rosengarten had come to regard the basilica of classical antiquity as the prototype and thus the common root for Jews and Christians, and he considered the allied Rundbogenstil most suitable for synagogues. In doing so, he rejected both the neo-Gothic style because of its all too obvious connection with Christianity and the neo-Egyptian style because of its association with slavery. He likewise spurned neo-Classical copying of Greco-Roman temples.

The synagogue stood in Untere Königstrasse and was consecrated on 8 August 1839 after three years of construction. A large building with two-stories and three aisles, it provided space for around 800 members of the congregation. In accordance with the wishes of Kassel's Jewish community, it conveyed a sense of self-confidence and pride without standing out too much from its surroundings. With its unadorned façade, neo-Romanesque round arches, and yellowish-white quarry stone, it blended harmoniously into the cityscape.

== Influence ==
With this building, Rosengarten created a new style in synagogue construction, characterized by the desire to signify Jewish integration in architectural terms. He published his views and plans in the Wiener Allgemeine Bauzeitung in 1840, and many contemporary architects took note. Beyond his work on the Kassel synagogue, he achieved renown as the designer of the synagogue in Gudensberg in northern Hesse (1840–1843) as well as three synagogues built in brick shell construction (including the Kohlhöfen Synagogue in Hamburg). Since most of the synagogues Rosengarten designed were destroyed in the Kristallnacht of 1938, the synagogue in Gudensberg in northern Hesse is probably one of the few synagogues by him, if not the only one, that has survived.

Rosengarten's work in Kassel influenced the design of new synagogues built in Frankfurt am Main (Schützenstrasse, 1853) and Mannheim (1855). His influence was also evident in the Austro-Hungarian Empire. The synagogues in Pohořelice (1855), Brno (1855) and Jihlava (1863) in Moravia adopted the Rundbogenstil, as did the New Synagogue in Gliwice (1861), the Great Synagogue in Plzeň (1861), and the Linz Synagogue (1877).

== Buildings ==
- 1836–1838: Kassel synagogue
- 1840–1843: Gudensberg synagogue, since 2015 a cultural center
- after 1842: Wilkens house, Hamburg, Alter Wall 56–58
- after 1842: Residence, Hamburg, Alsterdamm 3
- after 1842: Schumacher & Dahnert building, Hamburg, Johannisstrasse 19
- 1851–1853: Schröder house, Hamburg
- 1858: Guesthouse and Hospital, Hamburg, Danziger Strasse
- 1857–1859: Kohlhöfer synagogue, Hamburg
- 1862: Schröder mausoleum, Hamburg, Petrikirchhof
- 1867–1869: Old age home, Hamburg, Mühlendamm
- 1872: Horschitz villa, Hamburg, Harvestehuder Weg 8
- 1874: Alida Schmidt house, Hamburg, Bürgerweide 23

== Books ==
- with Gotthilf Ludwig Runge: Architektonische Mittheilungen über Italien. Eine Auswahl interessantester und werthvoller Darstellungen aus den Mappen der Architekten L. Runge und A. Rosengarten. 2 vols. Berlin: Müller, [1847].
- Die architektonischen Stylarten. Eine kurze, allgemeinfaßliche Darstellung der charakteristischen Verschiedenheiten der architektonischen Stylarten. Braunschweig: Vieweg, 1857.
  - A Handbook of Architectural Styles. Trans. William Collett-Sandars. London: Chatto & Windus, 1877; New York: Charles Scribner's Sons.
- Architekturbilder aus Paris und London. Hamburg: Perthes-Besser & Mauke, 1860.
