= Rhonda Rosengren =

New Zealand toxicology researcher

Rhonda J Rosengren
- Education: Texas A&M University
- Scientific career
- Fields: Toxicology
- Workplaces: University of Otago

Rhonda J Rosengren is a New Zealand toxicology academic, and as of 2019 is a full professor at the University of Otago.

== Academic career ==
After at Texas A&M University, Rosengren moved to the University of Otago, rising to full professor.

Most of Rosengren's research involves the toxicology of oncology drugs.

== Selected works ==
- Stuart, Emma C., Marissa J. Scandlyn, and Rhonda J. Rosengren. "Role of epigallocatechin gallate (EGCG) in the treatment of breast and prostate cancer." Life sciences 79, no. 25 (2006): 2329–2336. According to Google Scholar, this reference has been cited 167 times by July 2019.
- Scandlyn, Marissa J., Emma C. Stuart, and Rhonda J. Rosengren. "Sex-specific differences in CYP450 isoforms in humans." Expert opinion on drug Metabolism & toxicology 4, no. 4 (2008): 413–424. According to Google Scholar, this reference has been cited 127 times by July 2019.
- Alexander, Amy, Paul F. Smith, and Rhonda J. Rosengren. "Cannabinoids in the treatment of cancer." Cancer letters 285, no. 1 (2009): 6–12. According to Google Scholar, this reference has been cited 125 times by July 2019.
- Somers‐Edgar, Tiffany J., Marissa J. Scandlyn, Emma C. Stuart, Martin J. Le Nedelec, Sophie P. Valentine, and Rhonda J. Rosengren. "The combination of epigallocatechin gallate and curcumin suppresses ERα‐breast cancer cell growth in vitro and in vivo." International journal of cancer 122, no. 9 (2008): 1966–1971.
