= Adolph G. Rosengarten =

American chemist (1870–1946)

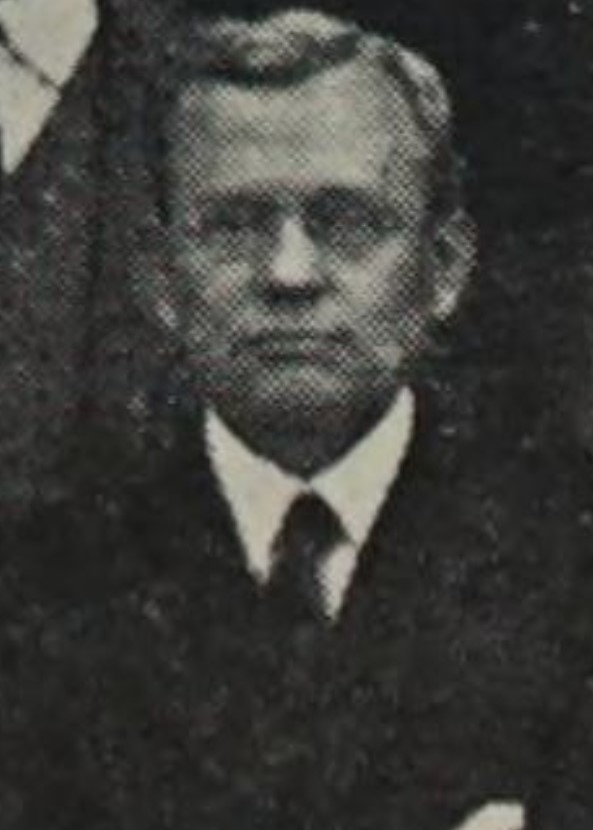
- Rosengarten, c. 1918
- Born: February 22, 1870; Philadelphia, Pennsylvania, U.S.
- Died: April 22, 1946 (aged 76); Bryn Mawr, Pennsylvania, U.S.
- Education: University of Pennsylvania (BS)
- Occupation: Chemist
- Spouse: Christine Penrose (m. 1901)
- Children: 2
- Relatives: Joseph George Rosengarten (uncle)

Adolph G. Rosengarten (February 22, 1870 – April 22, 1946) was an American chemist from Philadelphia. He served with the U.S. Volunteers in the Spanish–American War and was chief of the miscellaneous section of the chemical division of the War Industries Board during World War I.

== Early life ==
Adolph G. Rosengarten was born on February 22, 1870, in Philadelphia, Pennsylvania, to Clara Johanna (née Knorr) and Harry Bennet Rosengarten. His father was a partner of the family's Rosengarten & Sons chemical manufacturing business. He was named after his uncle Adolph G. Rosengarten, a Union soldier who died at the Second Battle of Murfreesboro. His uncle was Joseph George Rosengarten. Rosengarten graduated from Faires Classical Institute in 1881 and other preparatory schools. He took a chemistry course in Towne Scientific School and later graduated with a Bachelor of Science from the University of Pennsylvania in 1892.

== Career ==
In October 1892, Rosengarten joined the family firm Rosengarten & Sons. He became a partner in 1898. He was a member of the first troop of the Philadelphia City Cavalry from 1893 to 1903. He joined with the United States Volunteers in the Spanish–American War, serving from April to November 1898, including the Puerto Rico campaign. The business was incorporated in 1901 and he was elected secretary and treasurer. He remained in the role until January 1, 1905, when the firm absorbed Powers & Weightman and became Powers-Weightman-Rosengarten Company. He was then elected treasurer and later elected as vice president in 1917.

During World War I, Rosengarten was in charge of medicinal chemicals in the medical section of the War Industries Board. In 1918, he was chief of the miscellaneous section of the chemical division of the board.

Following the war, Rosengarten was elected vice president of Powers-Weightman-Rosengarten Company. The company was located in East Falls and Parrish Street in Philadelphia. The firm merged with Merck & Co. in 1927 and he became a director of Merck. He was a director of Philadelphia National Bank, Philadelphia Salt Manufacturing Company, Fidelity-Philadelphia Trust Company and Philadelphia Zoological Society. He was a trustee of the University of Pennsylvania, Penn Mutual and Lankenau Hospital. He was a member of the Philosophical Society, the American Institute of Chemical Engineers, the Philadelphia Club and the Rittenhouse Club.

== Personal life ==
Rosengarten married Christine Penrose, daughter of Walter Elliott Penrose and cousin of Boies Penrose, on April 30, 1901. They had a son and daughter, Adolph G. Jr. and Emily. He lived on Church Street in St. Davids, Pennsylvania.

Rosengarten died on April 22, 1946, aged 76, at Bryn Mawr Hospital in Bryn Mawr.
