= North Wayne Historic District =

Historic district in Pennsylvania, United States

- U.S. National Register of Historic Places
- U.S. Historic district
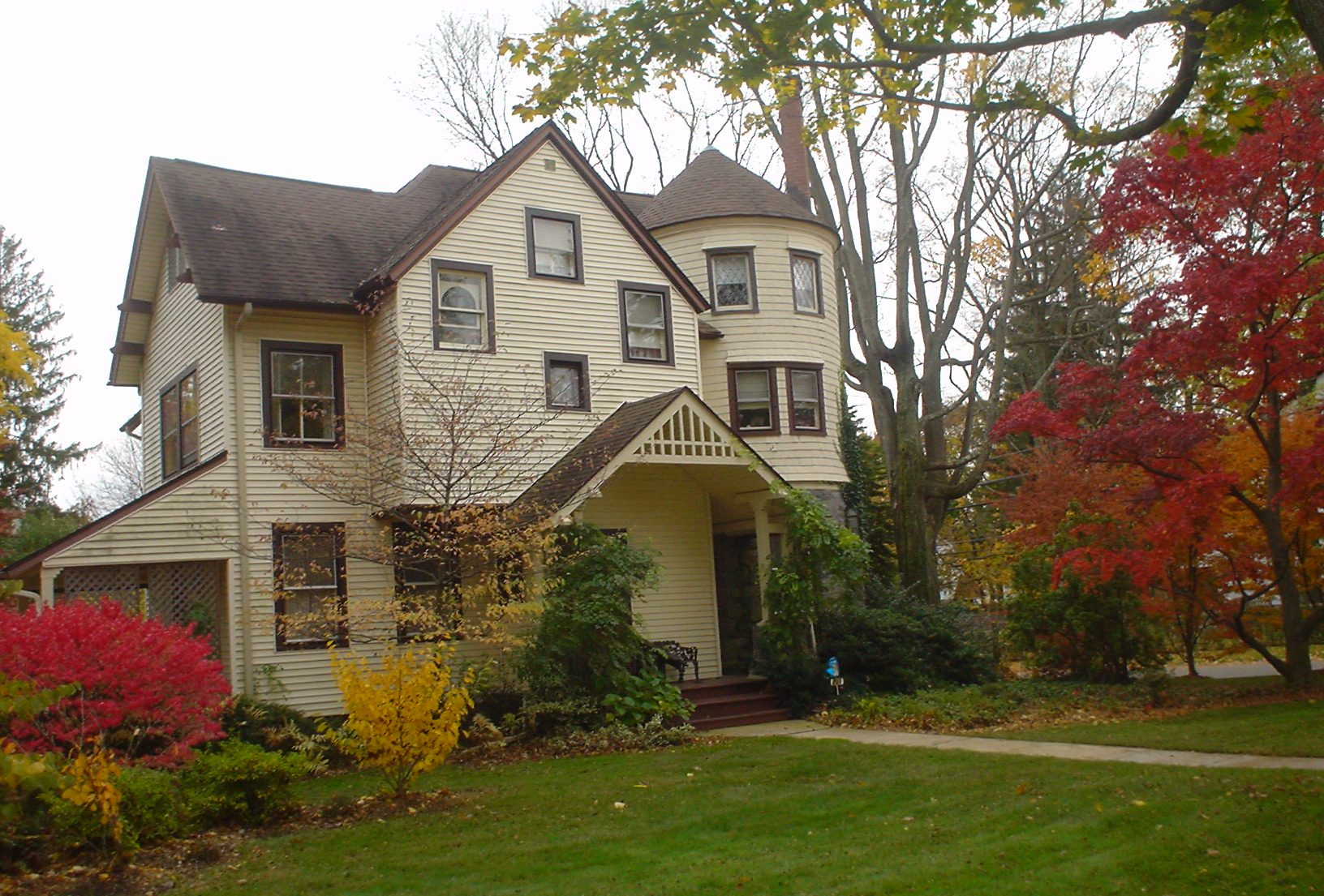
- House in the North Wayne Historic District, October 2009

- Location within Pennsylvania Location within the United States
- Location: Roughly bounded by Eagle Rd., Woodland Ct., Radnor St., Poplar & N. Wayne Ave., Wayne, Pennsylvania
- Coordinates: 40°02′59″N 75°23′12″W
- Area: 97 acres (39 ha)
- Architect: Wendell & Smith; Multiple
- Architectural style: Late 19th And 20th Century Revivals, Late Victorian
- NRHP reference No.: 85001619
- Added to NRHP: July 25, 1985

The North Wayne Historic District is a national historic district that is located in Wayne, Delaware County, Pennsylvania.

It was added to the National Register of Historic Places in 1985.

== History and architectural features ==
This district is located north of the South Wayne Historic District, and includes 190 contributing buildings that are located in a residential area of Wayne. The contributing dwellings were built between 1881 and 1925, and include notable examples of Shingle Style and Colonial Revival architecture.

This district also reflects suburban development in the late-nineteenth century, as it was a major component of a large, planned, railroad commuter suburb called "Wayne Estate."

== Houses ==
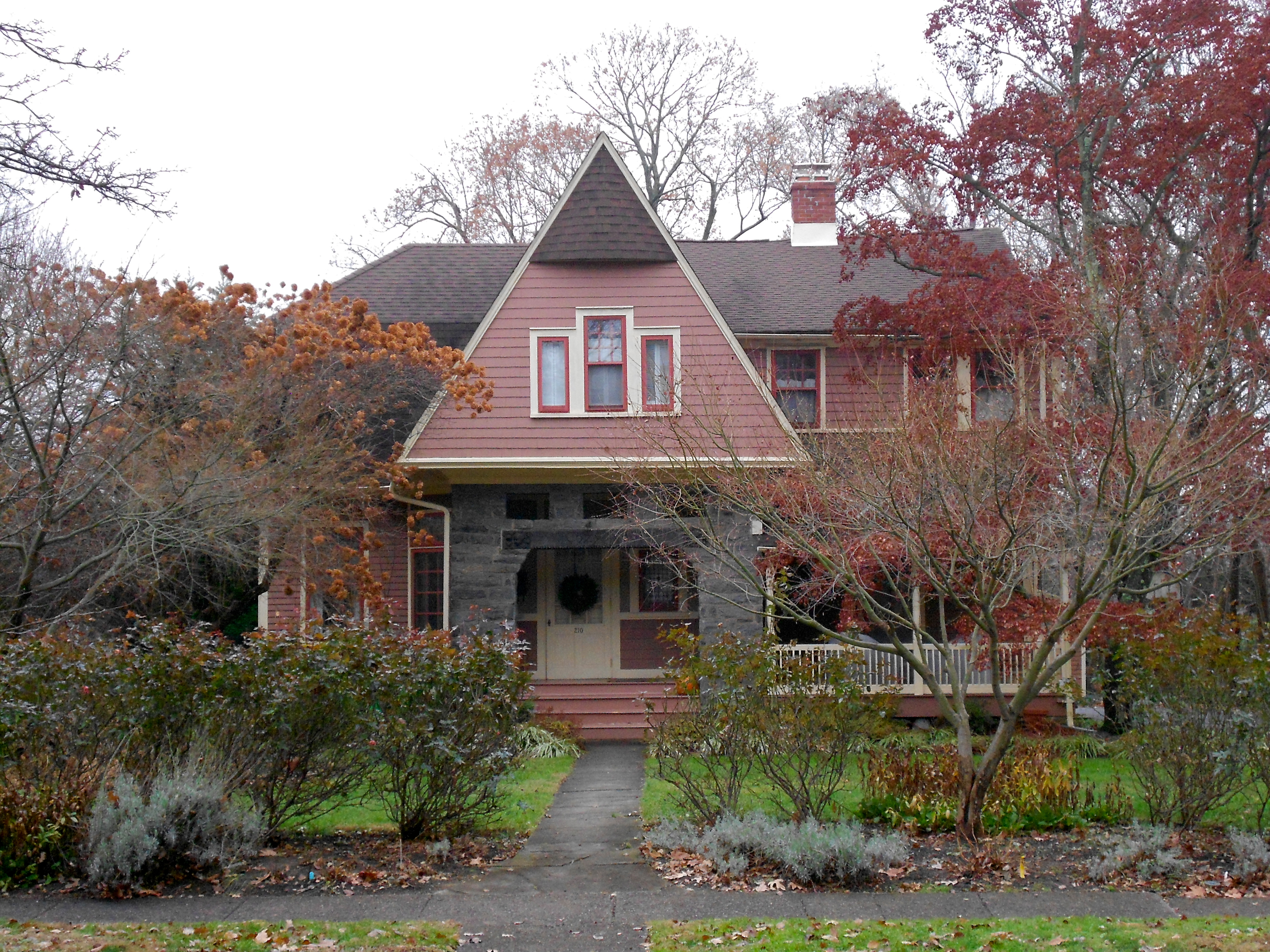
"Cozy Nook" at 210 Walnut, designed by J.C. Worthington

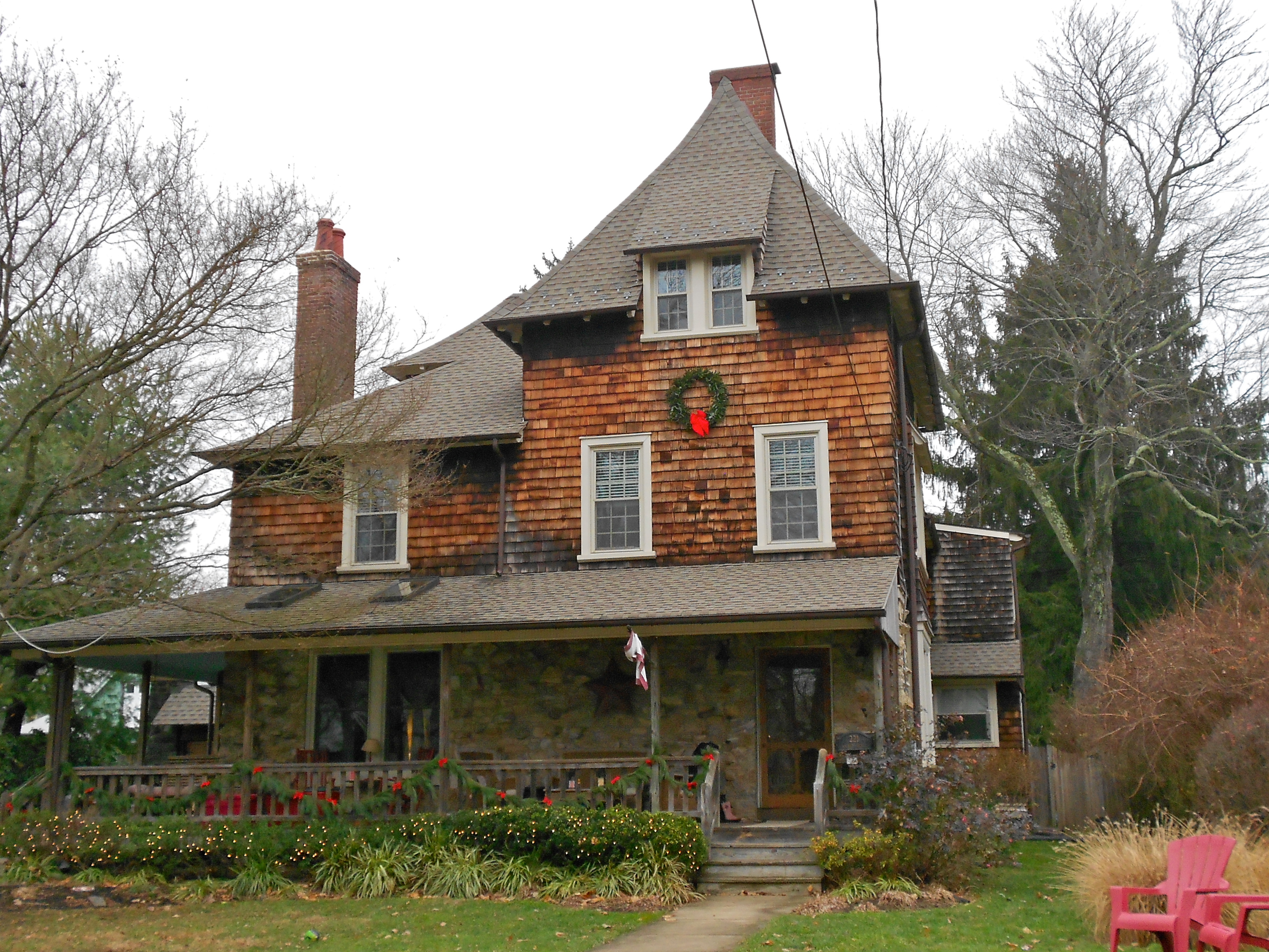
221 Walnut

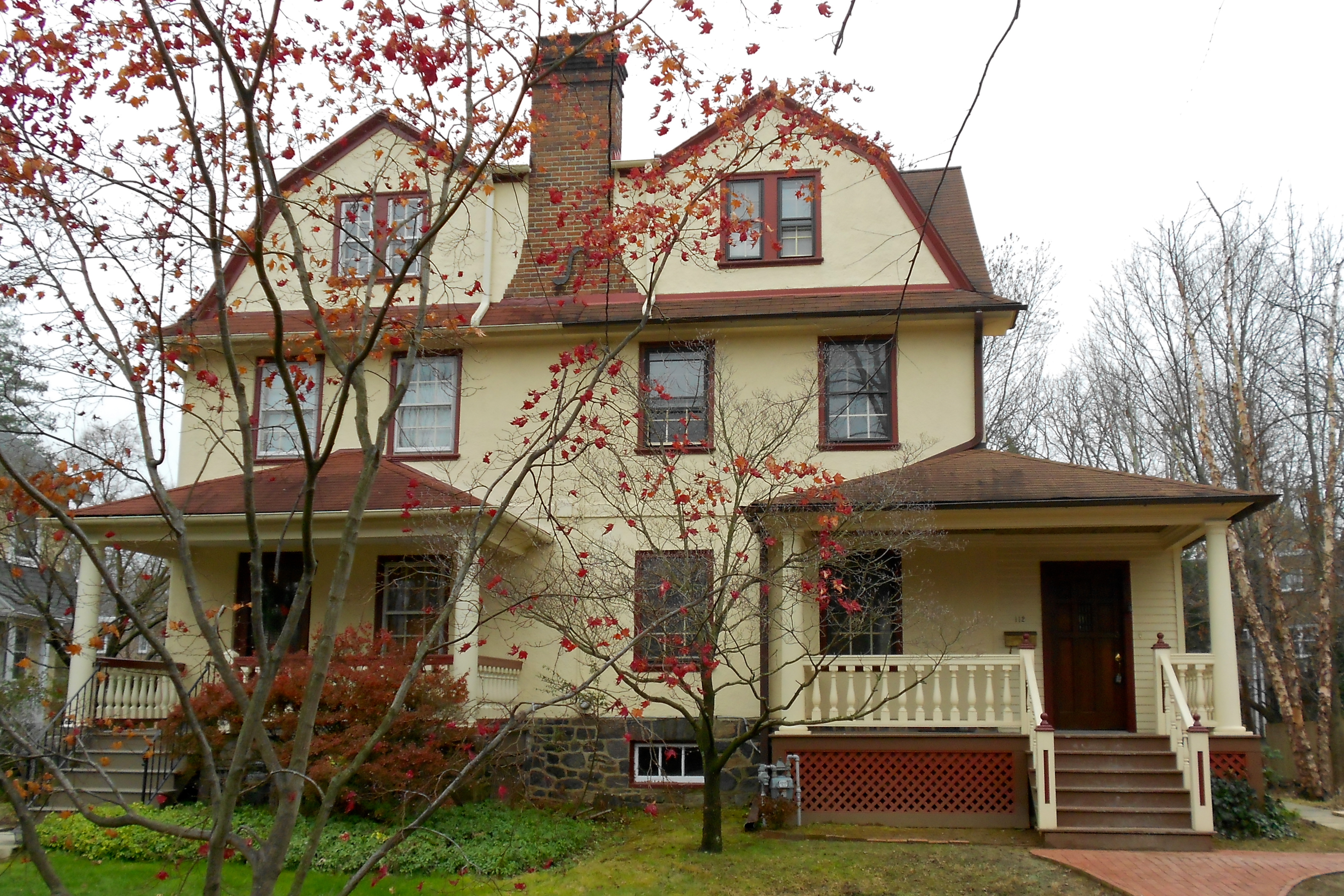
112 Poplar

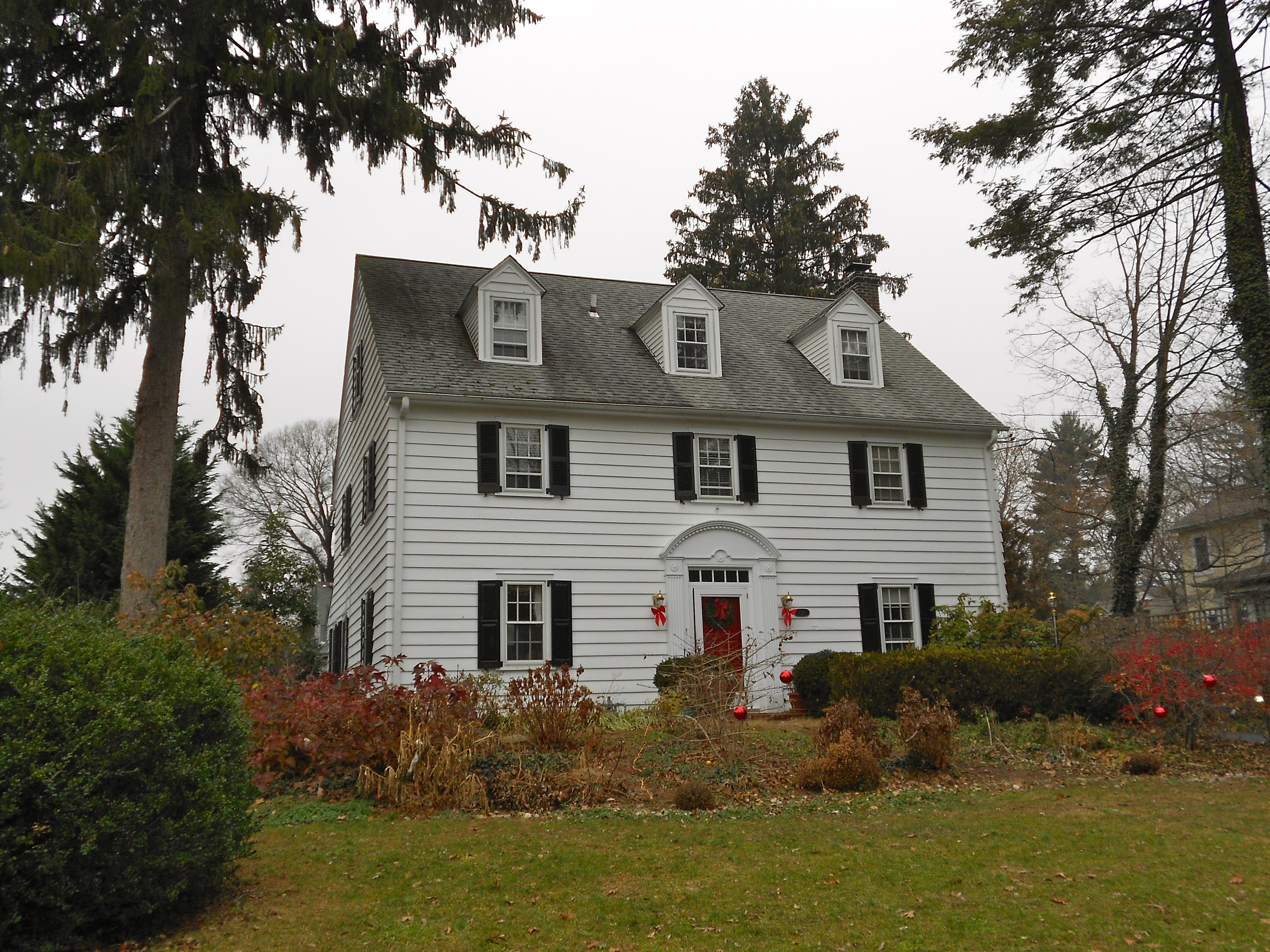
123 Poplar, in the Colonial Revival style

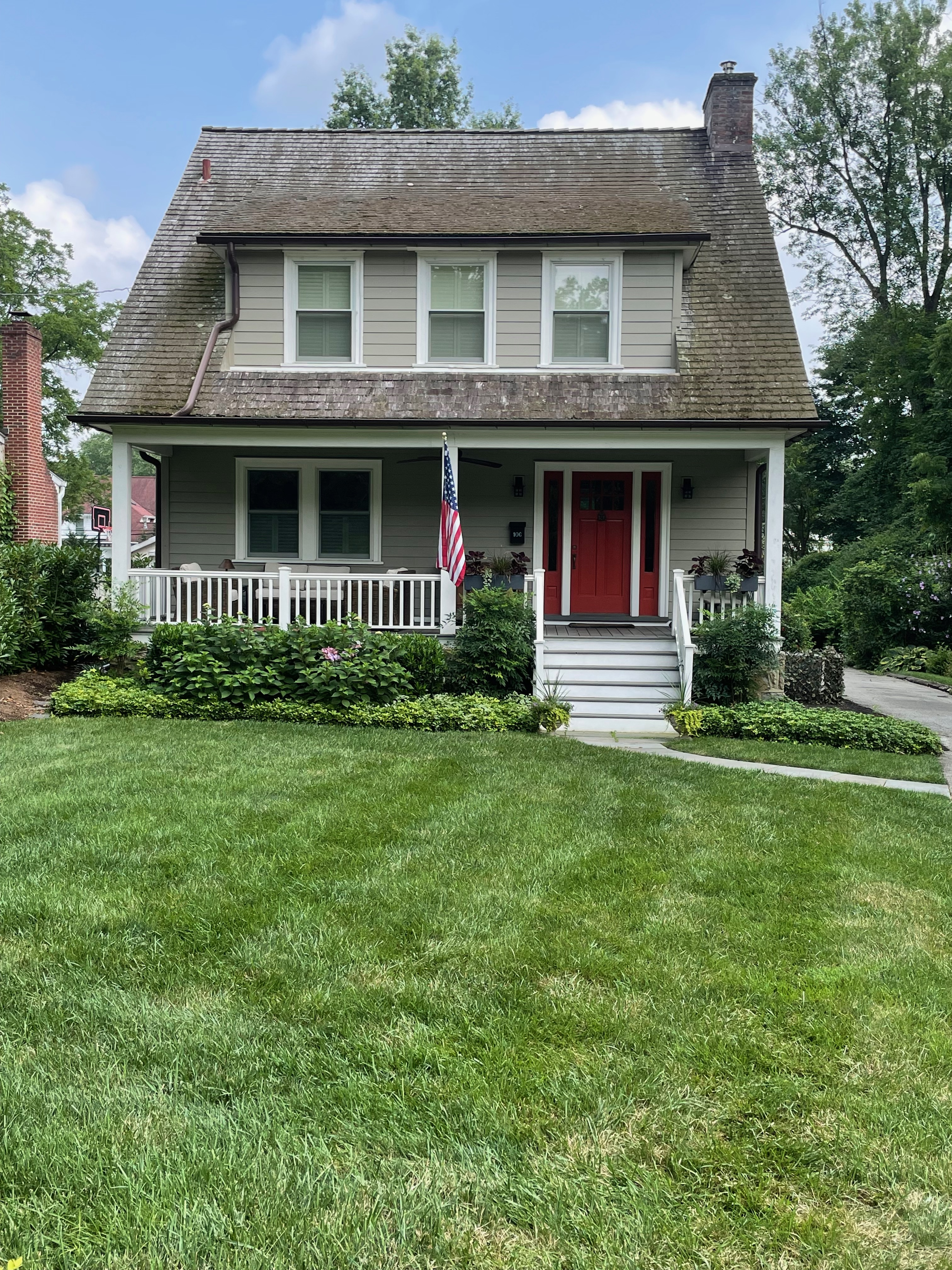
106 Walnut Avenue, Craftsman Bungalow 1919

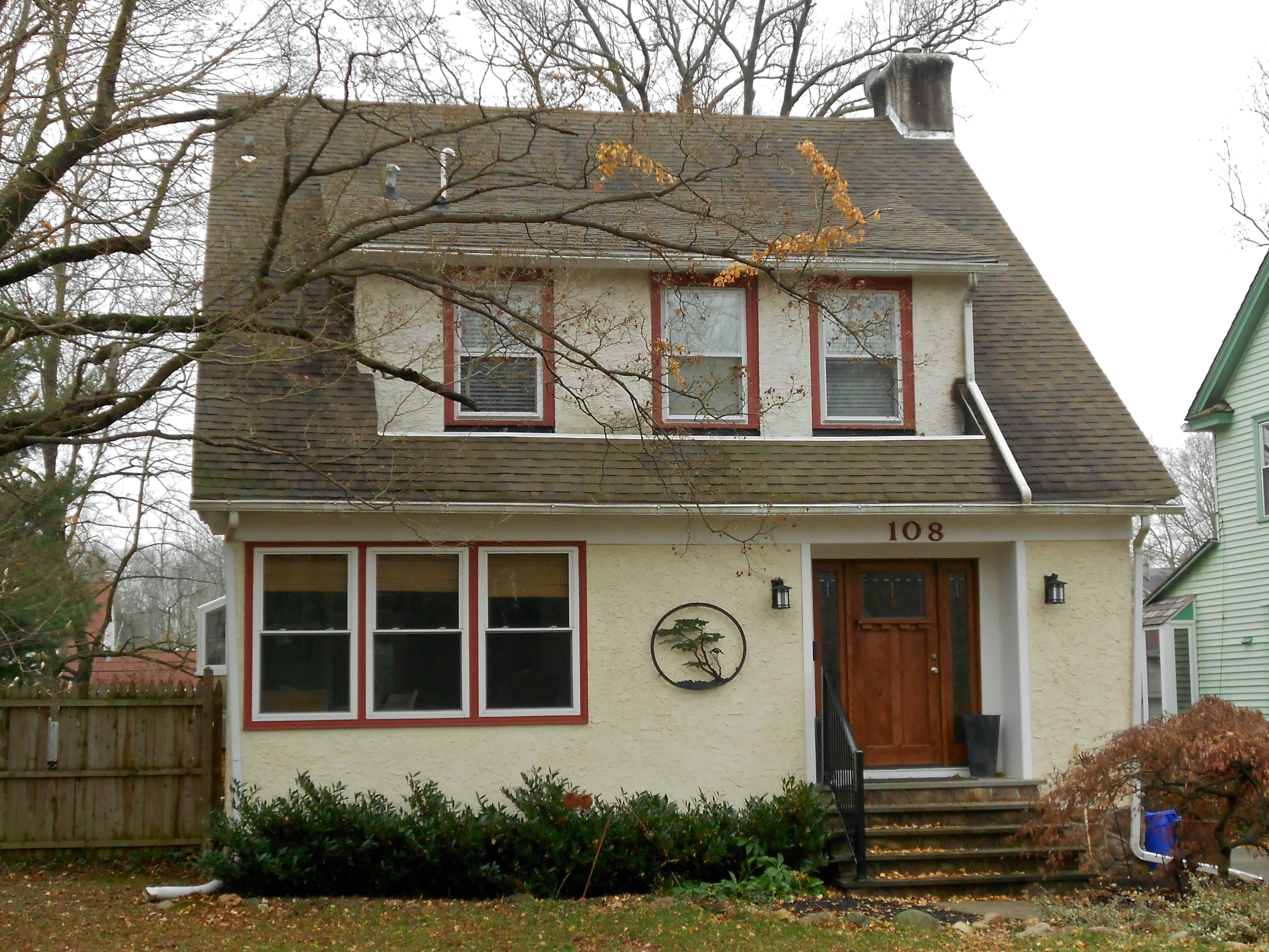
108 Walnut
