= South Wayne Historic District (Wayne, Pennsylvania) =

Historic district in Pennsylvania, United States

- U.S. National Register of Historic Places
- U.S. Historic district
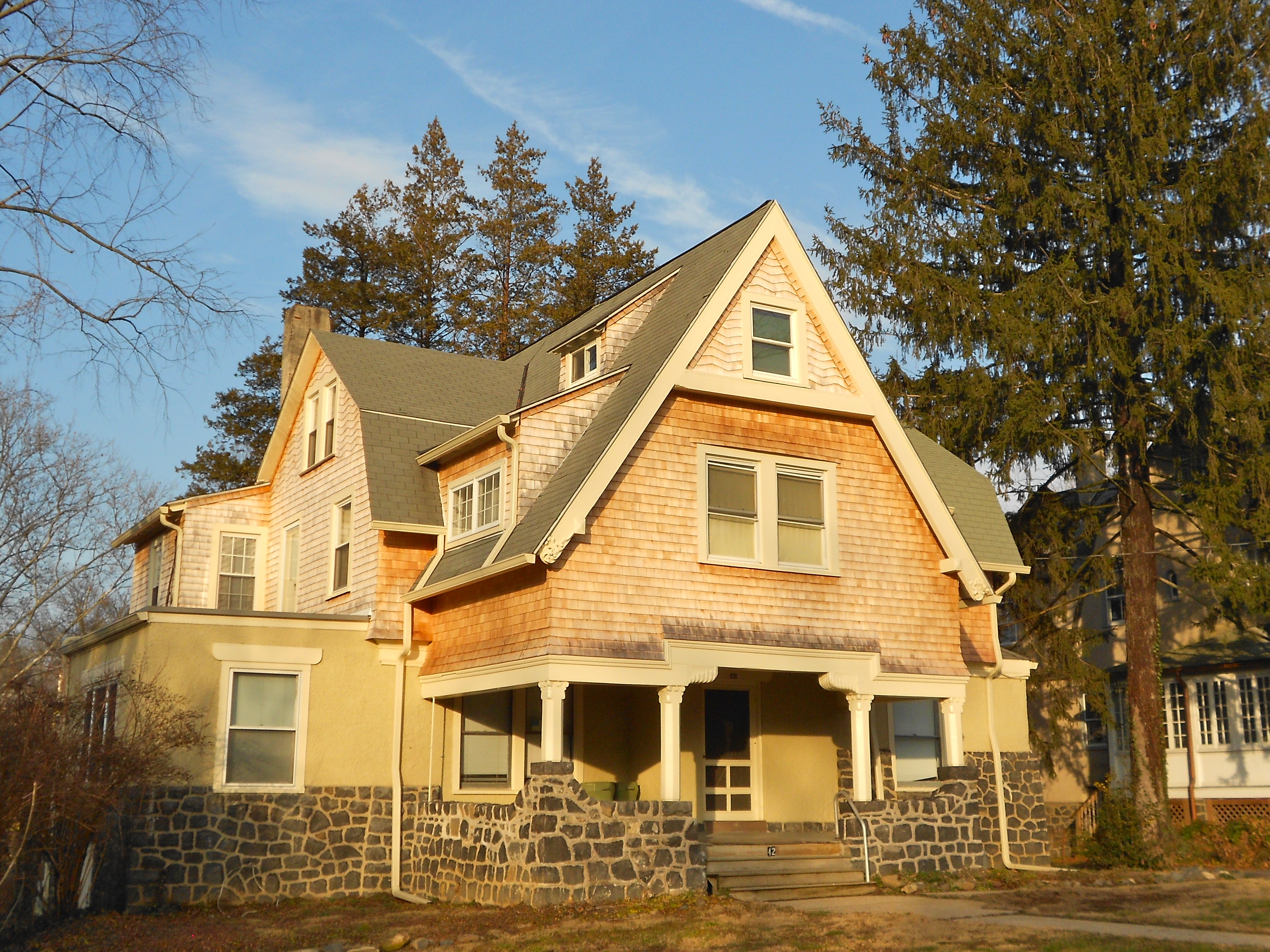
- House in the South Wayne Historic District

- Location within Pennsylvania Location within the United States
- Location: Roughly bounded by Lancaster Ave., Conestoga Rd. and Iven Ave., Radnor Township, Wayne, Pennsylvania
- Coordinates: 40°02′22″N 75°22′59″W
- Area: 270 acres (110 ha)
- Built: 1880
- Architect: Price, William Lightfoot; et al
- Architectural style: Late 19th And 20th Century Revivals, Late Victorian
- NRHP reference No.: 91000477
- Added to NRHP: April 18, 1991

The South Wayne Historic District is a national historic district that is located in Wayne, Delaware County, Pennsylvania.

It was added to the National Register of Historic Places in 1991.

== History and architectural features ==
This district includes 316 contributing buildings that are located in a residential area of Wayne. The majority of the dwellings were built between 1881 and 1930 and include notable examples of Shingle Style and Colonial Revival architecture, representing the work of William Lightfoot Price, Horace Trumbauer, and several other architects.

This historic district reflects suburban development in the late-nineteenth century. It was a major component of a large, planned, railroad commuter suburb called "the Wayne Estates," complementing the northern half of the residential area that is now included in the North Wayne Historic District, and the downtown area of Wayne, which sits between the two residential districts, now the Downtown Wayne Historic District.

== Gallery ==
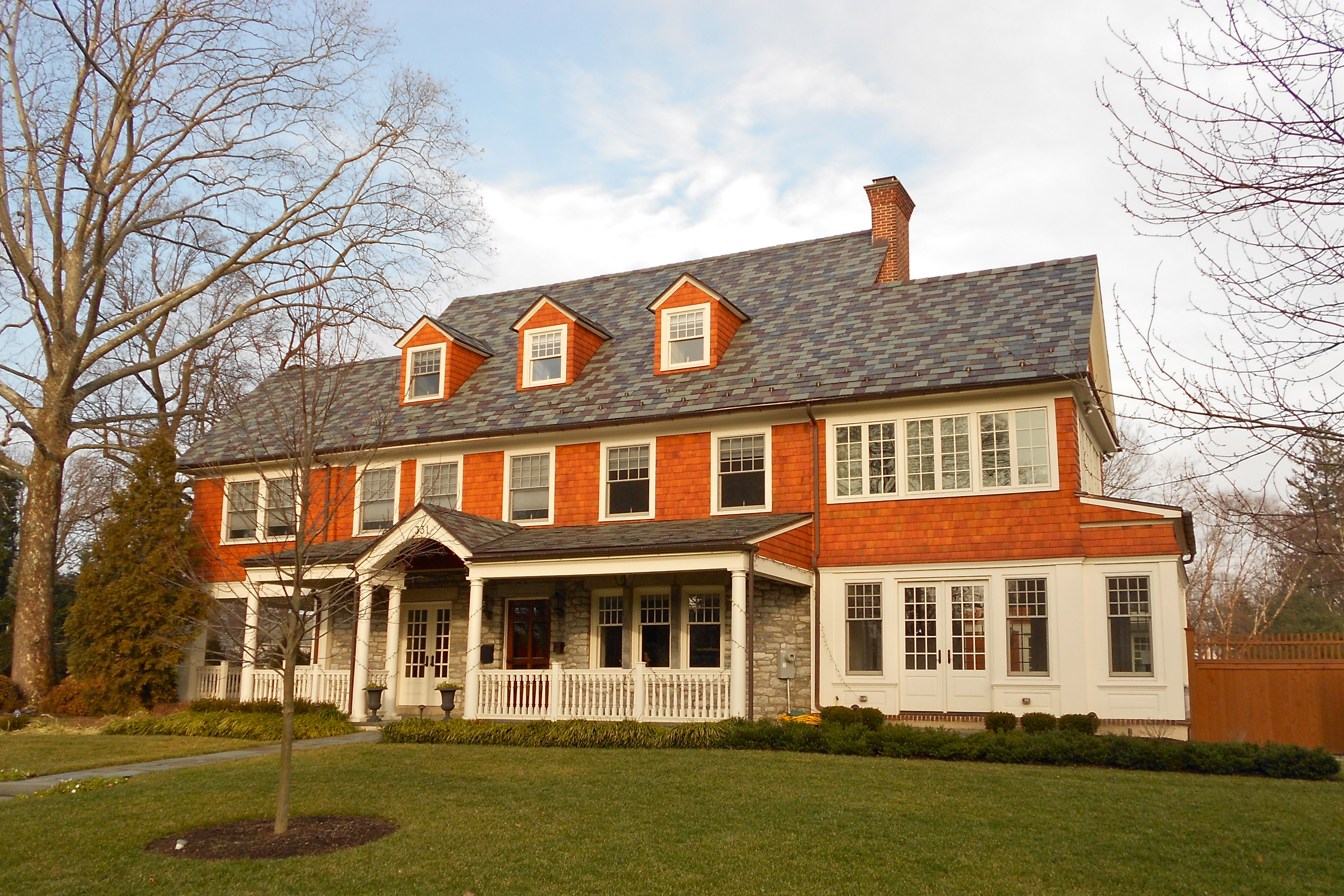
Louella Street

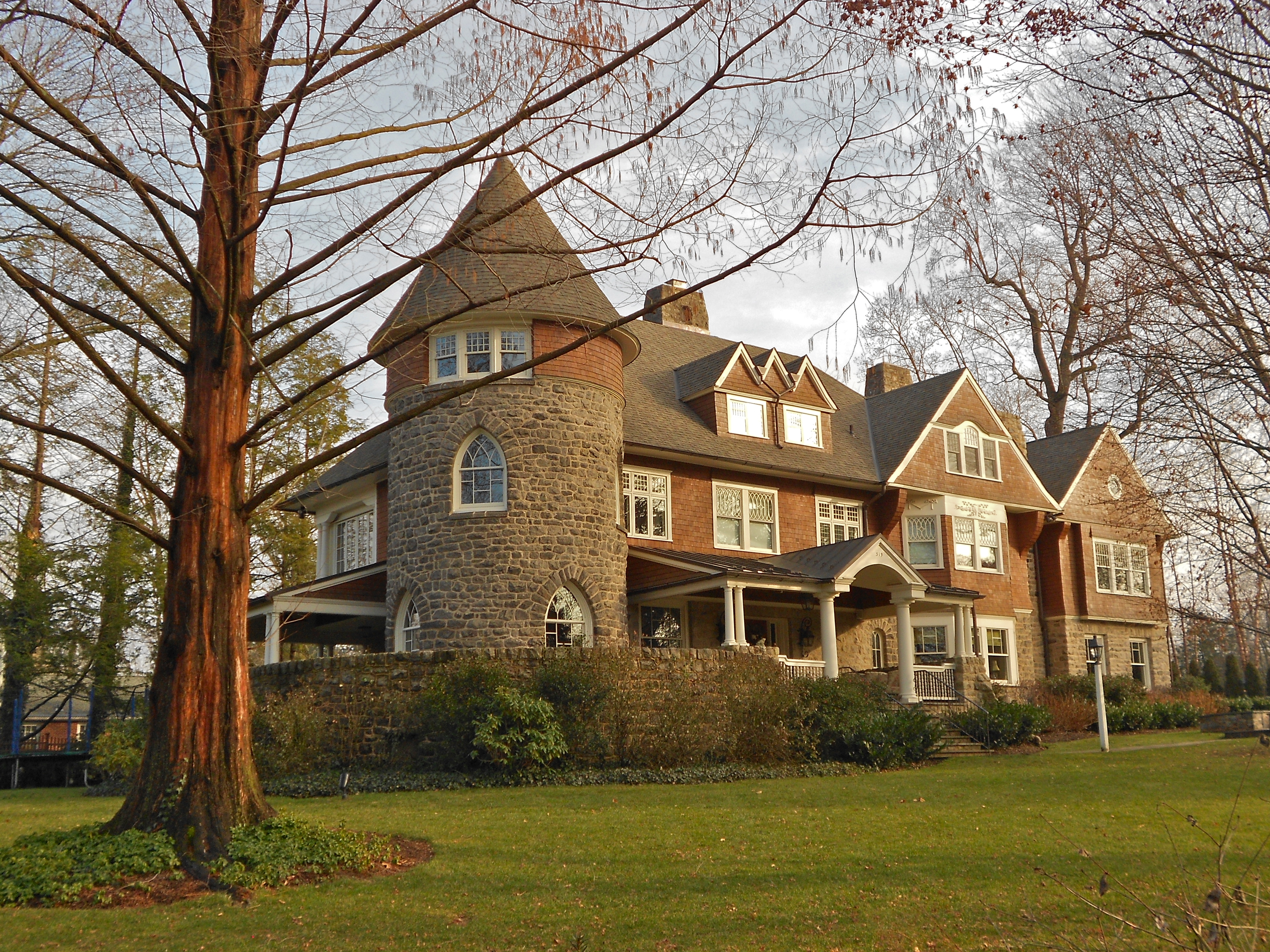
Louella Street; designed by Horace Trumbauer

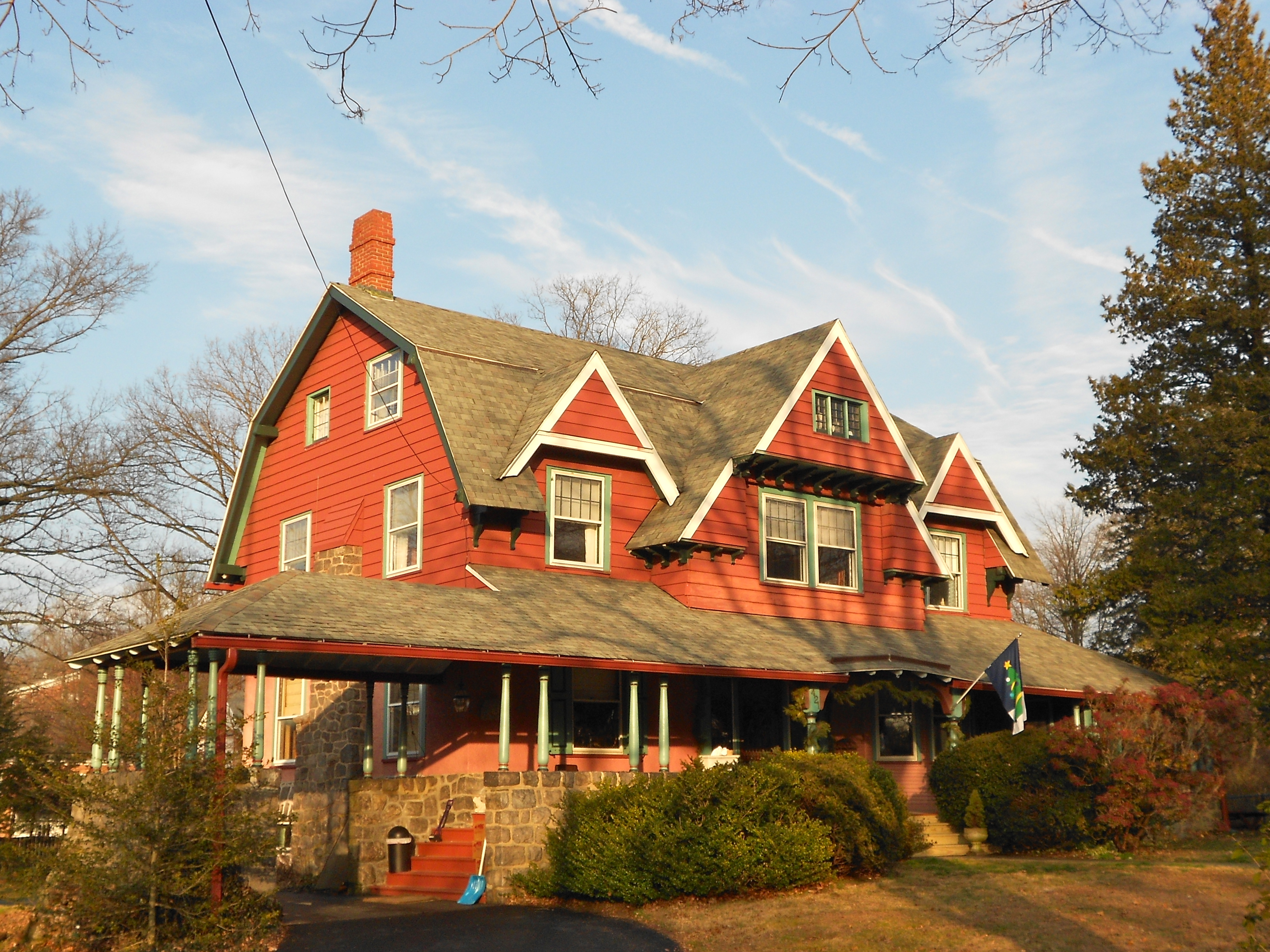
Midland Avenue

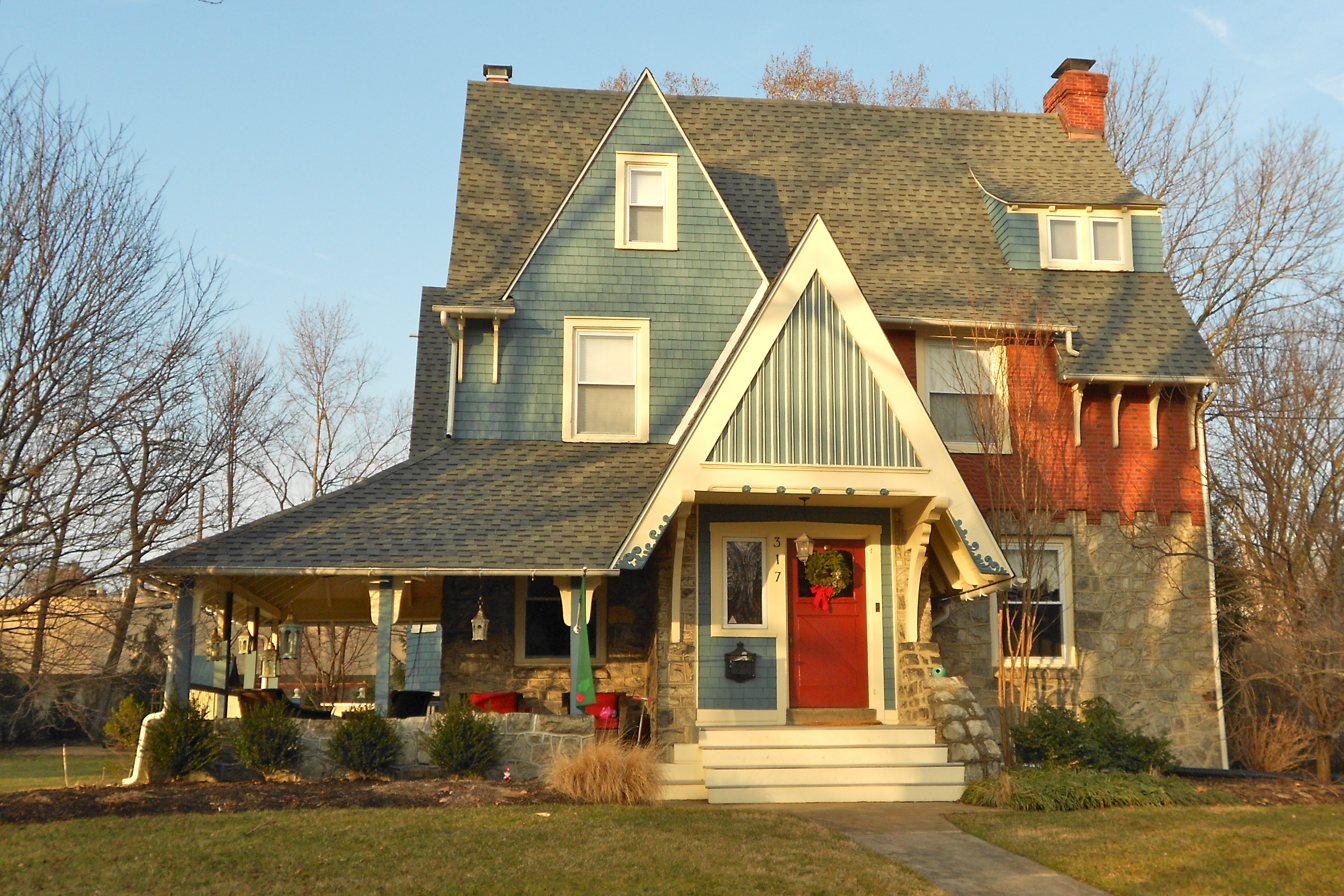
Midland Avenue; designed by William Lightfoot Price

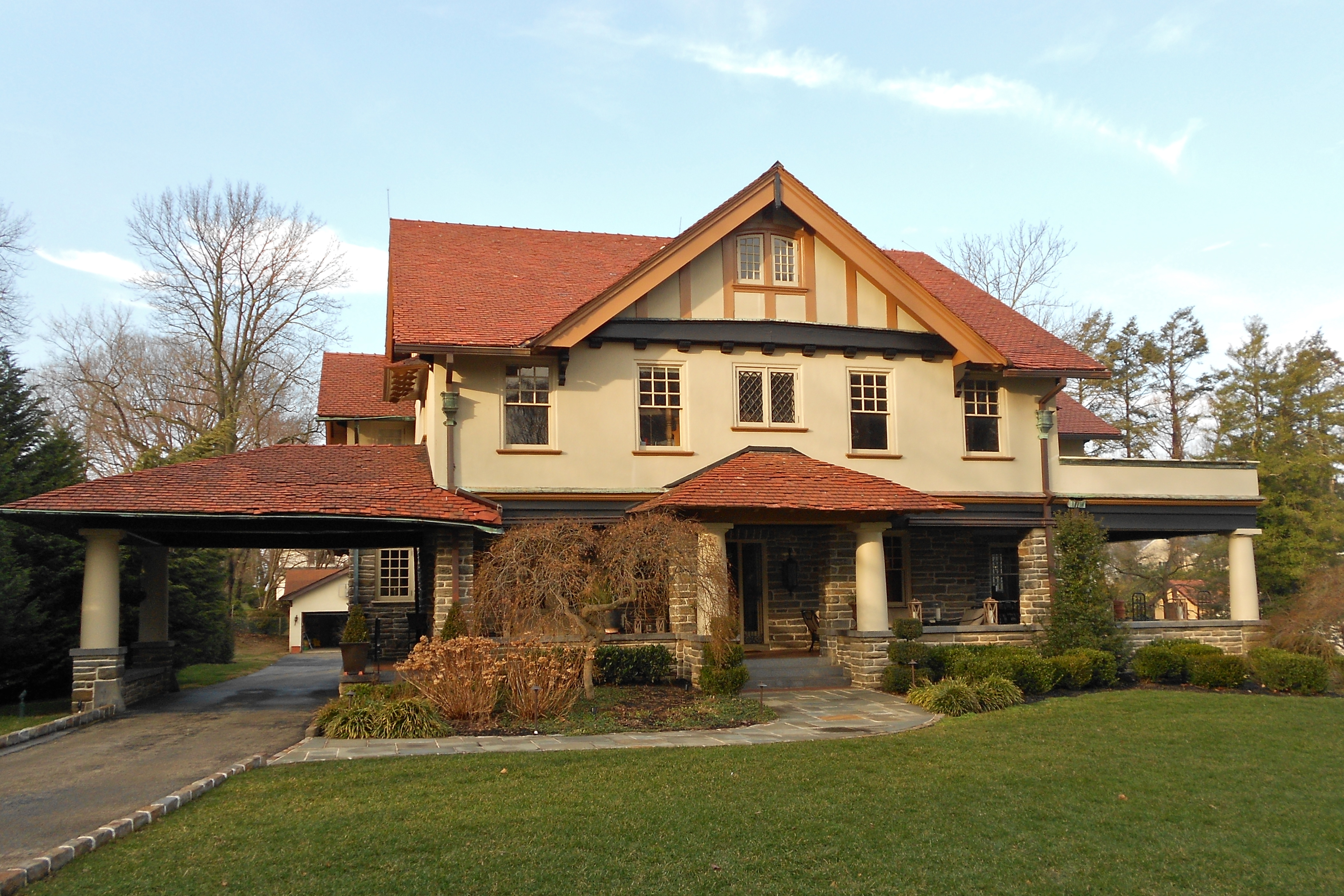
Pembroke Street
