= M (SEPTA) =

Light metro line in Pennsylvania

Norristown High Speed Line

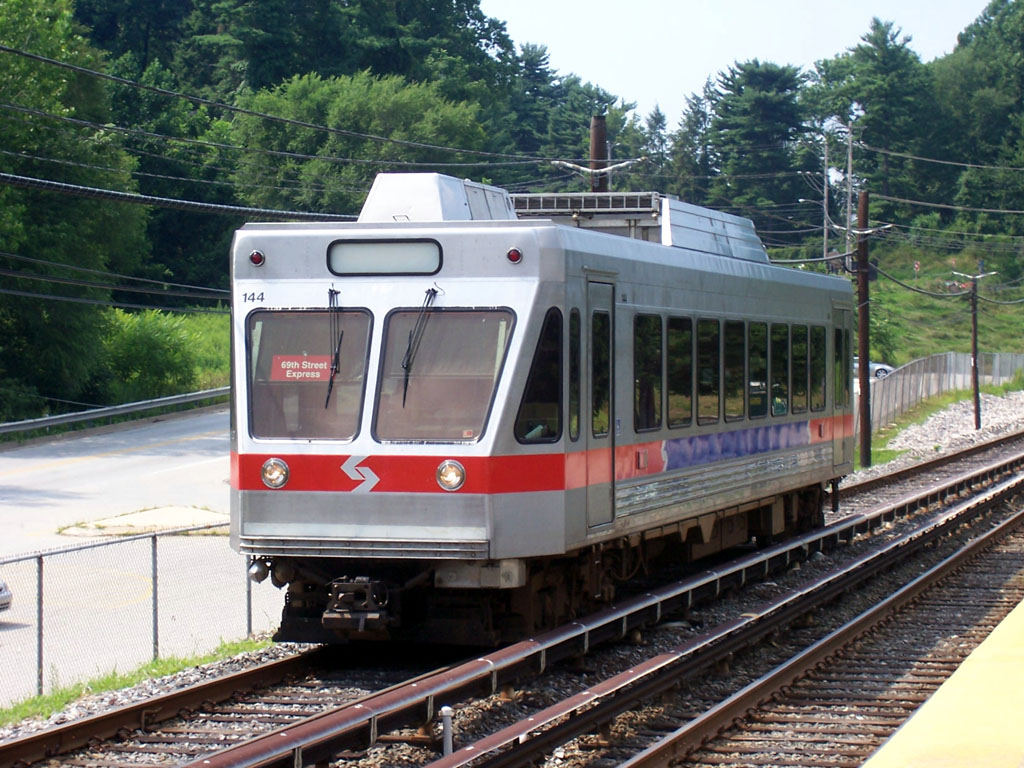
- SEPTA N-5 train #144 of the M as it enters the Gulph Mills station in Upper Merion, Pennsylvania.

Overview
- Locale: Delaware and Montgomery Counties, Pennsylvania, U.S.
- Termini: Norristown Transit Center; 69th Street Transit Center
- Stations: 22
- Website: septa.org/schedules/M1

Service
- Type: Light metro
- System: SEPTA Metro
- Services: Local
- Route number: 100 (former)
- Operator: SEPTA Suburban Division
- Rolling stock: 26 ASEA Type N-5 cars
- Daily ridership: 5,108 (2025, weekdays)

History
- Opened: 1907

Technical
- Line length: 13.4 mi (21.6 km)
- Num of tracks: 1–3
- Character: Surface (grade separated)
- Track gauge: 4 ft 8 1/2 in (1,435 mm) standard gauge
- Electrification: Third rail, 600 V DC
- Operating speed: 24 mph (39 km/h) (avg.); 55 mph (89 km/h) (top)
Route map
Template:M (SEPTA)

The M, (Note: Conventions for line names state they are to be referred to by letter only (i.e. "the M", not "the M line")) also known as the Norristown High Speed Line, formerly abbreviated as the NHSL, (Note: Also known as the P&W or Route 100) is a 13.4-mile (21.6 km) light metro line in the SEPTA Metro network, running between the 69th Street Transit Center in Upper Darby and the Norristown Transit Center in Norristown, Pennsylvania. Service is operated by the Suburban Transit Division of the Southeastern Pennsylvania Transportation Authority. Originally the Philadelphia and Western Railroad line, the line runs entirely on its own right-of-way. In spring 2025, the M had an average weekday ridership of 5,108.

The M is unique in its combination of transportation technologies. Originally chartered as a Class I (steam) railroad, the line is fully grade separated, collects power from a third rail, and has high-level platforms common to rapid transit systems or commuter rail systems such as New York City's Long Island Rail Road and Metro-North Railroad, but has onboard fare collection, mostly single-car operation, and frequent stops more common to light rail systems. Previously, the M was considered to be a light rail line, according to a 2008 SEPTA budget report; however, the line is currently considered an interurban heavy rail line, according to a 2009 SEPTA business plan, and subsequent capital budgets. It has also been categorized by the American Public Transportation Association as "Intermodal High Speed rapid rail transit".

The purple color-coded line was formerly known simply as Route 100, changed to the Norristown High Speed Line in September 2009, and to its current name in 2025.

== History ==
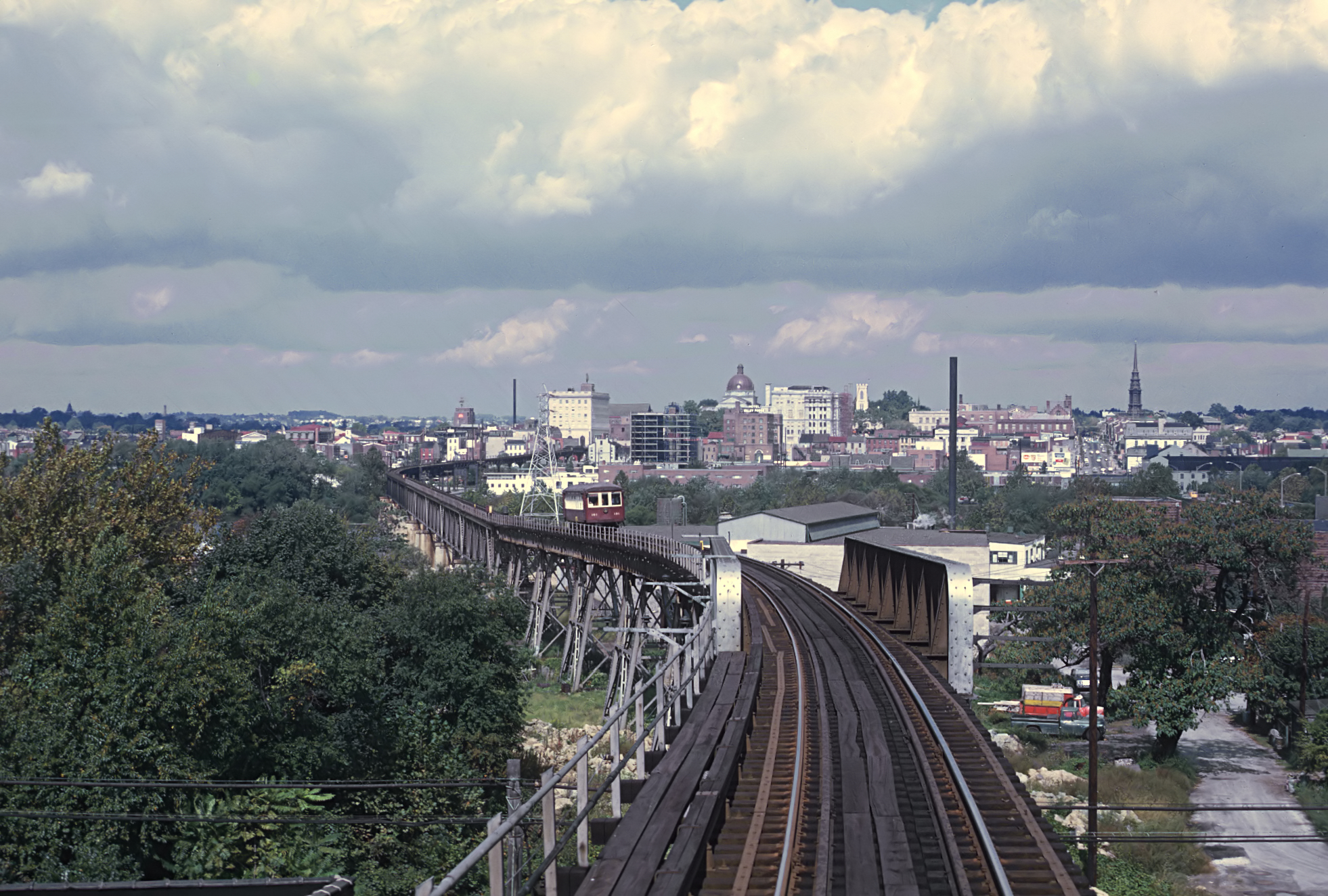
The long trestle of the M with Norristown in the background, September 1969

The M began service in 1907 as the Philadelphia and Western Railroad (P&W), which ran from the present 69th Street Transit Center in Upper Darby Township, Pennsylvania to a converted farmhouse station in Strafford, Pennsylvania. In 1911, the line was extended 0.47 miles (0.76 km) west to a new Strafford P&W station adjacent to the Pennsylvania Railroad's Strafford station, allowing easy interchange between the two lines. In 1912, a 6.2-mile (10 km) branch was constructed from Villanova Junction, 0.33 miles (0.53 km) west of the existing Villanova station, to Norristown. When the newly built branch quickly attracted more ridership than the Strafford main line, the Norristown section became the main line and the Strafford stretch was demoted to branch status; in the mid-1930s, the Strafford spur was narrowed to a single track for its last 1.74 miles (2.8 km) between the Wayne-St. Davids and Strafford stations, while the Norristown line received a sleek new art deco terminus at Main and Swede Streets.

=== Lehigh Valley connection ===
From Norristown, the P&W RR connected its tracks with the Lehigh Valley Transit Liberty Bell Route to provide direct electric train service from 69th St. Terminal to Allentown, Pennsylvania. However, in 1951, the Lehigh Valley Transit Company ended its service on the Liberty Bell Route, and in 1953 the company ended all its remaining rail service. Two years later, the P&W RR was taken over by the Philadelphia Suburban Transportation Company (PSTC), which was more popularly known as the Red Arrow Lines. In 1956, the Red Arrow abandoned the original branch between Villanova and Strafford, leaving only electric MU train service between 69th Street and Norristown, as it is today. Part of the Strafford branch right of way has been converted into the Radnor Trail. The PSTC was absorbed into SEPTA in 1970, eliminating the original railroad charter and immediately becoming the "Norristown High-Speed Line Trolley", officially known as Route 100.

=== Modernization ===
By the mid-1980s, the line was in dire condition as the Brill Bullet rolling stock reached over 50 years in service. Cars suffered electrical fires and crashes, even causing a shutdown of the line for a number of months in 1985 and 1986, since many of the cars were inoperable. Full service was only restored in December 1986, as SEPTA introduced former CTA 6000 series elevated cars into service. In 1990, as the last Brill Bullet cars were retired, former Market-Frankford line M-3 "almond joy" cars were also introduced, running alongside the CTA cars.

In the late 1980s and early 1990s, the line underwent a significant modernization program, rebuilding or improving then-dated tracks, electrical substations, the signaling system, bridges, both terminal buildings, and the maintenance depot. In addition to these right-of-way improvements, the new ASEA N-5 rolling stock entered service starting in 1993.

=== Ridership ===
Ridership on the Norristown Line peaked in 2016 at 3,429,300. The previous peak came in 2014 with 3,147,209 trips. Prior to this modern escalation in ridership the line's ridership was highest in 1973 at 2.86 million annual linked trips, and again in 1980 with 2.579 million annual linked trips. Ridership statistics for fiscal years 2000 and later are from SEPTA annual service plans. Data for years 1972 to 1997 are from the SEPTA 1997 ridership census. There may be some discrepancy in how the ridership is reported since the pre-1997 ridership census uses embedded linked trips, which may exclude passengers transferring from other lines, while the post-2000 annual service plans report total rider trips.

Fiscal year	Average weekday	Annual passengers
FY 2023	4,197	
FY 2019	10,893	
FY 2018	10,525	
FY 2017	11,080	3,106,320
FY 2016		3,429,300
FY 2015		3,147,209
FY 2005	8,801	2,512,690
FY 2004	8,428	2,463,500
FY 2003	7,925	2,491,074
FY 2000	9,250	3,046,927

Fiscal year	Annual linked trips	Fiscal year	Annual linked trips
1997	1,754,000	1984	2,338,000
1996	1,696,000	1983	2,484,000
1995	1,926,000	1982	2,089,000
1994	2,079,000	1981	1,899,000
1993	2,251,000	1980	2,579,000
1992	2,222,000	1979	2,133,000
1991	2,234,000	1978	1,992,000
1990	2,162,000	1977	1,832,000
1989	2,295,000	1976	2,218,000
1988	2,185,000	1975	2,162,000
1987	1,888,000	1974	2,425,000
1986	1,915,000	1973	2,860,000
1985	2,255,000	1972	2,496,000

=== 21st century ===
Two-car M1 train bound for 69th Street Transit Center arriving at Gulph Mills station

Effective September 5, 2010, SEPTA changed the names of four stations to reflect the streets on which they were located. Township Line Road (formerly West Overbrook station), Roberts Road (formerly Rosemont station), Stadium – Ithan Avenue (formerly Stadium station) and DeKalb Street (formerly King Manor station).

In summer 2013, SEPTA closed the Bridgeport Viaduct, which carries the M over the Schuylkill River for four months. The bridge, which was built in 1911, had been deteriorating and needed to be rebuilt at a cost upwards of $30 million, though this repair project was budgeted at $7.5 million. As a result of closing the bridge, buses were used to transport passengers between the Bridgeport station and the Norristown Transit Center. The bridge was reopened in November 2013. The remaining $30 million renovation of the entire bridge structure is currently unscheduled.

In 2021, SEPTA proposed rebranding their rail transit service as "SEPTA Metro", in order to make the system easier to navigate. Under this proposal, the Norristown High Speed Line was rebranded as the "M" (for "Montgomery", the county in which Norristown is located), with a purple color and numeric suffixes for service variants. The local service was called the M1 Montgomery Local and the peak-hour express service was to be called the M2 Montgomery Express. Had the proposed spur to King of Prussia (KOP) been constructed, the proposal would have included services such as the M3 Montgomery Local to KOP, the M4 Montgomery Express to King of Prussia, providing service between 69th Street Transit Center, and First & Moore/Valley Forge station, and the M5 Norristown / King of Prussia, making local stops between First and Moore/Valley Forge station and Norristown Transit Center. After a period of public comment, SEPTA revised its plans to primarily refer to the line as the "M", and local service as the "M1".

In 2026, SEPTA announced another round of repairs were necessary on the Bridgeport Viaduct. Sections of the line are planned to close for a period of 20 weeks, with three construction phases beginning in March 2026 and ending in February 2027. The repairs include repainting, concrete deck replacement, and lancing bar and rivet repairs.

In the "SEPTA Accelerate" strategic plan, released in September 2026, the agency unveiled long-term plans to replace the current set of trains on the M. The new vehicles will feature greater accessibility and passenger amenities.

== Service ==
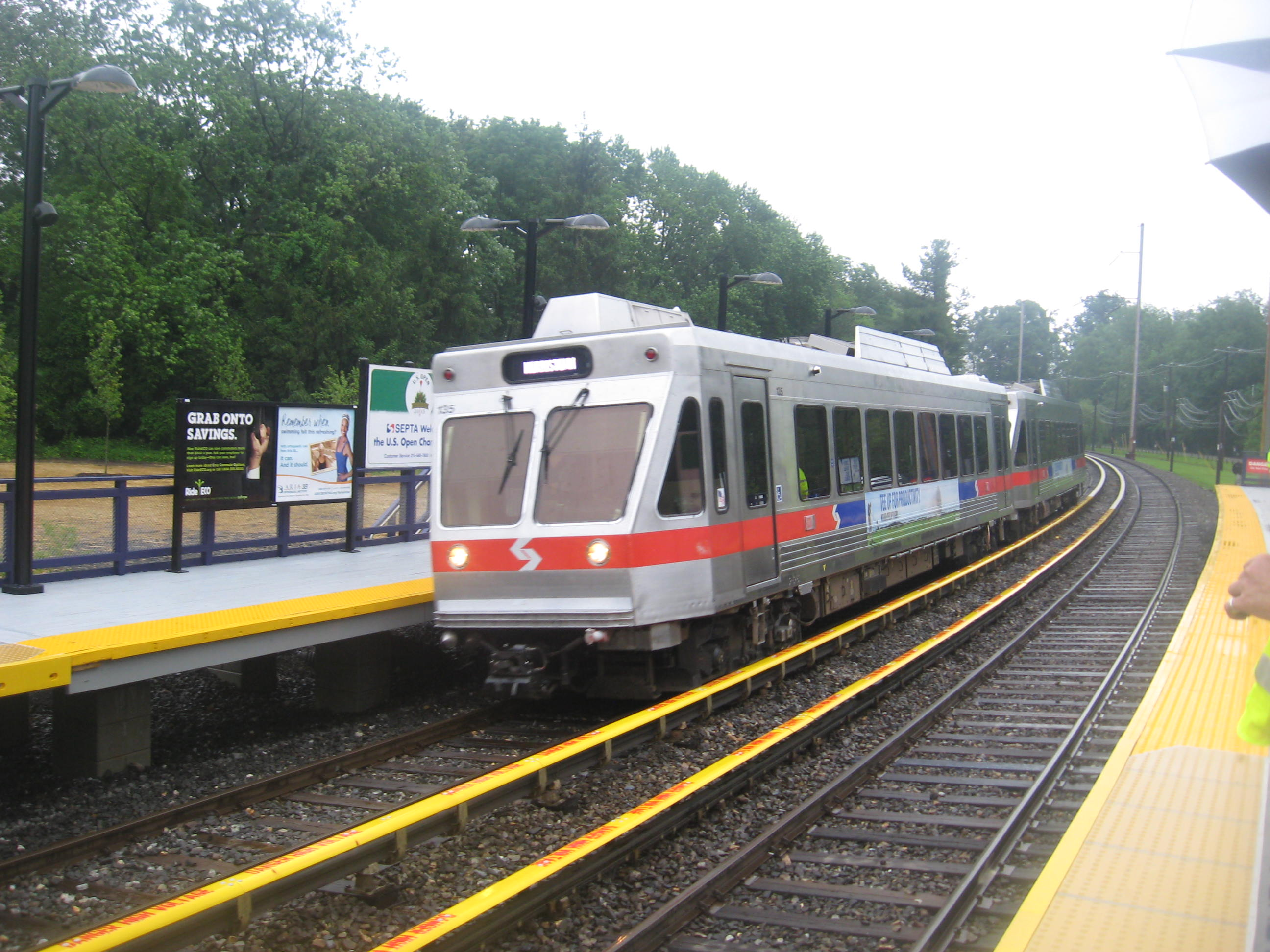
The NHSL ran two-car trains and played a pivotal role in the infrastructure of the 2013 U.S. Open at Merion Golf Club.

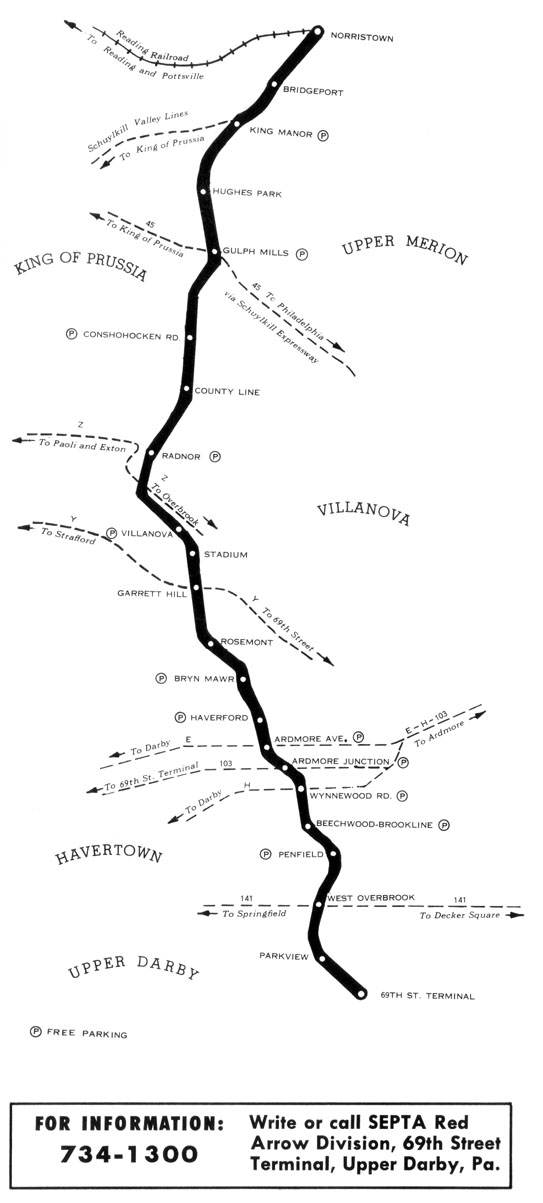
A 1974 map of Route 100

The fare for a single ride as of September 2025 is $2.90 on all payment methods, including cash, contactless payments, or the Travel Wallet feature on a SEPTA Key card. Until September 1, 2014, the line used a "pay-as-you-exit" fare collection system on trains towards 69th Street Transit Center. As part of a general change on several routes approaching 69th Street, passengers now pay onboard upon entering the train. Starting February 22, 2021, fares at 69th Street Transit Center and Norristown Transit Center are collected from station turnstiles at all times.

The service runs seven days a week from 5 AM to 2 AM. Local trains from 69th Street to Norristown stop at all 22 stations, and the trip lasts approximately 30 minutes. Occasionally, local trains may run only between 69th Street and Bryn Mawr, stopping at ten stations, or 69th Street and Hughes Park, stopping at 18 stations.

Before 2019, during weekday peak periods (6:00–9:00 AM, 2:15–6:45 PM), the line featured express and limited services, which stopped only at select stations, therefore decreasing travel time between 69th Street and Norristown. Norristown Express service, denoted by red destination signs, traveled between 69th Street and Norristown in approximately 22 minutes, stopping at only 16 stations. Norristown Limited service, denoted by blue destination signs, traveled between 69th Street and Norristown in approximately 26 minutes and stopped at 8 stations. All trains shared the same two tracks, so a limited leaving Norristown, for example, would be immediately followed by a local, which stopped at more stations, and therefore was spaced farther from the previous train. The next limited would catch up with it. Similarly, a local may leave Bryn Mawr right after an express stopped there, and get to 69th Street just before the next express or limited caught up with it.

A former Hughes Park Express service, which was denoted by green destination signs, traveled nonstop from 69th Street to Beechwood–Brookline and made all stops from there to Hughes Park in approximately 22 minutes.

Prior to December 2020, boarding passengers at non-terminal stops on the train would have to press a button on the platform, which turns on a light that tells the operator to stop at the station. After December 7, 2020, the passenger advance lights were discontinued. Trains would now only stop at stations with physically visible passengers. Passengers on the M use request buttons to signal alighting.

== Stations ==
Location	Miles (km)	Station	Notes/Connections	Weekday Boardings (2018)	Weekday Boardings (2024)
Upper Darby	0.0 (0.0)	69th Street Transit Center	SEPTA Metro: SEPTA City Bus: 21, 30, 65, 68; SEPTA Suburban Bus: 103, 104, 105, 107, 108, 109, 110, 111, 112, 113, 120, 123, 126	4,965	2,049
Upper Darby	0.7 (1.1)	Parkview		66	88
Haverford	1.4 (2.3)	Township Line Road	SEPTA Suburban Bus: 103	83	89
Haverford	1.9 (3.1)	Penfield		288	89
Haverford	2.5 (4.0)	Beechwood–Brookline		210	97
Haverford	3.1 (5.0)	Wynnewood Road		140	84
Haverford	3.4 (5.5)	Ardmore Junction	SEPTA Suburban Bus: 103	500	172
Haverford	3.9 (6.3)	Ardmore Avenue		116	69
Haverford	4.5 (7.2)	Haverford South		145	93
Radnor	5.4 (8.7)	Bryn Mawr South		562	283
Radnor	5.9 (9.5)	Roberts Road		65	50
Radnor	6.4 (10.3)	Garrett Hill		562	64
Radnor	6.8 (10.9)	Stadium		NO DATA	81
Radnor	7.0 (11.3)	Villanova South	SEPTA Suburban Bus: 105	357	85
Radnor	7.9 (12.7)	Radnor South	SEPTA Suburban Bus: 105	462	200
Lower Merion	8.6 (13.8)	County Line		14	NO DATA
Lower Merion	9.4 (15.1)	Matsonford		32	44
Upper Merion	10.3 (16.6)	Gulph Mills	SEPTA Suburban Bus: 95, 124, 125	577	212
Upper Merion	11.0 (17.7)	Hughes Park		339	128
Bridgeport	12.3 (19.8)	DeKalb Street	SEPTA Suburban Bus: 99	314	166
Bridgeport	12.8 (20.6)	Bridgeport		106	89
Norristown	13.4 (21.6)	Norristown Transit Center	SEPTA Regional Rail: SEPTA Suburban Bus: 90, 91, 93, 96, 97, 98, 99, 131	1,441	861

== King of Prussia Spur ==
Map of the Red Arrow Lines showing the current M in blue; the former branch to Strafford is dashed, and the former trolley routes: D1 (101), D2 (102), 103 and 104 (red, still in use, and orange, disbanded)

In 2013, it was proposed to create a branch off the then-Norristown High Speed Line to serve the King of Prussia Mall, Valley Forge office parks, and the Valley Forge Casino Resort. Many possible routes were planned for this extension, including one following US 202 from Norristown to King of Prussia, another following a utility right-of-way paralleling US 202 and the Pennsylvania Turnpike, and another following the utility right-of-way and Gulph Road. In 2014, SEPTA estimated that the expansion would cost between $500 million to $650 million, and was at least eight years away.

On February 29, 2016, SEPTA announced the preferred route based on cost-efficiency and environmental impact. The route would have branched off from the then-Norristown High Speed Line between Hughes Park and DeKalb Street, followed a PECO transmission line right-of-way to the Pennsylvania Turnpike, and then run parallel to the Turnpike to reach the King of Prussia Mall. It would then have followed Mall Boulevard before crossing the Turnpike and following First Avenue. Stations would have been located at Henderson Road, Allendale Road, Mall Boulevard, the intersection of First and Clark Avenues in the King of Prussia Business Park, and at First Avenue near the Valley Forge Casino Resort.

On January 25, 2018, the SEPTA board approved a final route alignment, selecting the locally preferred routing from among the options studied in the project's draft environmental impact statement (EIS). The 4.5-mile (7.2 km) line was estimated to cost between $1 billion and $1.2 billion, with ridership estimated at 9,500 daily by 2040. In January 2019, SEPTA engaged the engineering firm HNTB to design Phase I of the project. On December 1, 2020, SEPTA held a meeting to update the proposed alignment. The final environmental impact statement was planned to be submitted to the Federal Transit Administration (FTA) in early 2021. Construction on the spur to King of Prussia was projected to cost $2 billion and service was expected to begin between 2025 and 2027.

Five new stations were to be added to the line as follows:

- Henderson Road station
- Allendale Road station
- Mall Boulevard station
- First & American Forge station
- First & Moore/Valley Forge station (terminus)

On March 17, 2023, SEPTA stopped work on the spur to King of Prussia after determining it would not have the money to proceed forward after the FTA denied a capital grant to the project.

== Accidents ==
There have been multiple collisions and incidents on the line. The first recorded crash occurred near an Ardmore stop on January 26, 1987, injuring 19. The operator tested positive for drugs and was convicted on reckless endangerment. Another crash occurred on July 6, 2012, between Beechwood-Brookline and Penfield stations when the cars detached and came back together, injuring two. In August 2017, there was a crash involving an unoccupied railcar at the 69th Street Transit Center that injured more than 40 people. As a result, the maximum operating speed on the line was decreased to 55 mph (89 km/h) from 70 mph (110 km/h).

== See also ==
- Electroliner
- Light rapid transit
- Mattapan Line, a similar rapid transit line in Boston
