= Ardmore Junction station =

Rapid transit station in Pennsylvania

Ardmore Junction
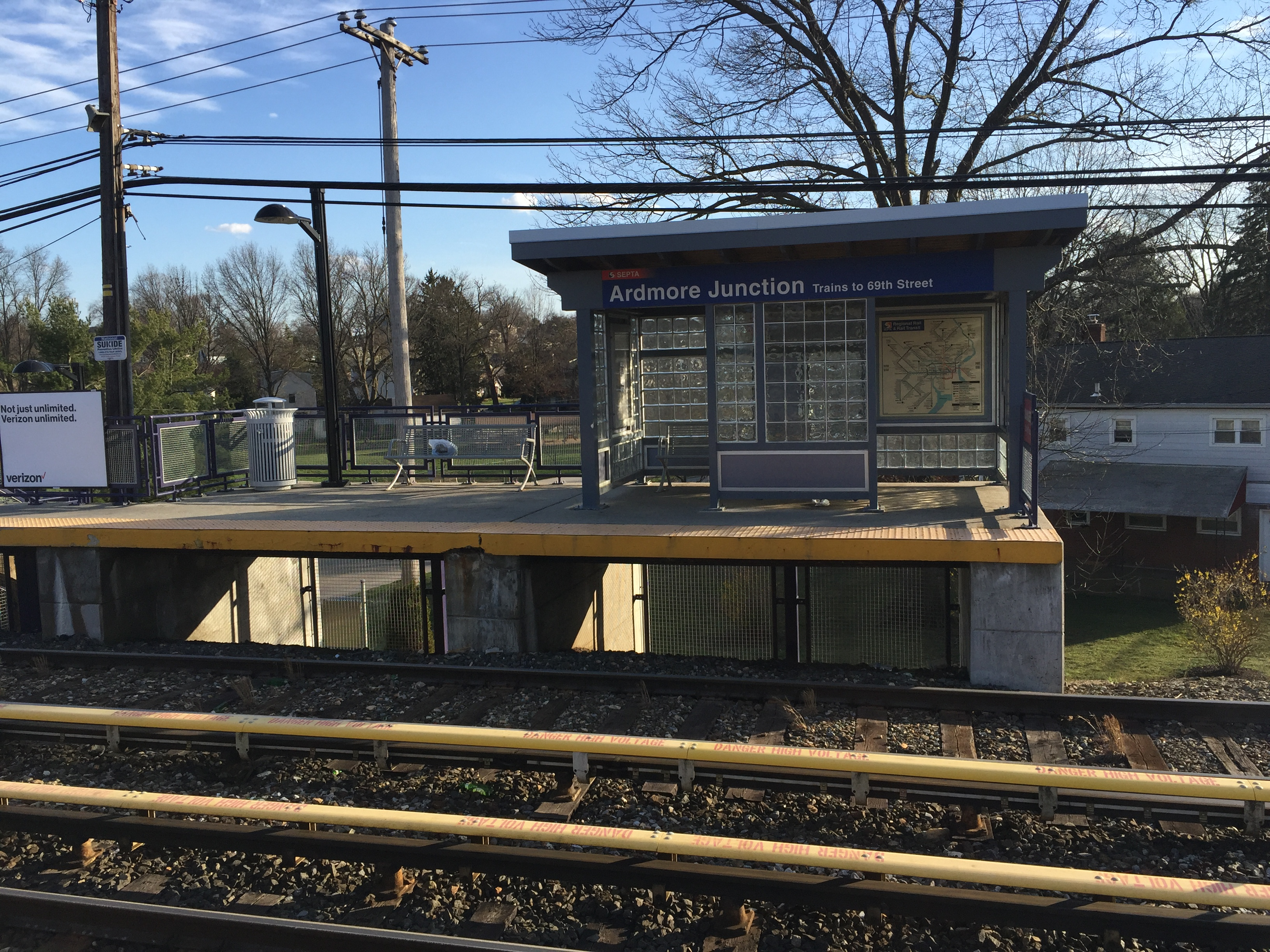
- Ardmore Junction station in 2017

General information
- Location: Hathaway Lane & Haverford Road; Ardmore, Pennsylvania
- Coordinates: 39.9962°N 75.3035°W
- Owner: SEPTA
- Platforms: 2 side platforms
- Tracks: 2
- Connections: SEPTA Suburban Bus: 103

Construction
- Parking: Yes
- Accessible: No

History
- Electrified: Third rail

Services
Preceding station	SEPTA Metro	Following station
Ardmore Avenue toward Norristown T.C.	M (SEPTA Metro)	Wynnewood Road toward 69th Street T.C.
Former services
Preceding station	Lehigh Valley Transit Company	Following station
Ardmore Avenue toward Allentown	Liberty Bell High Speed Line Until 1951	Wynnewood Road toward 69th Street
Preceding station	Philadelphia and Western Railroad	Following station
Ardmore Avenue toward Strafford	Strafford Branch Until 1956	Wynnewood Road toward 69th Street
Location

Ardmore Junction station is a SEPTA Metro transit station in Havertown, Pennsylvania. It serves the M and SEPTA Route 103 bus. The trolley stop is elevated, with the bus stop below on the Ardmore Busway. Ardmore Junction and Wynnewood stations are key anchors of the Haverford Road Corridor.

The land use around the station is predominately residential with some commercial. The station serves the neighborhoods of Ardmore Park, Merwood, Oakmont and Merion Golf Manor. The SEPTA private busway, used by the 103 bus, is notable for being the first private busway in the United States. The busway is an important pedestrian and active mobility link to the Oakmont neighborhood.

== History ==
The Philadelphia and Western Railroad began stopping at this transit location in 1907 as part of the railroad's plans to connect Philadelphia with Parkesburg. The 103 bus right of way was once part of the Ardmore branch of the Red Arrow Lines trolleys, but it was paved to make way for buses when the trolley line was discontinued in 1966. The Norristown Line bridge was rebuilt around 1992 during system-wide renovations.

=== In popular culture ===
This Philadelphia-area band Ardmore Junction, whose 1990s theme song was "High Speed Line," was named after the Ardmore Junction station—the station traveled to by guitarist Dan Mason to connect with fellow band member Kevin Shober.

== Gallery ==
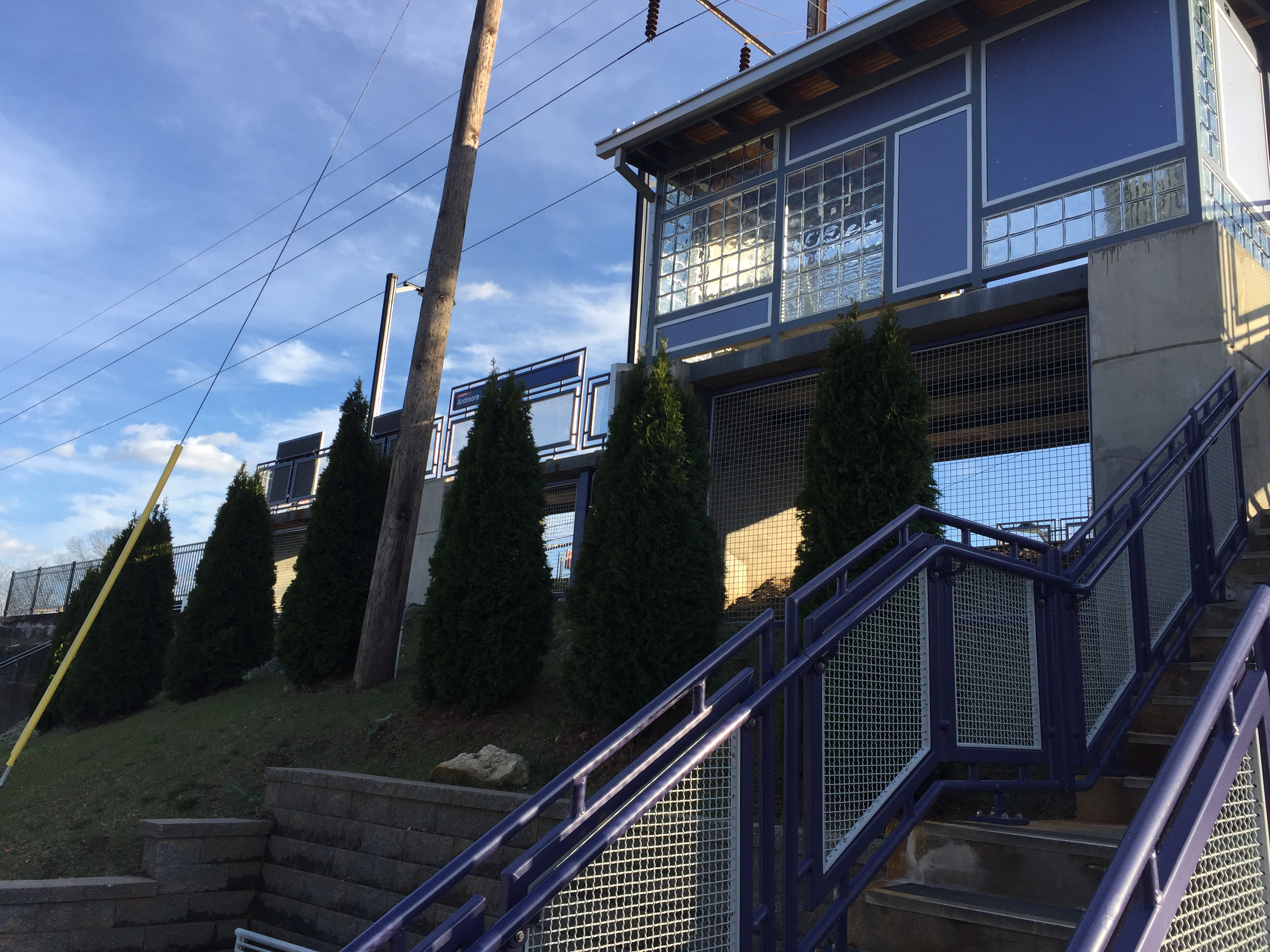
Ardmore Junction station

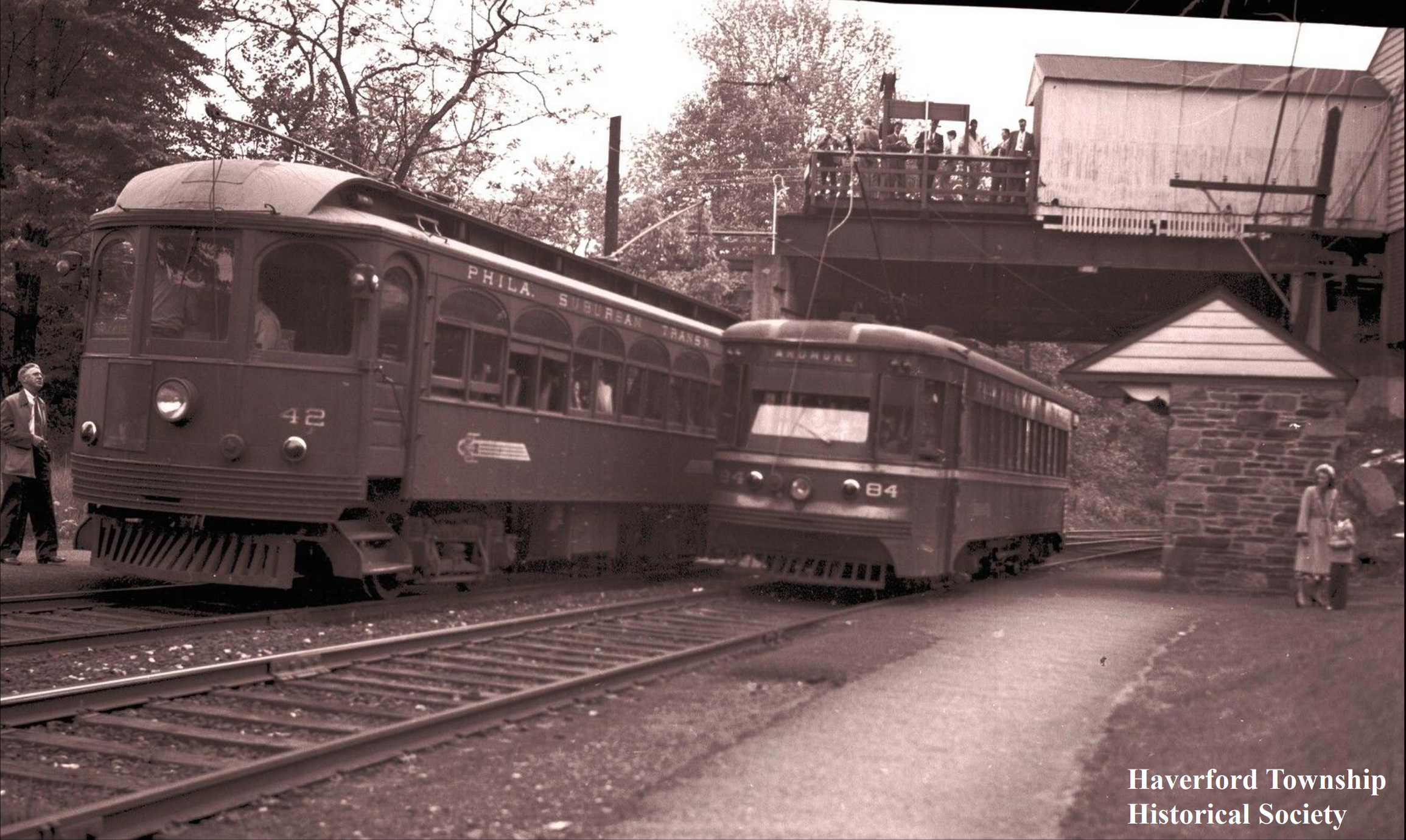
Ardmore Junction Station when Route 103 was a Trolley
