= Roberts Road station =

Rapid transit station in Pennsylvania

Roberts Rd
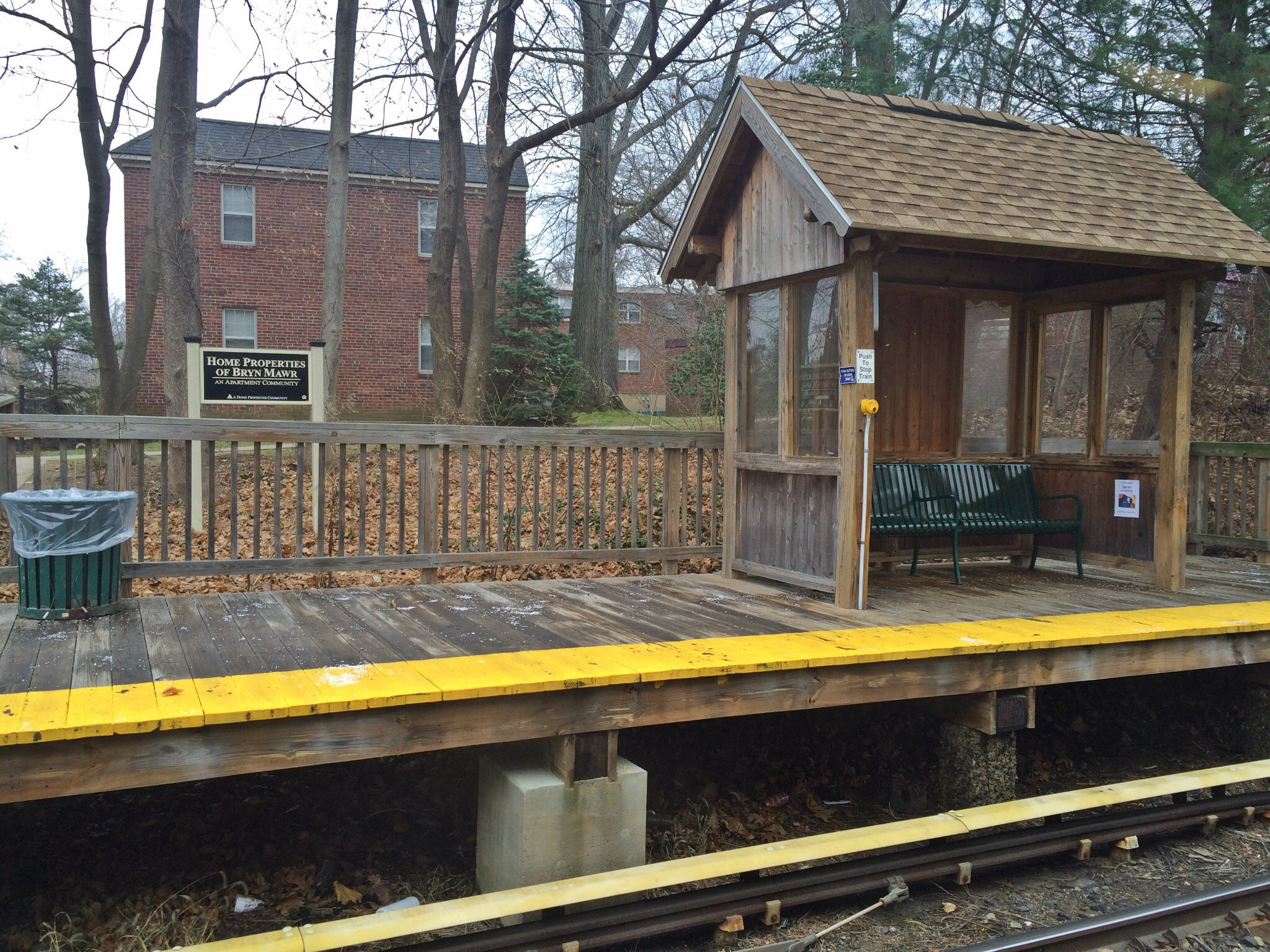

General information
- Location: Roberts Road and David Drive; Rosemont, Pennsylvania
- Coordinates: 40.0214°N 75.3304°W
- Owner: SEPTA
- Platforms: 2 side platforms
- Tracks: 2

Construction
- Accessible: No

History
- Opened: 1907
- Electrified: Third rail
- Former names: Rosemont Road (1907–2010)

Services
Preceding station	SEPTA Metro	Following station
Garrett Hill toward Norristown T.C.	M (SEPTA Metro)	Bryn Mawr toward 69th Street T.C.
Former services
Preceding station	Lehigh Valley Transit Company	Following station
Garrett Hill toward Allentown	Liberty Bell High Speed Line Until 1951	Bryn Mawr toward 69th Street
Preceding station	Philadelphia and Western Railroad	Following station
Garrett Hill toward Strafford	Strafford Branch Until 1956	Bryn Mawr toward 69th Street
Location

Roberts Road station is a SEPTA Metro rapid transit station in Rosemont, Pennsylvania. It serves the M and is located at Roberts Road and David Drive in Radnor Township, Pennsylvania. All trains stop at Roberts Road. The station lies 5.9 track miles (9.5 km) from 69th Street Transit Center.

== History ==
The Rosemont station of the Philadelphia and Western Railroad opened in 1907. On July 19 of that same year, railroad foreman John McNally was struck and killed by a train while he was crossing the tracks.

During the 1920s, proximity to the Rosemont station was a selling point for area realtors. On January 22, 1926, several people were injured when an electric train operated by the Pennsylvania Railroad struck the rear of a westbound express train at the Rosemont station.

The station was renamed from Rosemont to Roberts Road by SEPTA on September 5, 2010.

== Gallery ==
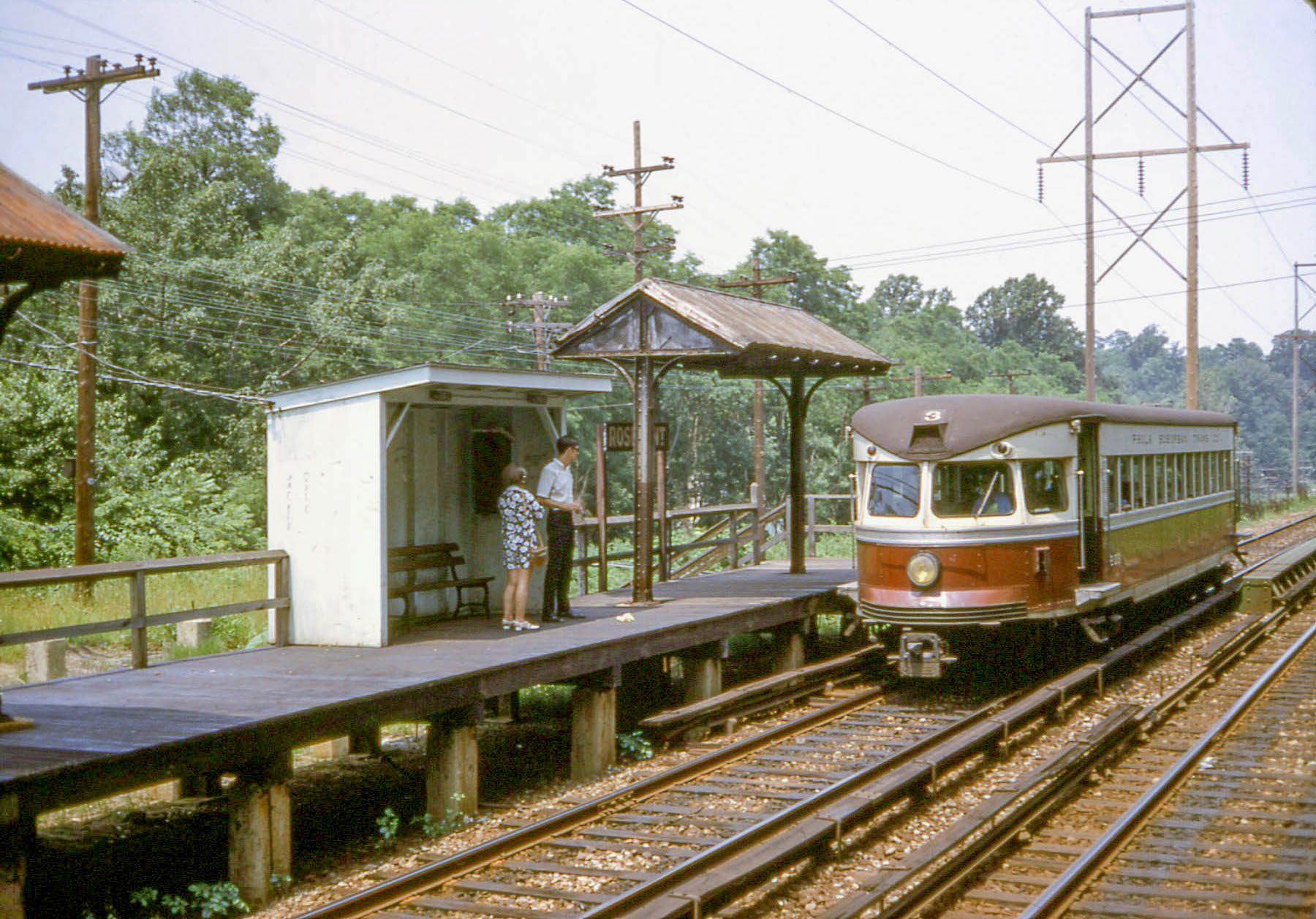
Brill "Bullet" car 203 arriving at the station in 1968
