= Haverford station =

Haverford station may refer to:

- Haverford station (Norristown High Speed Line)
- Haverford station (SEPTA Regional Rail)
