= Stadium station (SEPTA) =

Rapid transit station in Pennsylvania

Stadium
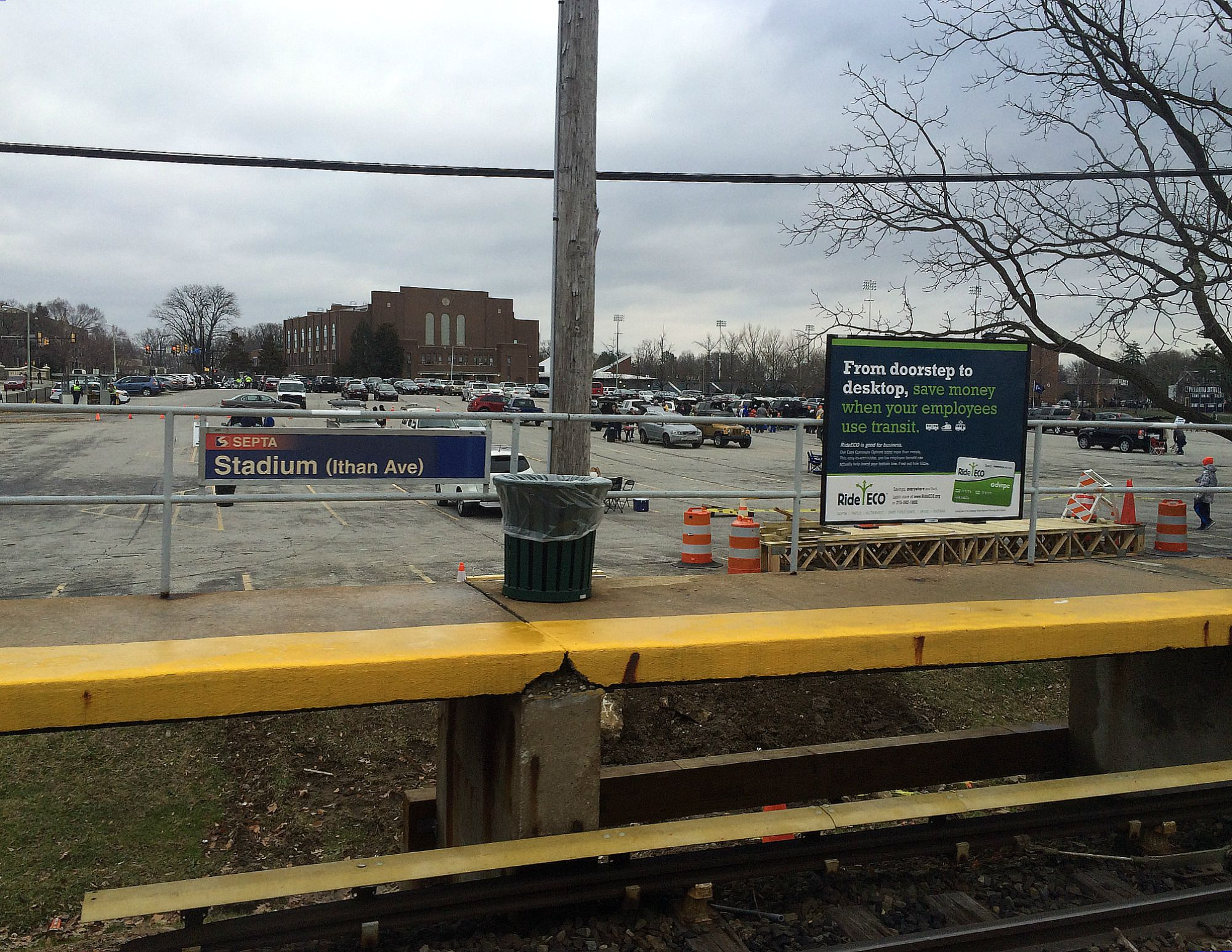

General information
- Location: Ithan Avenue between Lancaster Avenue and Aldwyn Lane; Radnor Township, Pennsylvania
- Coordinates: 40.0327°N 75.3409°W
- Owner: SEPTA
- Platforms: 2 side platforms
- Tracks: 2

Construction
- Platform levels: 2
- Parking: Unavailable
- Accessible: Yes

History
- Electrified: Third rail
- Former names: Stadium–Ithan Avenue (2010–2025)

Services
Preceding station	SEPTA Metro	Following station
Villanova toward Norristown T.C.	M (SEPTA Metro)	Garrett Hill toward 69th Street T.C.
Former services
Preceding station	Lehigh Valley Transit Company	Following station
Villanova toward Allentown	Liberty Bell High Speed Line Until 1951	Garrett Hill toward 69th Street
Preceding station	Philadelphia and Western Railroad	Following station
Villanova toward Strafford	Strafford Branch Until 1956	Garrett Hill toward 69th Street
Location

Stadium station is a SEPTA Metro rapid transit station in Radnor Township, Pennsylvania. It serves the M and is located on Ithan Avenue near Lancaster Avenue (US 30), near Villanova Stadium, the athletic facility for nearby Villanova University. All trains stop at Stadium. The station lies 6.8 track miles (10.9 km) from 69th Street Transit Center.
