= Bryn Mawr South station =

SEPTA Metro station in Radnor Township, Pennsylvania

Bryn Mawr South
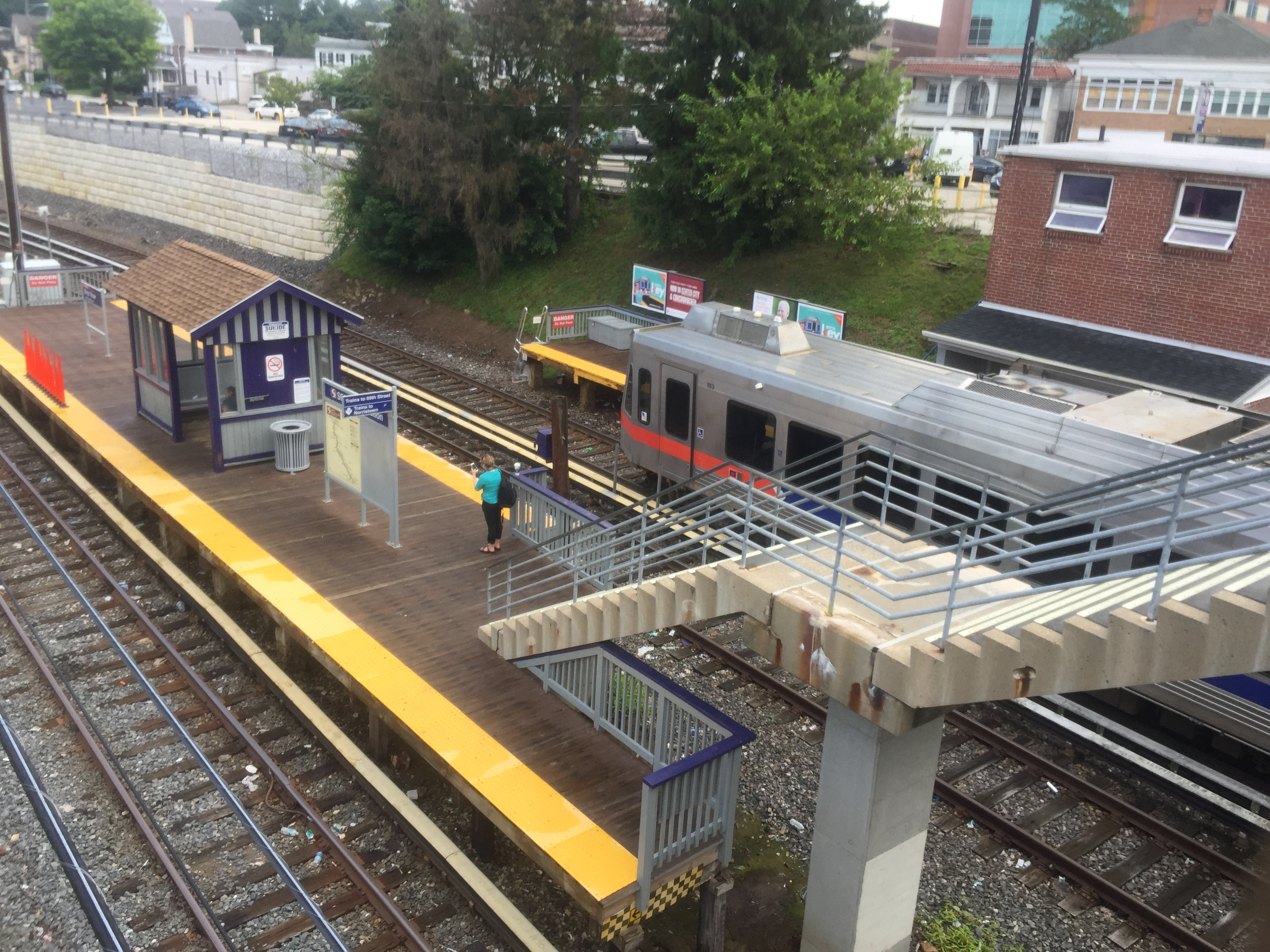
- Station platform in 2018

General information
- Location: Glenbrook Avenue and County Line Road; Radnor Township, Pennsylvania
- Coordinates: 40.0180°N 75.3232°W
- Owner: SEPTA
- Platforms: 1 side platform, 1 island platform
- Tracks: 3

Construction
- Parking: Yes
- Accessible: No

History
- Opened: 1907
- Electrified: Third rail

Services
Preceding station	SEPTA Metro	Following station
Roberts Road toward Norristown T.C.	M (SEPTA Metro)	Haverford South toward 69th Street T.C.
Former services
Preceding station	Lehigh Valley Transit Company	Following station
Rosemont toward Allentown	Liberty Bell High Speed Line Until 1951	Haverford South toward 69th Street
Preceding station	Philadelphia and Western Railroad	Following station
Rosemont toward Strafford	Strafford Branch Until 1956	Haverford South toward 69th Street
Location

Bryn Mawr South station (formerly known as Bryn Mawr Station) is a SEPTA Metro rapid transit station in Radnor Township, Pennsylvania. It serves the M and is located at Glenbrook Avenue and County Line Road, although SEPTA gives the location as being at Bryn Mawr Avenue and Brook Street. All trains stop at Bryn Mawr South. The station lies near Bryn Mawr Hospital. The station lies 5.4 track miles (8.7 km) from 69th Street Transit Center. The station has off-street parking available.

== Gallery ==
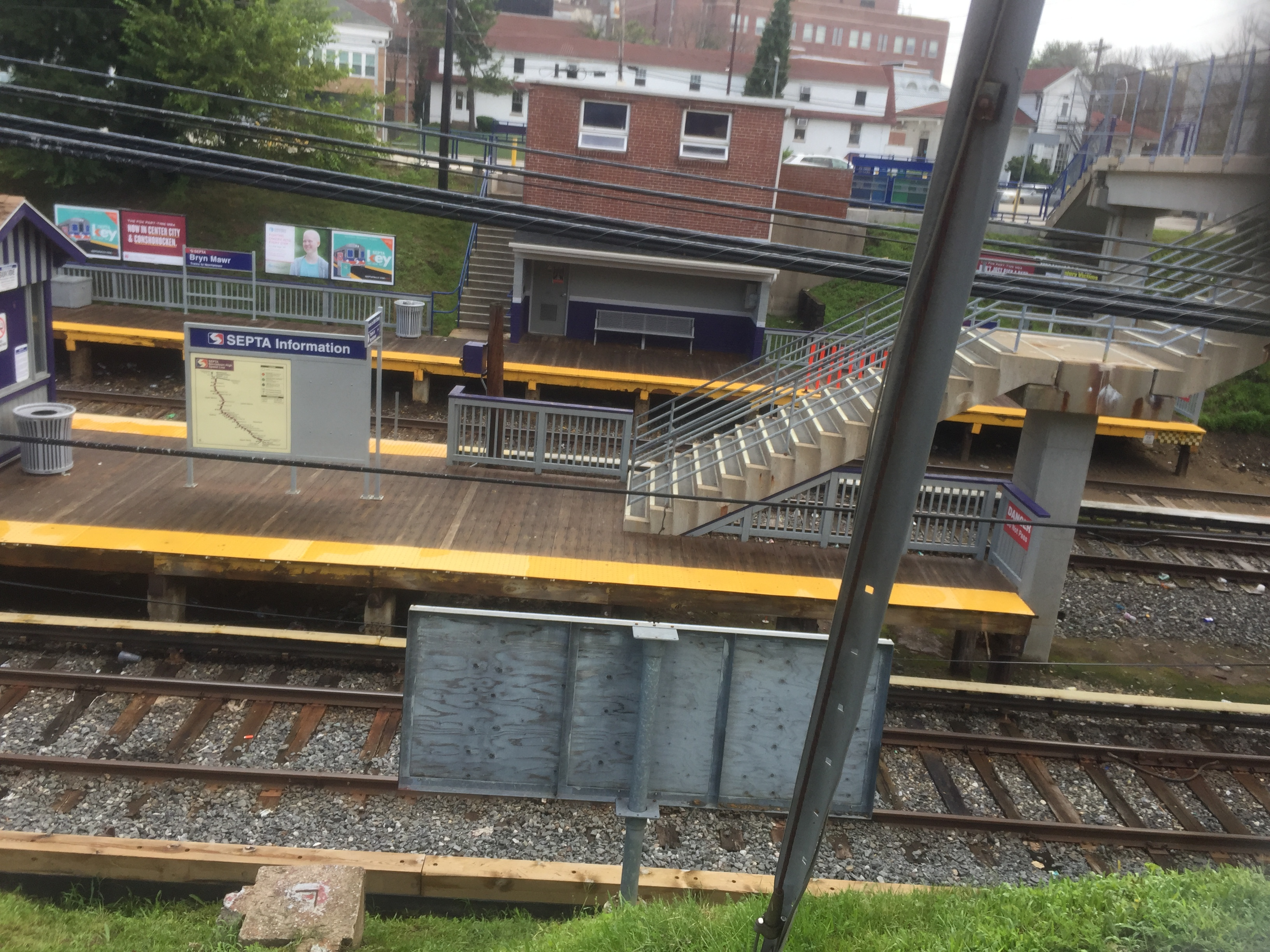
Station signage

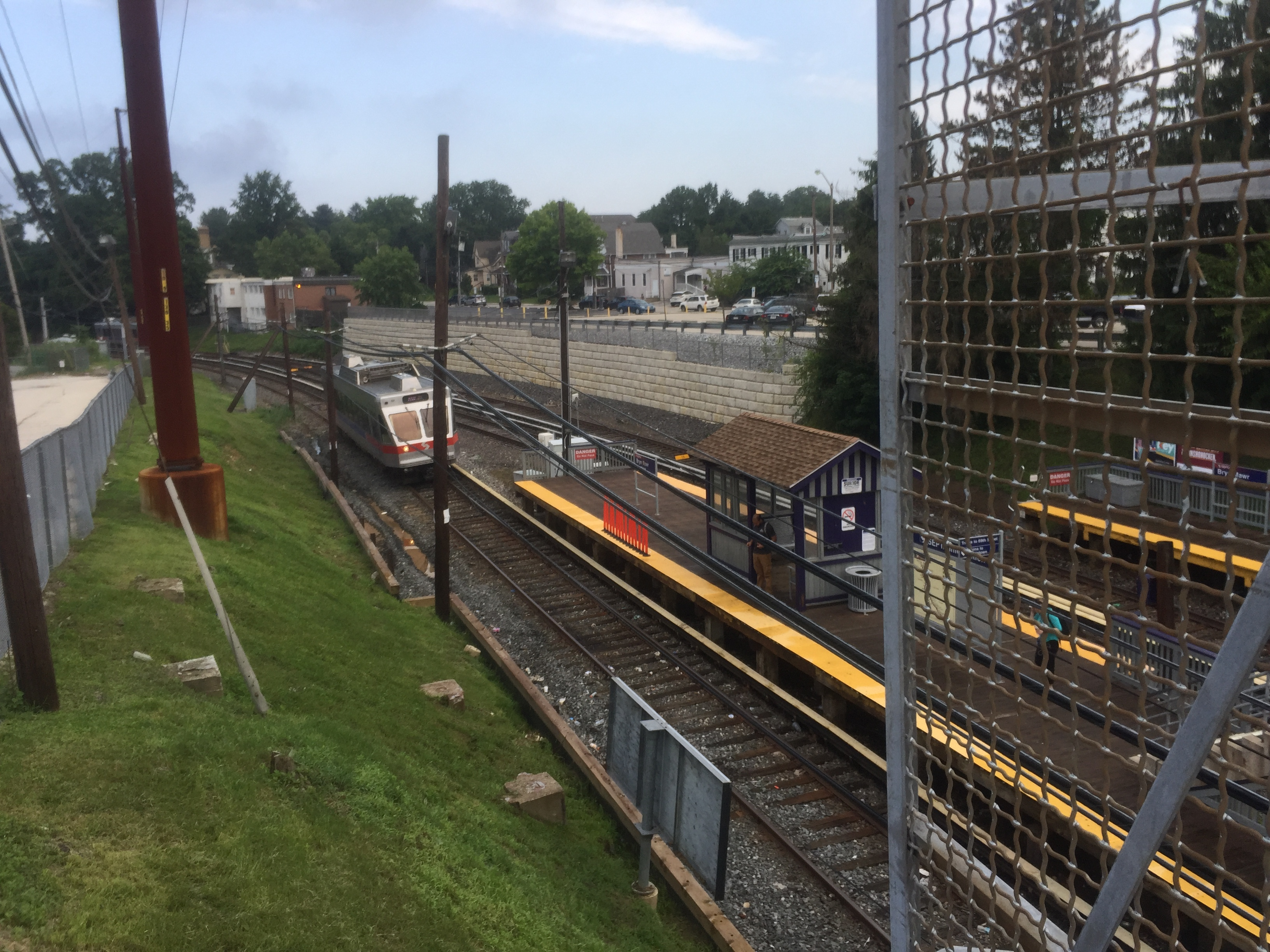
Southbound train

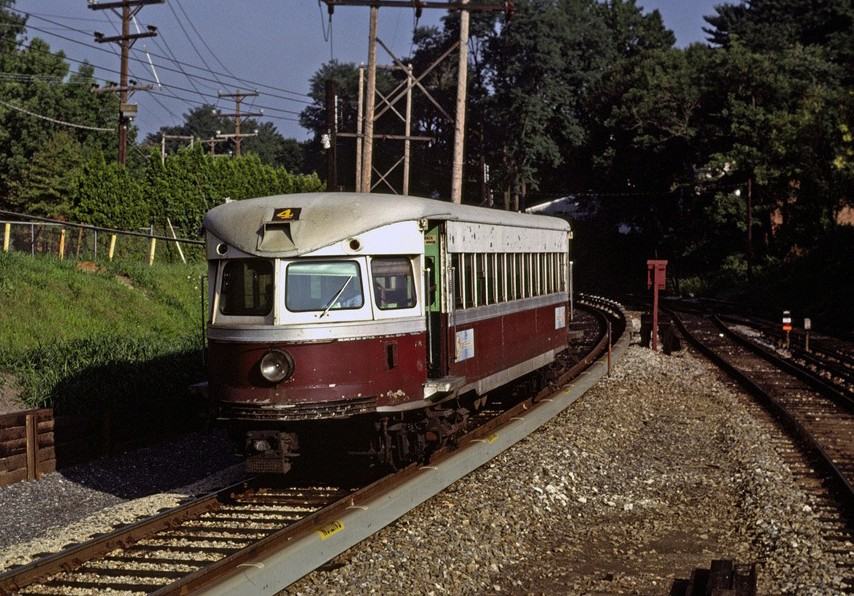
Former P&W/PSTC Brill "Bullet" car #4 at Byrn Mawr station, in August 1980.
