= Garrett Hill, Pennsylvania =

Unincorporated community in Pennsylvania, US

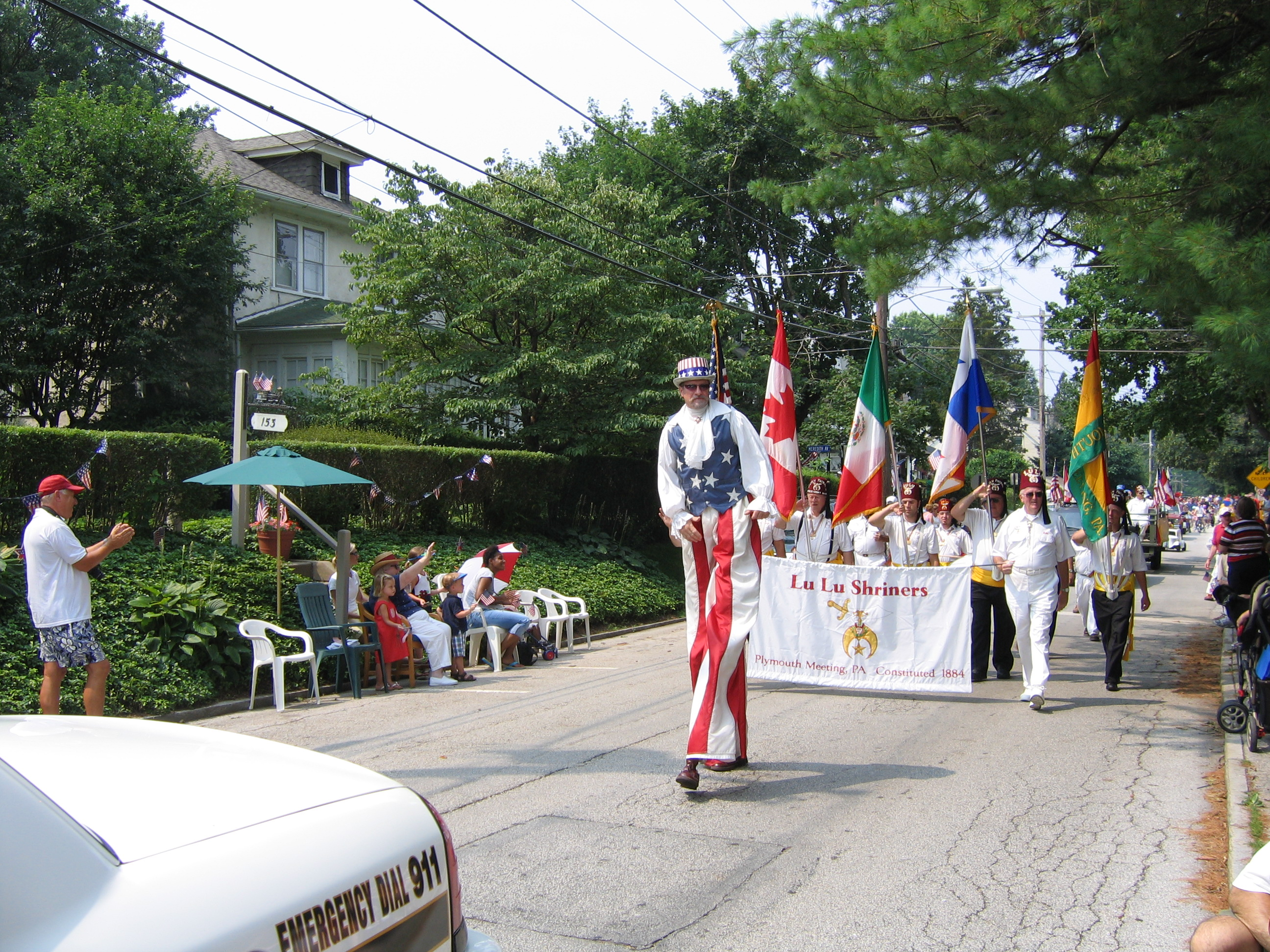
- Annual 4th of July Parade: Lowrys Lane

- Location of Garrett Hill in Pennsylvania Garrett Hill, Pennsylvania (the United States)
- Coordinates: 40°01′37″N 75°20′15″W
- Country: United States
- State: Pennsylvania
- County: Delaware
- Township: Radnor
- Elevation: 433 ft (132 m)
- Time zone: UTC-5 (EST)
  - Summer (DST): UTC-4 (EDT)
- Area code: 610

Garrett Hill is an unincorporated community in Radnor Township, Delaware County, Pennsylvania, United States, located approximately eight miles northwest of Philadelphia. The geographic area is located in the portion of the Bryn Mawr ZIP code that comprises Rosemont. The community is roughly bounded by Lancaster Avenue, Lewis Lane, Garrett Avenue and Lowrys Lane, with Conestoga Road acting as the central arterial Road. Although a predominantly working class community once with blue collared roots, it is located on the Pennsylvania Railroad Main Line.

The community is served by its own stop, Garrett Hill station, on the Norristown High Speed Line, formerly the Philadelphia and Western Railway.

Garrett Hill is mainly a residential community, but also includes a small commercial area (near the intersection of Conestoga Road and Garrett Avenue) consisting of a few bars and other small businesses that serve the community and the student population of nearby Villanova University.

One of Garrett Hill's traditions is an annual community Fourth of July parade, followed by a free picnic with live music and other entertainment in Clem Macrone Park.

Garrett Hill's housing stock consists largely of late 19th-century and early-to-mid 20th-century structures, including Victorian, single-family frame and brick duplex homes.

== History ==
The 253 acres that make up the heart of present-day Garrett Hill were originally settled by the family of David James and Margaret Mortimer of Llandegley and Glascwm Parises of Radnorshire, Wales who arrived in Pennsylvania on October 28, 1682 on board the sailing ship Bristol Factor that was captained by Roger Drew. The Bristol Factor was one of approximately 32 vessels chartered by William Penn between 1681 and 1684, to ferry the Welsh Quakers from various parts of Wales across the Atlantic Ocean to Pennsylvania for the purpose of establishing a Welsh Barony for Sir William Penn.

In 1682, Garrett Hill lay in the heart of what was then known as The Welsh Tract. Radnor Township acquired its name because many of the settlers, such as the James family, had come directly from Radnorshire, Wales.

When the James family arrived in the fall of 1682, they proceeded to present day Garrett Hill using dead reckoning, for the area at that time was still wilderness. David James had acquired "rights" to 100 acres where Garrett Hill stands today when he purchased an "indenture" to land in Welshpoole, Wales in the summer of 1682. The James family were literally the first inhabitants of Garrett Hill. They spent their first winter, 1682-1683, living in a cave near present-day Radnor United Methodist Church.

In 1718, the James family acquired the rights to an additional 153 acres of Garrett Hill from David Meredith who, although not having previously occupied the land, had been declared lord over the land in 1708 by William Penn's land commissioners. 1n 1739, David James, the founder of Garrett Hill died and was buried in the cemetery that surrounds the Great Valley Baptist Church in Devon. His tombstone can be found there today.

In 1776, two of David James' grandsons, Daniel James and Elias James, would serve on the Continental Line under General George Washington in the American Revolution. In 1777, Evan James would serve as a lieutenant in the 2nd Battalion, Chester County Pennsylvania Militia under the commanded of Colonel Evan Evans. During the Revolutionary War, the James Family Plantation was raided and occupied by the British Army, stripping the family farm of all its assets including food, livestock and household supplies as punishment for the family's service to the rebels. Following the war, the James family would receive a five-year tax amnesty for their service to the new nation.

In 1780, local Methodists began meeting and studying at the James family plantation home, called the Old James Mansion. In 1783 David James' son, Evan James, would donate a half-acre of land memorializing where the family landed in 1682 to the Radnor United Methodist Church. Thereafter, the area acquired the name "Methodist Hill." Prior to that the area had been known as "James Hill."

Not until the advent of the stone quarry and brickyard did Garrett Hill acquire the name by which it is known today. Once the area was industrialized, a community sprang up, consisting of residences for workers in proximity to the nearby stone quarry and brickyard (now both disappeared). The residents also worked at the estates, which were common in the area.

== Notable person ==
- Emlen Tunnell, the first African-American inducted into the Professional Football Hall of Fame
