= Garrett Hill station =

Rapid transit station in Pennsylvania

Garrett Hill
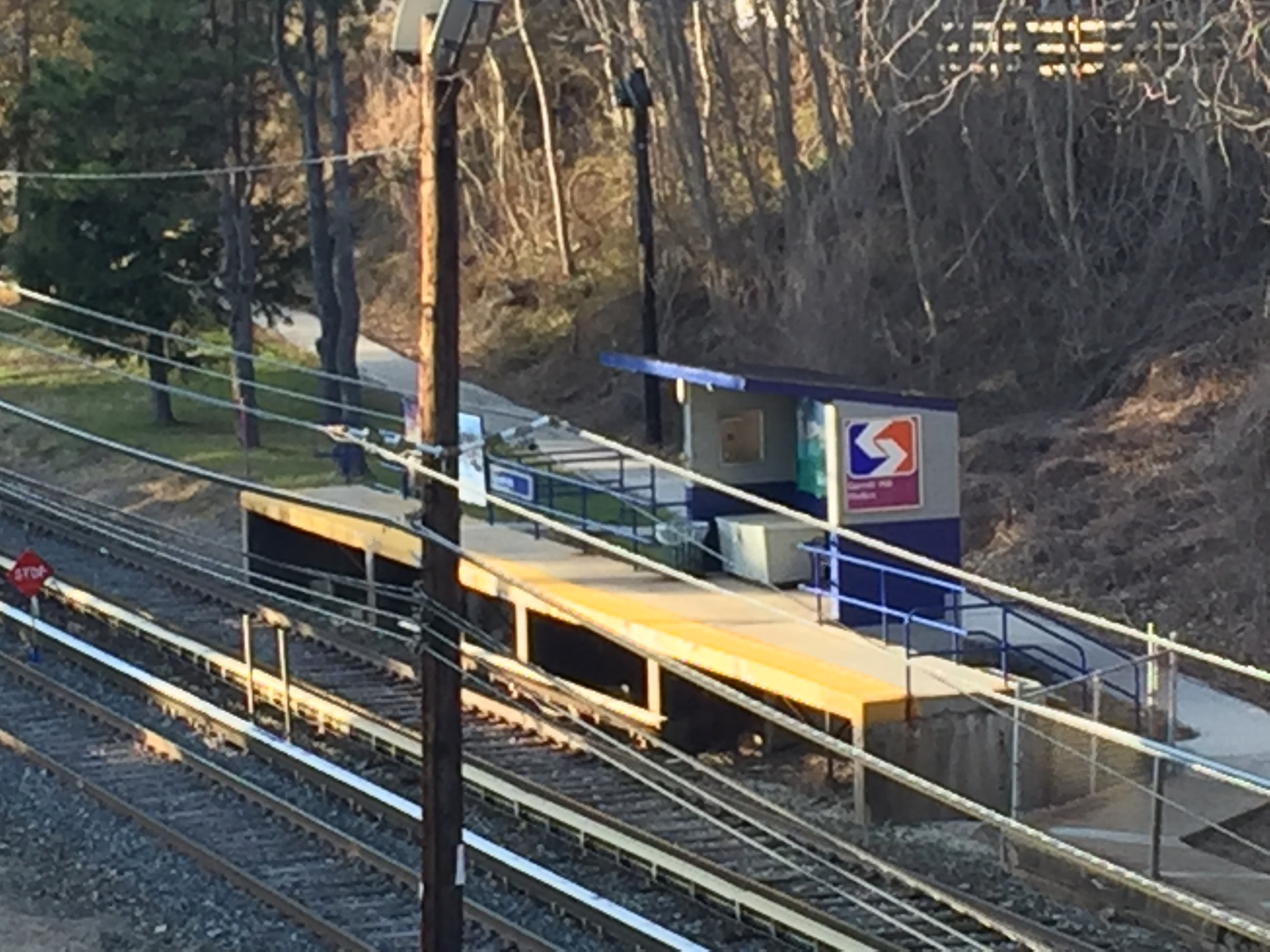
- Garrett Hill station 2017

General information
- Location: Garrett Avenue and Lowry's Lane, near Lancaster Avenue; Garrett Hill, Pennsylvania
- Coordinates: 40.0279°N 75.3364°W
- Owner: SEPTA
- Platforms: 2 side platforms
- Tracks: 2

Construction
- Accessible: No

History
- Opened: 1907
- Electrified: Third rail

Services
Preceding station	SEPTA Metro	Following station
Stadium toward Norristown T.C.	M (SEPTA Metro)	Roberts Road toward 69th Street T.C.
Former services
Preceding station	Lehigh Valley Transit Company	Following station
Stadium–Ithan Avenue toward Allentown	Liberty Bell High Speed Line Until 1951	Rosemont toward 69th Street
Preceding station	Philadelphia and Western Railroad	Following station
Stadium–Ithan Avenue toward Strafford	Strafford Branch Until 1956	Rosemont toward 69th Street
Location

Garrett Hill station is a SEPTA Metro rapid transit station in the community of Garrett Hill, in Radnor Township, Pennsylvania. It serves the M and is located between Garrett Avenue and Lowry's Lane, near Lancaster Avenue (US 30) in Radnor Township, although SEPTA gives the address as being near "Lowerys" Lane & Fairfax Road. All trains stop at Garrett Hill. The station lies 6.4 track miles (10.3 km) from 69th Street Transit Center.
