= Ardmore Avenue station =

Rapid transit station in Pennsylvania

Ardmore Av
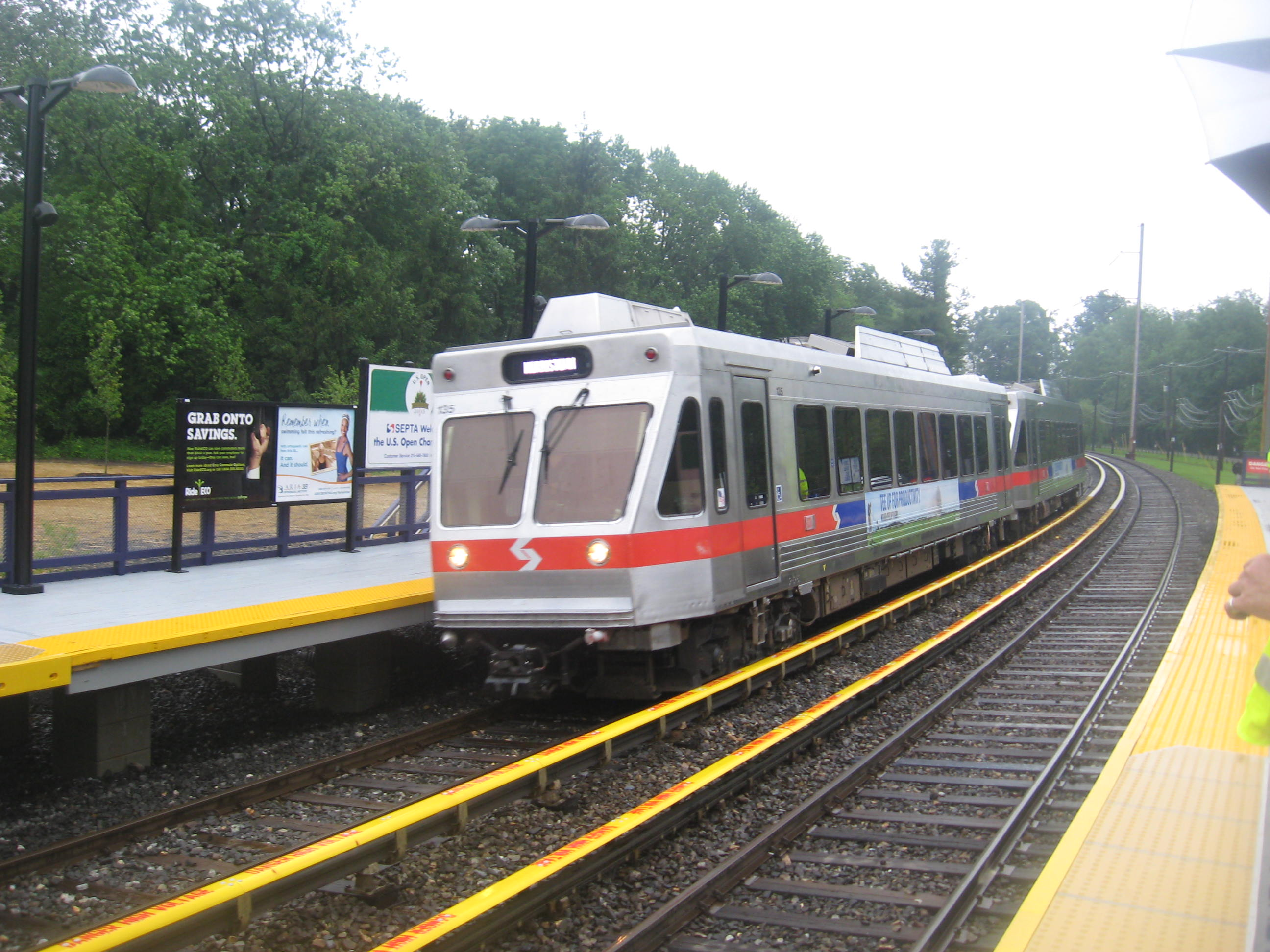
- An M car approaches Ardmore Avenue station during the 2013 U.S. Open at nearby Merion Golf Club

General information
- Location: Near Ardmore Avenue & Haverford Road; Ardmore, Pennsylvania
- Coordinates: 40°00′00″N 75°18′34″W
- Owner: SEPTA
- Platforms: 2 side platforms
- Tracks: 2
- Connections: SEPTA Suburban Bus: 103

Construction
- Parking: 37 spaces
- Cycle facilities: 8 rack spaces
- Accessible: No

History
- Opened: 1907
- Former names: Ardmore

Services
Preceding station	SEPTA Metro	Following station
Haverford toward Norristown T.C.	M (SEPTA Metro)	Ardmore Junction toward 69th Street T.C.
Former services
Preceding station	Lehigh Valley Transit Company	Following station
Haverford toward Allentown	Liberty Bell High Speed Line Until 1951	Ardmore Junction toward 69th Street
Preceding station	Philadelphia and Western Railroad	Following station
Haverford toward Strafford	Strafford Branch Until 1956	Ardmore Junction toward 69th Street
Location

Ardmore Avenue station is a SEPTA Metro rapid transit station in Ardmore, Pennsylvania. It serves the M, and is located at Ardmore Avenue and Haverford Road. All trains stop at Ardmore Avenue. The station lies 3.9 track miles (6.3 km) from 69th Street Transit Center. The station has off-street parking available.

== History ==
The Ardmore station of the Philadelphia and Western Railroad opened in 1907.
