= Haverford South station =

SEPTA Metro station in Haverford Township, Pennsylvania

Haverford South
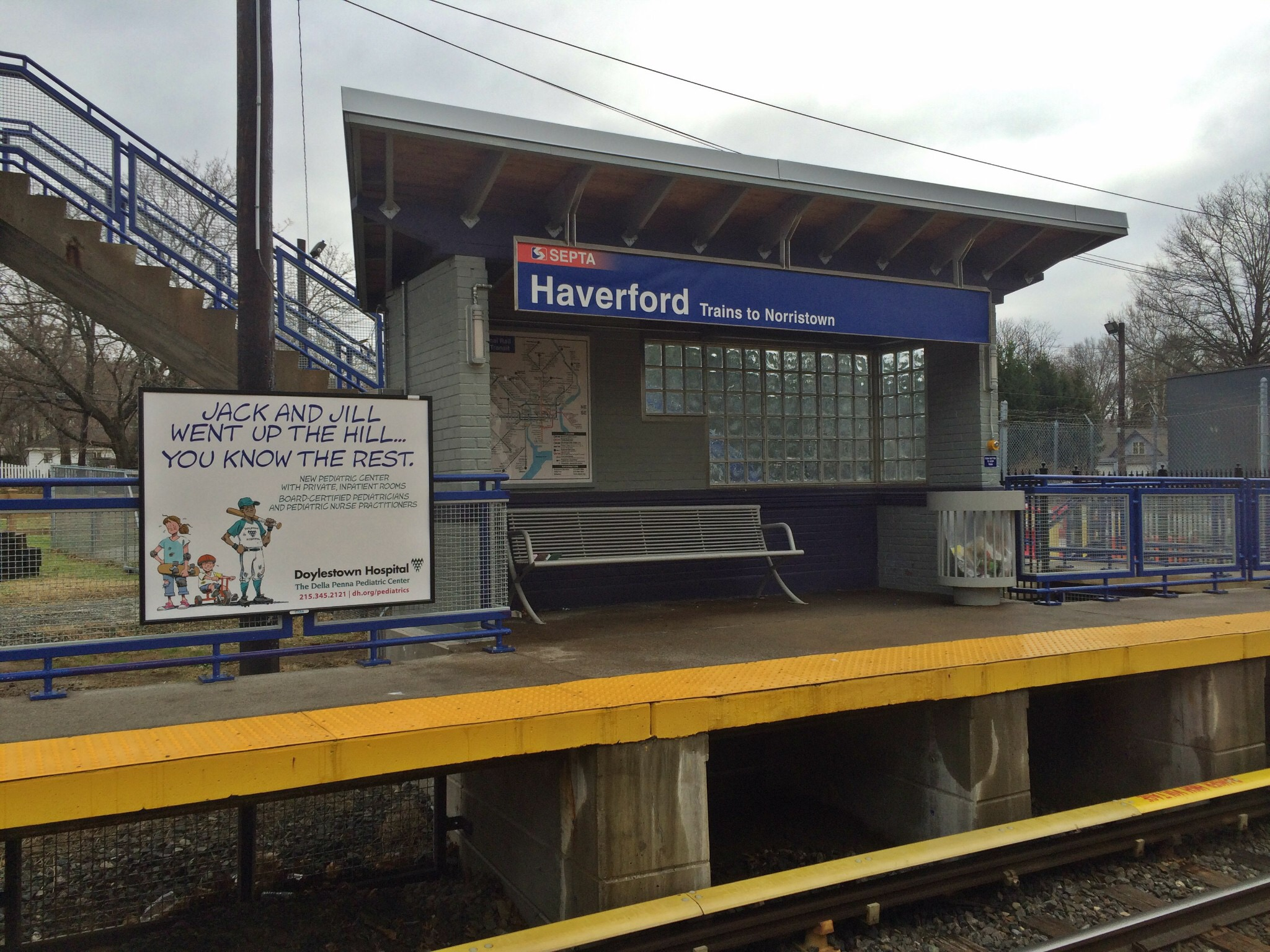

General information
- Location: Near Haverford Road & Buck Lane; Haverford Township, Pennsylvania
- Coordinates: 40.0100°N 75.3152°W
- Owner: SEPTA
- Platforms: 2 side platforms
- Tracks: 2

Construction
- Parking: Yes
- Accessible: No

History
- Opened: 1907
- Electrified: Third rail

Services
Preceding station	SEPTA Metro	Following station
Bryn Mawr toward Norristown T.C.	M (SEPTA Metro)	Ardmore Avenue toward 69th Street T.C.
Former services
Preceding station	Lehigh Valley Transit Company	Following station
Bryn Mawr South toward Allentown	Liberty Bell High Speed Line Until 1951	Ardmore Avenue toward 69th Street
Preceding station	Philadelphia and Western Railroad	Following station
Bryn Mawr South toward Strafford	Strafford Branch Until 1956	Ardmore Avenue toward 69th Street
Location

Haverford South station (formerly known as Haverford station) is a SEPTA Metro rapid transit station in Haverford Township, Pennsylvania. It serves the M and is located at Haverford Road and Buck Lane. All trains stop at Haverford. The station lies near the campus of Haverford College and the Haverford School. The station lies 4.5 track miles (7.2 km) from 69th Street Transit Center. The station has off-street parking available.
