= Villanova Stadium =

Building in Pennsylvania, USA

- Location in Radnor Township Location in Pennsylvania Location in the United States
- Location: North Ithan Avenue; Villanova, Pennsylvania, United States 19085
- Coordinates: 40°1′59″N 75°20′12″W
- Owner: Villanova University
- Operator: Villanova University
- Capacity: 12,500
- Surface: FieldTurf
- Public transit: SEPTA Metro: (Stadium); SEPTA bus: 105

Construction
- Opened: November 8, 1927; 98 years ago

Tenants
- Villanova Wildcats (NCAA) football (1927–81, 1985–present) men's lacrosse (1984–present) women's lacrosse field hockey track & field Philadelphia Charge (WUSA) (2001–2003); Philadelphia Barrage (MLL) (2004–2006); Philadelphia Waterdogs (PLL) (2024–present)

Villanova Stadium is a 12,500 seat stadium located on the campus of Villanova University in Villanova, Pennsylvania, USA.

== History ==
Villanova Stadium was originally built in 1927 and dedicated on October 8, 1927. The stadium plays host to a wide variety of events including serving as home to the Villanova Wildcats football, field hockey, lacrosse, and track and field teams. Philadelphia area teams such as the WUSA's Philadelphia Charge and Major League Lacrosse's Philadelphia Barrage have also used the stadium in the past or currently. In the 1960s, Monsignor Bonner High School, like Villanova an Augustinian school, used the field.

The field and track at Villanova Stadium are known as "Goodreau Field" and "Jumbo Elliott Track," respectively. On May 7, 1930, the playing field at Villanova Stadium was dedicated to the memory of Leo J. Francis Goodreau, a Villanova football player who died due to injuries incurred in practice. On September 27, 1980, the running track was dedicated to Villanova's legendary track and field coach James "Jumbo" Elliott.

=== Renovations ===
In Fall 1999, the stadium underwent a face-lift with the Stadium Renovation Project. Included in this project was a state of the art press box, in addition to housing an 80-person meeting room for all Villanova Athletic Department personnel to use. The former AstroTurf playing field was replaced during the spring of 2002 with a synthetic grass surface known as AstroPlay.

In Fall 2009, the stadium received a new scoreboard along with a new playing surface.

In 2016, a new football operations building, the Andrew J. Talley Athletic Center, which also serves as the training room for the sports programs at the school, opened, named for the school's first head coach since the May 1984 reinstatement of the program until the end of 2016.

== See also ==
- List of NCAA Division I FCS football stadiums

Preceded by Columbus Crew Stadium	Host of Major League Lacrosse championship weekend 2003	Succeeded by Nickerson Field
