= Radnor Trail =

Rail trail in Pennsylvania, United States

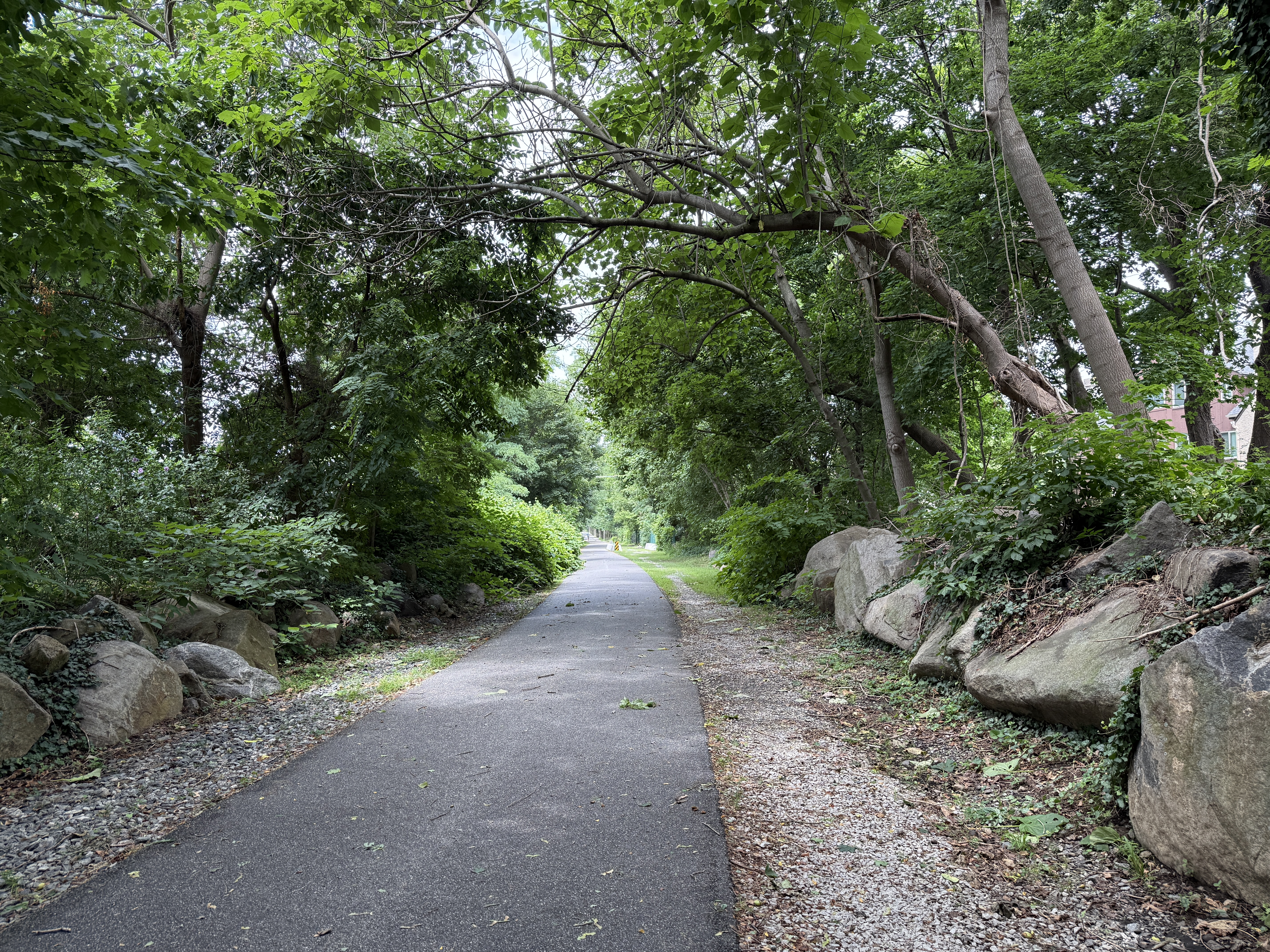
- Radnor Trail east of West Wayne Avenue
- Length: 2.4 mi (3.9 km)
- Location: Wayne, Pennsylvania
- Trailheads: Sugartown and Radnor Chester Roads
- Use: Hiking, biking, skateboarding, rollerblading, dog-walking
- Difficulty: Easy, level, ADA accessible
- Surface: Asphalt

The Radnor Trail is a 2.4-mile-long (3.9 km) rail trail that travels through Radnor Township in south-eastern Pennsylvania. The former Philadelphia & Western Railroad line is paved and has multiple entry points and parking at the Conestoga Road entry point.

== Historical development ==
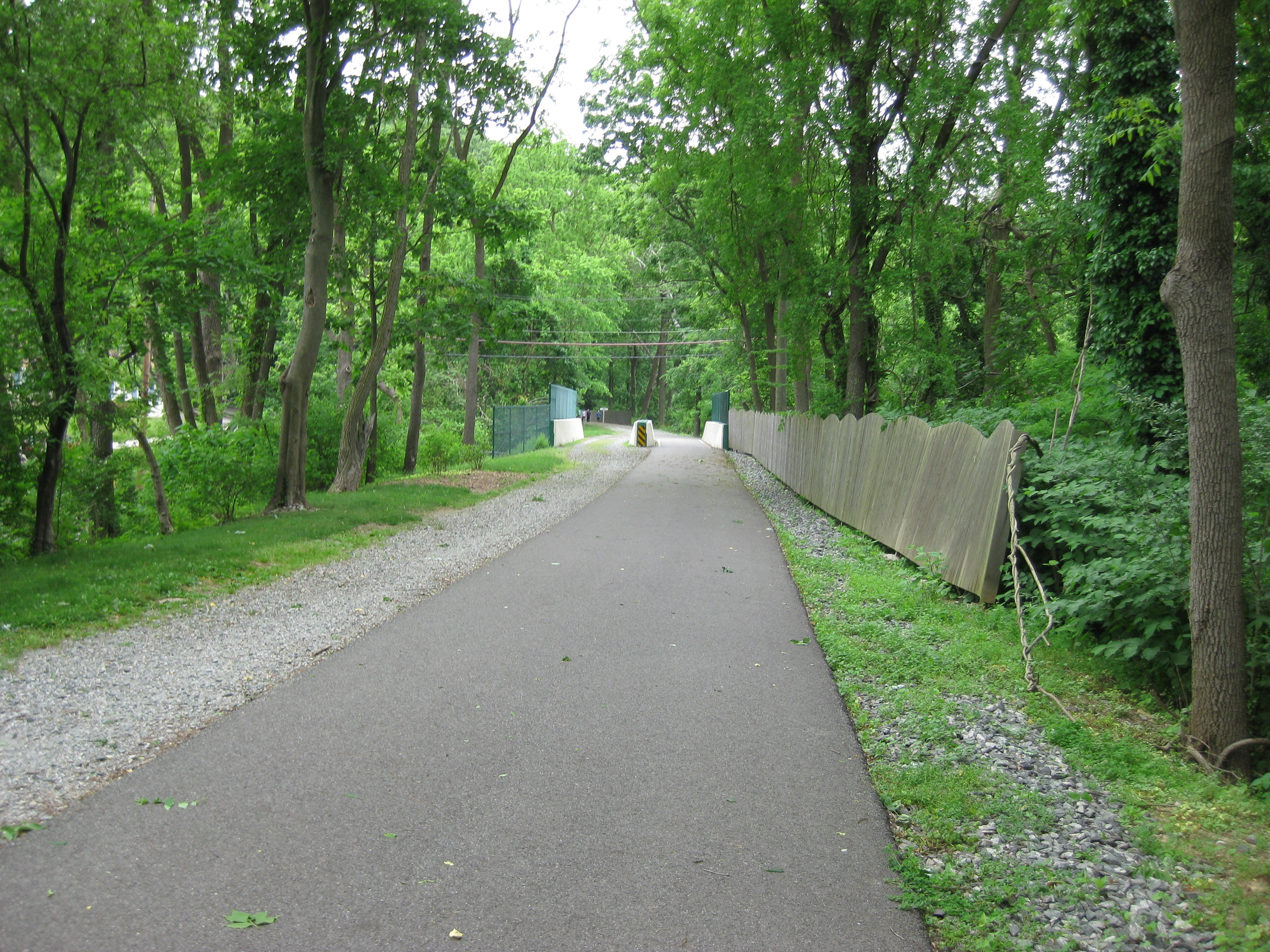
Radnor Trail entry point at Conestoga Road.

=== Historical significance ===
Created in 1902, the Radnor Trail first served as a part of the Philadelphia & Western Railway Company (P&W). The railway, developed by Jay Gould, a historic American leader in railway development, was initially planned to be a part of a grand intercontinental electric railway system. However, Gould's innovative and progressive plan was methodically scaled back, including the railway's length. At the end of completion, the railway traveled from Philadelphia's 69th Street Terminal to suburban Strafford.

=== History and evolution ===
In 1956, this section of the P&W became inactive and the route was replaced with bus transportation. (The former P&W line from 69th Street to Norristown still operates as the Norristown High-Speed Line under SEPTA). Radnor Township acquired rights to build a trail where the abandoned railway line existed. In 2005, the township celebrated the opening of the fully paved, multi-purpose trail. In August 2011, bicycle coalitions and trail advocates proposed a plan to extend and connect the Radnor Trail to existing trails. The plan has not yet been approved, but if approval is given, the trail will become a portion of a 24-mile-long (39 km) trail that runs through the Delaware, Philadelphia, and Chester counties.

== Trail development ==
=== Design and construction ===
The trail is paved and approximately ten feet wide. There is only a slight grade between Brookside Avenue and Radnor-Chester Road. The entry points are equipped with ramps allowing for wheel-chair accessibility. The trail is also lined with benches.

=== Amenities ===
There are free parking and restrooms located at the Conestoga Road entry point. There is also parking along Brookside Road and Gallagher Avenue. Dog-walking is permitted on the trail as long as they are leashed. There are dog waste bins throughout the trail where owners can dispose of garbage.

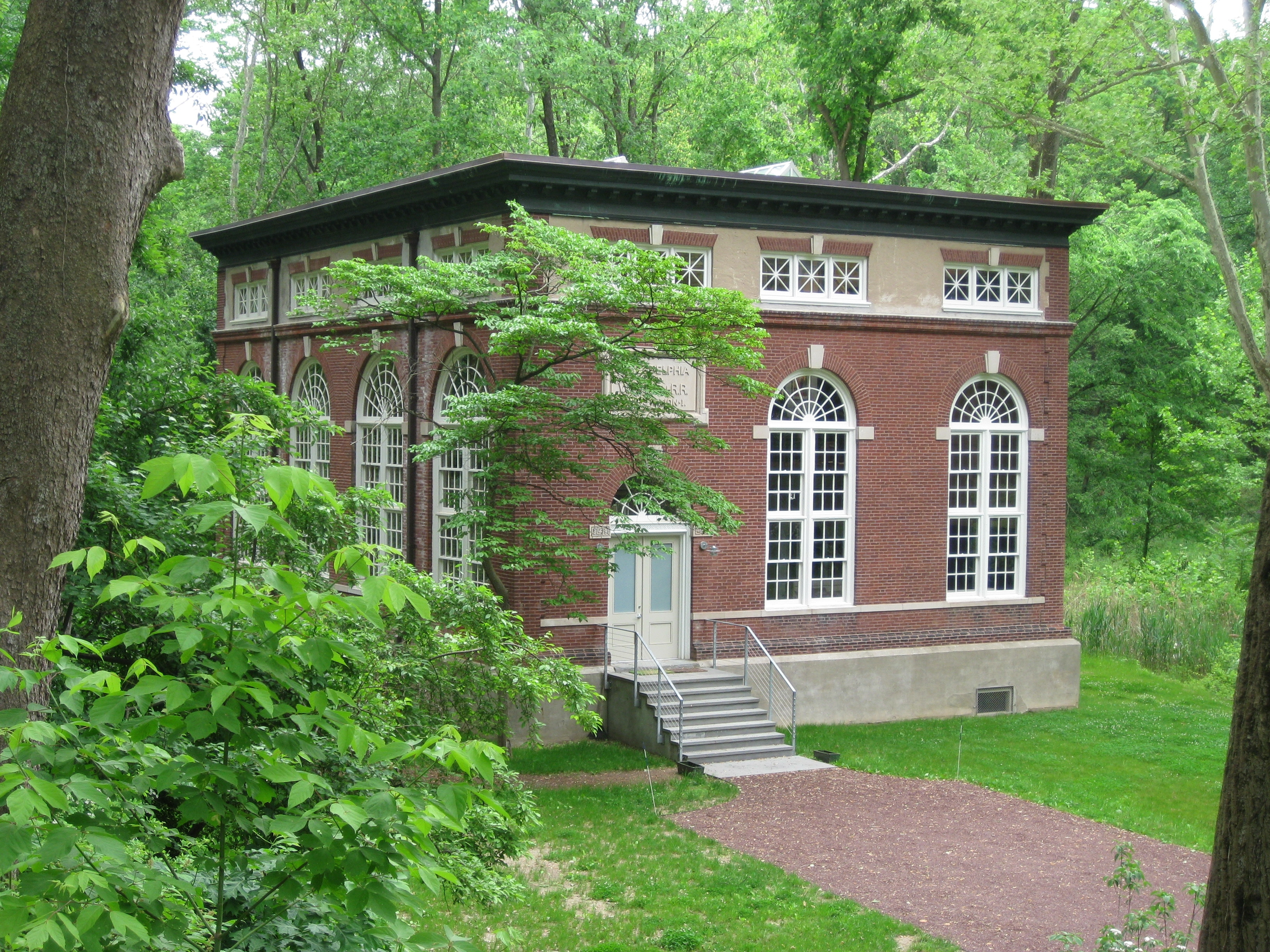
Ithan Substation No. 1 on the Radnor Trail.

== Maintenance ==
The Radnor Trail is maintained and supported by Radnor Township's Department of Parks and Recreation, along with the Radnor Historic Society.
