= Philadelphia and Western Railroad =

Former high-speed commuter interurban electric railroad

Philadelphia & Western Railway
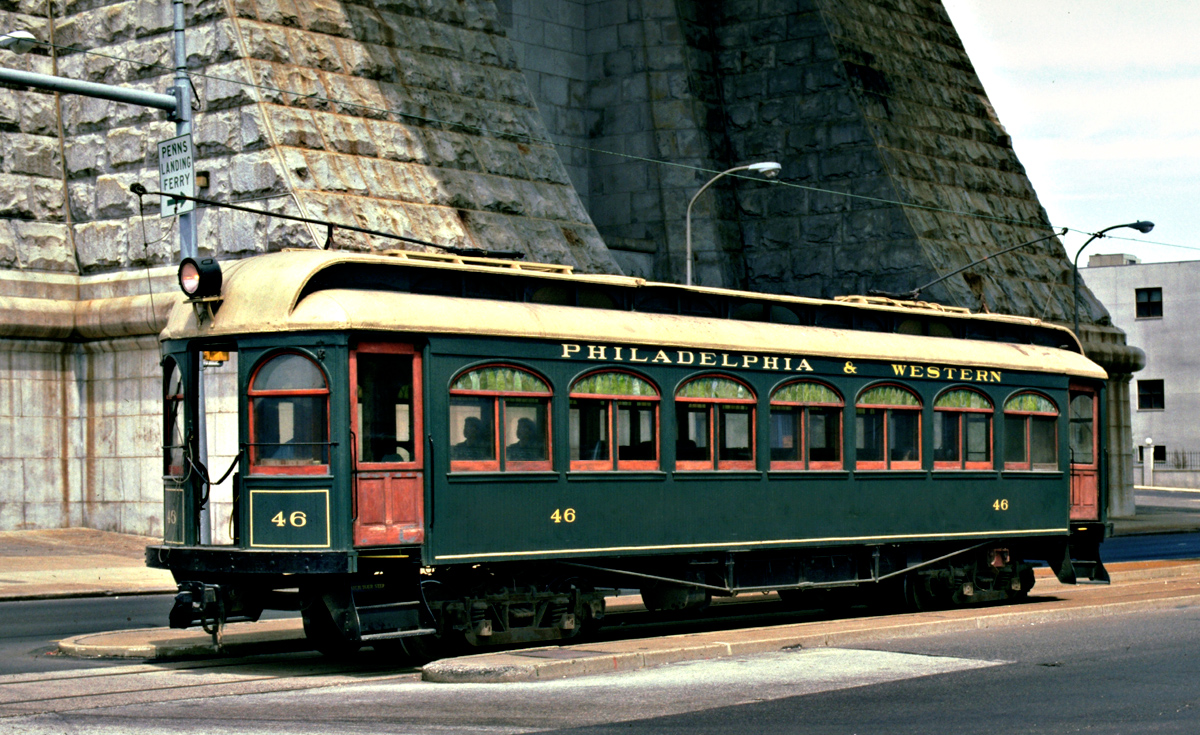
- A preserved Philadelphia and Western multiple-unit passenger car at Penn's Landing in Philadelphia in 1990

Overview
- Status: Now part of the SEPTA Metro as the M and the Radnor Trail
- Locale: Norristown and Wayne–Upper Darby Township
- Stations: 22 (32 before 1956)

Service
- Type: Interurban

The Philadelphia and Western Railroad was a high-speed, third rail-equipped, commuter-hauling interurban electric railroad operating in the western suburbs of Philadelphia, Pennsylvania. It is now SEPTA's M Line, though the Strafford spur has been abandoned. Part of the abandoned line within Radnor Township is now the Radnor Trail, a multi-use path or rail trail.

== Lines ==
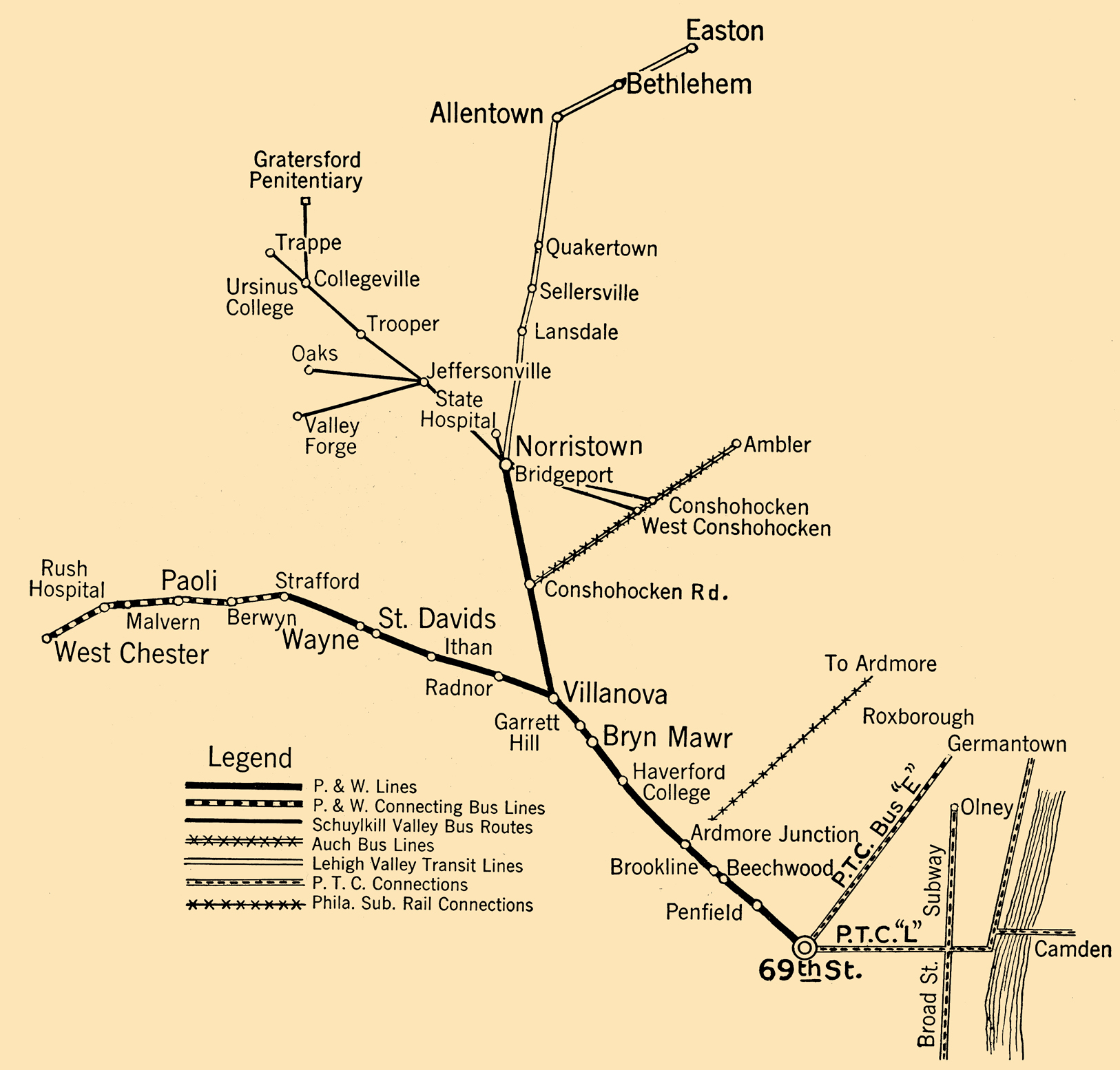
A 1941 map of Philadelphia and Western Railroad's routes and connecting lines

The current line runs from 69th Street Terminal just west of Philadelphia, west and north to Norristown, splitting from the original main line at Villanova Junction. P&W's previous main line went west to a terminus just east of Sugartown Road in Strafford, then later, another 0.47 miles (0.76 km) further, on an extension providing transfer to the Strafford station and a transfer track for freight trains. The Strafford Branch was abandoned in 1956; today, the Radnor Trail uses its old right-of-way from Radnor-Chester Road to Old Sugartown Road. Up until 1951, the P&W tracks connected with the Lehigh Valley Transit Company's Liberty Bell Route at Norristown, providing service straight through from Upper Darby to Allentown.

Interstate Commerce Commission valuation reports indicate that the railroad had interchange connections to the Pennsylvania Railroad at Millbourne Mills, Strafford, and Swedeland.

The line was built as a double track third rail line. Most structures on the line were designed to ultimately accommodate four tracks, but the additional tracks were never built. The quality of the line was quite high, with no at-grade crossings, 2 1/2 % maximum grade, stone ballast, block signals, and 85 lb/yd (42.2 kg/m) rail. The Norristown Branch, which opened on December 12, 1912, while only 6.5 miles (10.5 km) long, represented a significant construction challenge due to the high standards maintained on the line's design. The line had to cross 12 highways, the main line of the Pennsylvania Railroad at Radnor, and ended in a single track steel bridge 3,800 feet (1,200 m) long into Norristown. Some 400,000 cubic yards (310,000 m^{3}) of earth, 200,000 cubic yards (150,000 m^{3}) of stone, 25,000 cubic yards (19,000 m^{3}) of masonry, and 2,700 short tons (2,411 long tons; 2,449 t) of steel were used in its construction.

== History ==
=== 20th century ===
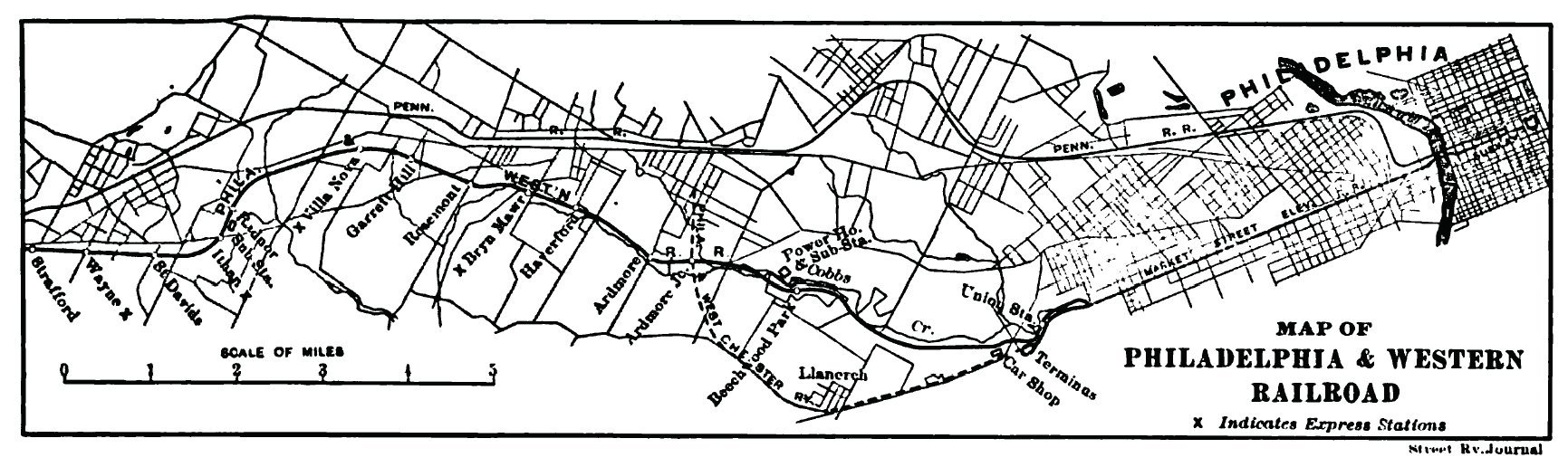
A 1907 map of the original Philadelphia and Western Railroad system, which only included the Strafford branch

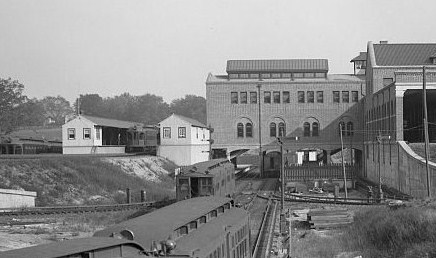
Philadelphia and Western platforms in white livery behind the 69th Street Terminal with the Market Street El train in the foreground, c. 1908

Philadelphia and Western Railway was incorporated on May 21, 1902, with capital stock of $450,000 (equal to $16,745,192 today), and was originally planned as the eastern link of a transcontinental railroad connecting to the Western Maryland Railroad at York. The WM connected at Connellsville with the Pittsburgh and West Virginia, which connected at Pittsburgh with the Wabash, which in turn connected with the Missouri Pacific, then the Denver & Rio Grande Western, then finally the Western Pacific to form a coast-to-coast railroad. This was a George and Jay Gould enterprise; the Goulds were often rumored to have a stake in the P&W, though they publicly denied it.

The first train ran from 69th Street to Strafford on May 22, 1907. On June 6, 1907, the company was reorganizing because it had defaulted on the payment of first mortgage bonds it had issued. The company was sold at public sale by the bond trustee, the Trust Company of North America for $1,000,000 to the Sheldon Syndicate of New York, which was the original owner of the company. The reorganized company had a capital stock of $4,000,000, consisting of $3,400,000 of common stock and $600,000 of 5% preferred stock.

On March 22, 1912, the planned extension to Parkesburg and York was abandoned; an alternate extension to the PRR main line in Strafford opened on October 11, 1911. The Norristown Branch opened on August 26, 1912.

The railroad built a 20-acre (8.09 ha) amusement park called the Beechwood Amusement Park in the Powder Mill Valley in 1907 to provide a potential destination for riders, but abandoned the park in 1909 due to bad management. The park opened on May 30, 1907 and received 5,000 visitors on the opening day. The park could accommodate 15,000 people and included 10 acres (4.047 ha) of rides, picnic grounds, and a lake with rowboats for rent. The park began losing money almost immediately after opening due to competition from other parks in Willow Grove, Chestnut Hill, and Washington Park.

The company experienced financial difficulties throughout much of its existence. Five years after its founding, it defaulted on its bonds and was reorganized. In 1916, Moody's rated the company's 50-year Gold First Mortgage Bonds due 1960 as "E," meaning there was "uncertain security as to principal... and a margin of safety over interest as small." The company was again reorganized as the Philadelphia and Western Railroad in 1946. It was sold to the Philadelphia Suburban Transportation Company, known as the Red Arrow Lines, in 1954. Red Arrow merged into SEPTA in 1970.

For a number of years, interurban equipment of the Lehigh Valley Transit operated on the P&W from Norristown to the 69th Street Terminal. The LVT ran north from Norristown through Lansdale, Souderton, Perkasie, and Quakertown to Allentown. LVT interurbans used an overhead trolley for operating power but were equipped with third rail shoes to operate on the P&W. In 1939, the LVT purchased a group of lightweight high speed cars known as "Red Devils" from the defunct Ohio interurban Cincinnati and Lake Erie, and they ran from 69th Street to Allentown as "Liberty Bell Limiteds." The LVT abandoned operation in 1951.

The railroad operated local freight trains to various industries until 1970, when Merion Golf Course stopped its deliveries of sand and other materials. With freight no longer running, the line no longer required FRA control, and was thus disconnected from its last interchange. Once isolated from the main railroad network, it was converted to the more cost-effective trolley-type operation that it continues to operate as.

The last train ran on the Strafford Branch on March 23, 1956.

=== 21st century ===
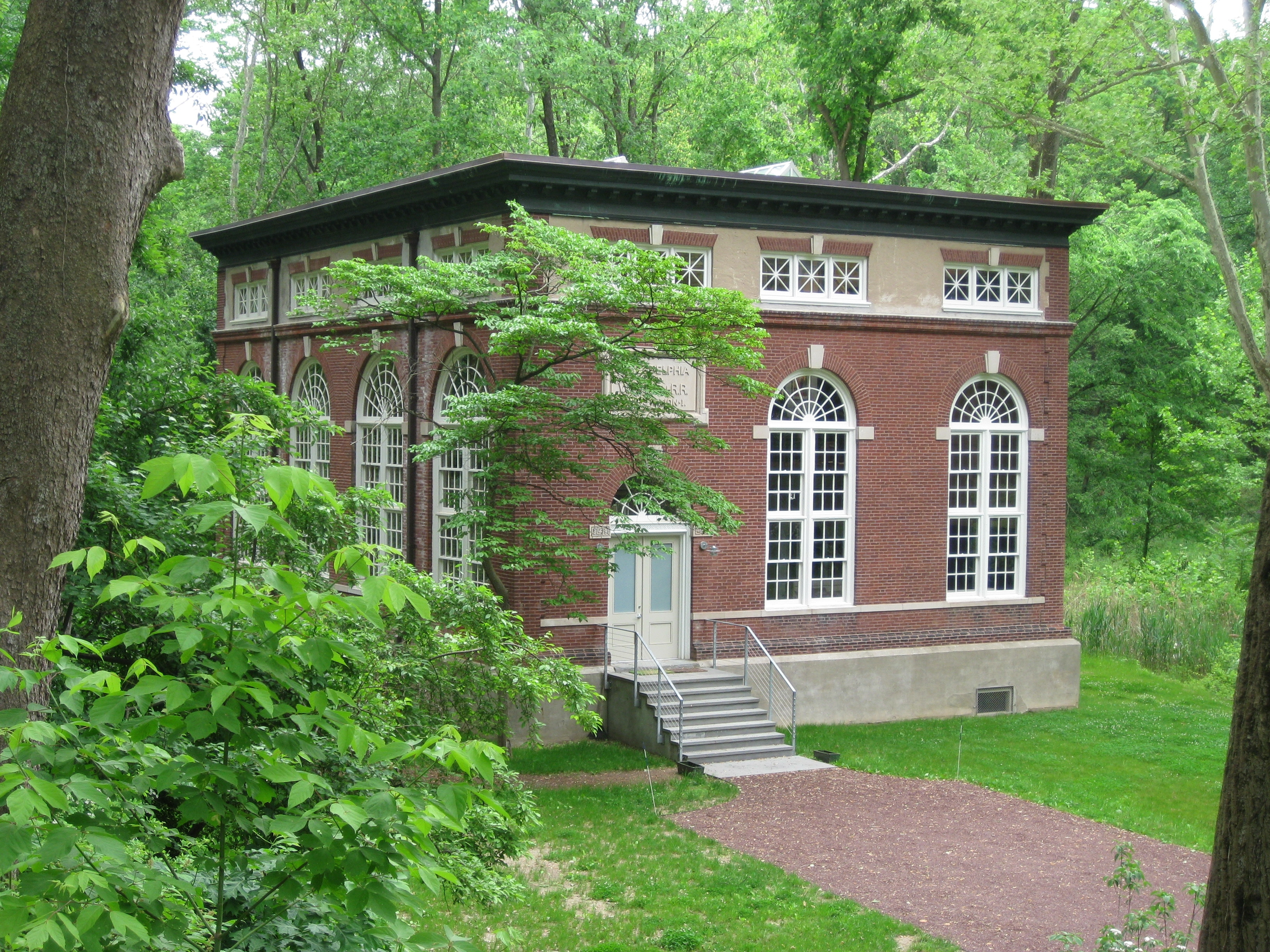
The Ithan Substation No. 1, located on Conestoga Road in Wayne, on the Strafford line; May, 2009

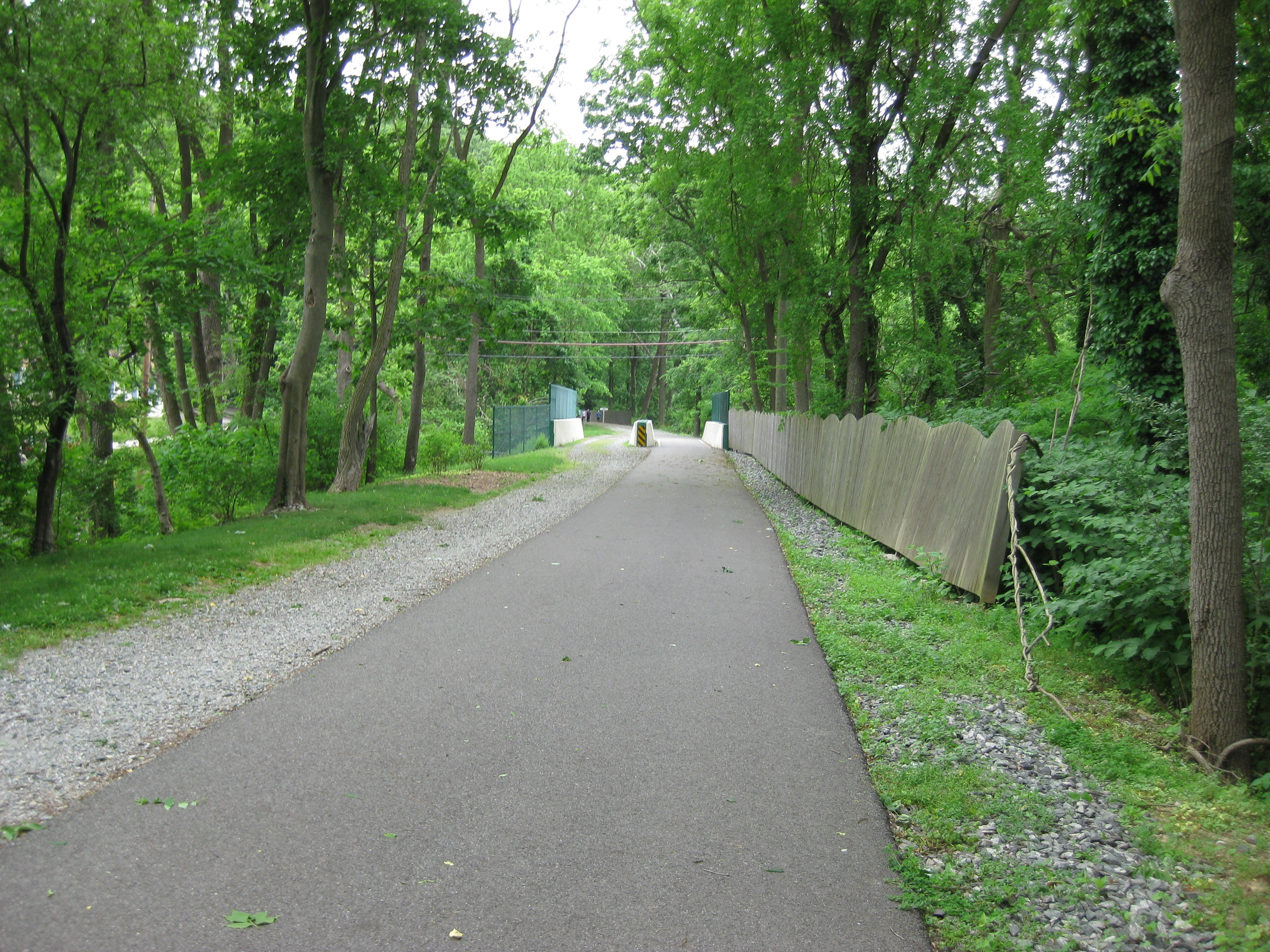
The Radnor Trail at the crossing of Conestoga Road in Wayne, formerly the road bed of the Strafford Branch

Service is still provided on the M Line today, using a fleet of 26 Class N-5 cars that feature AC-induction propulsion, steerable axles, very large windows, comfortable seating, and are capable of 80 mph (130 km/h). They were built by ABB Traction in 1992–1993 with their stainless steel bodies being built by SOREFAME, a Portugal-based Budd Company licensee. Ground was broken for the Philadelphia and Western Railroad Trail on June 10, 2004, and it opened in January 2005.

== Equipment ==
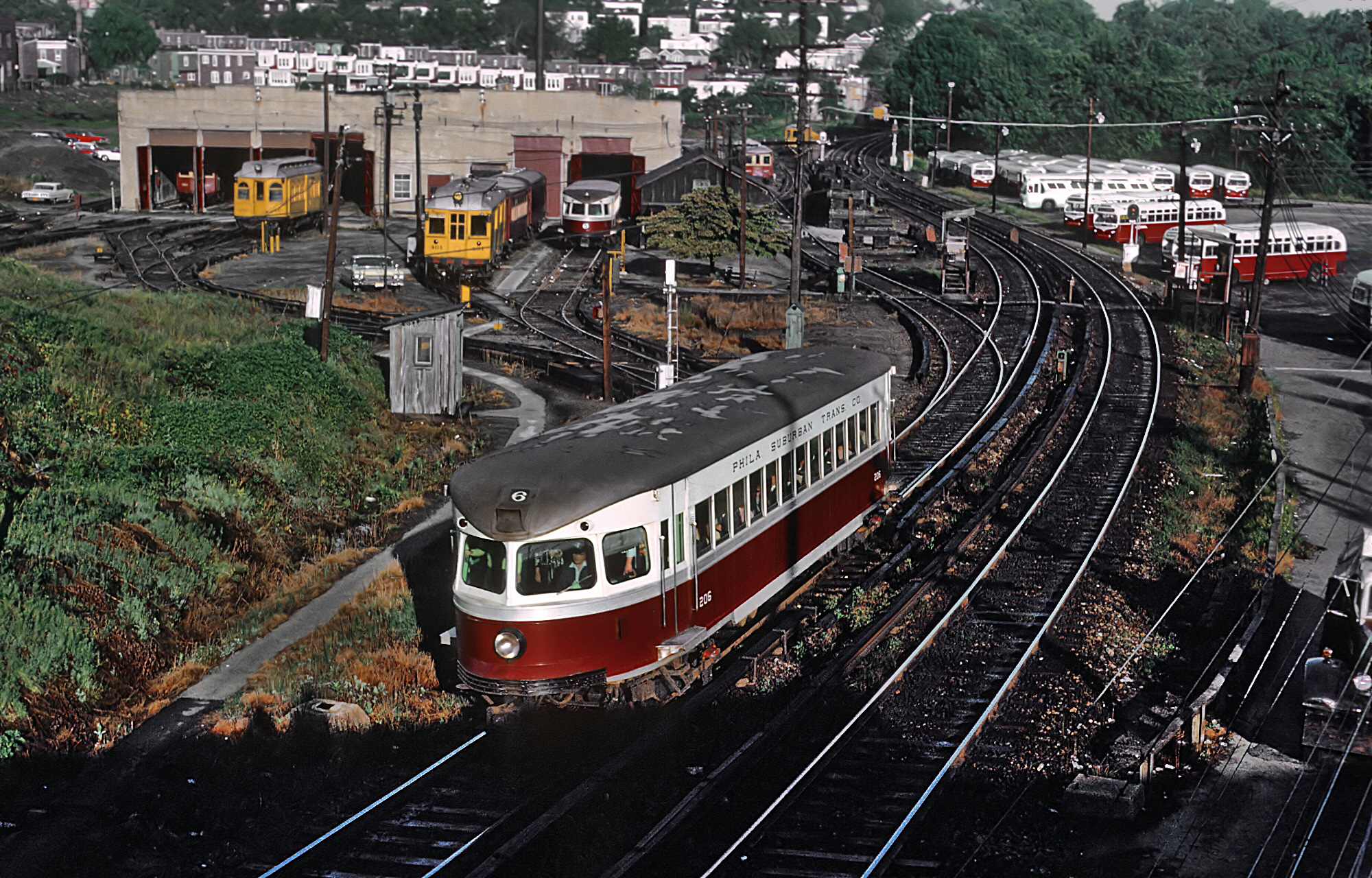
The Red Arrow Brill Bullet passes P&W shops at the Victory Avenue overpass in Upper Darby Township, September 2, 1965

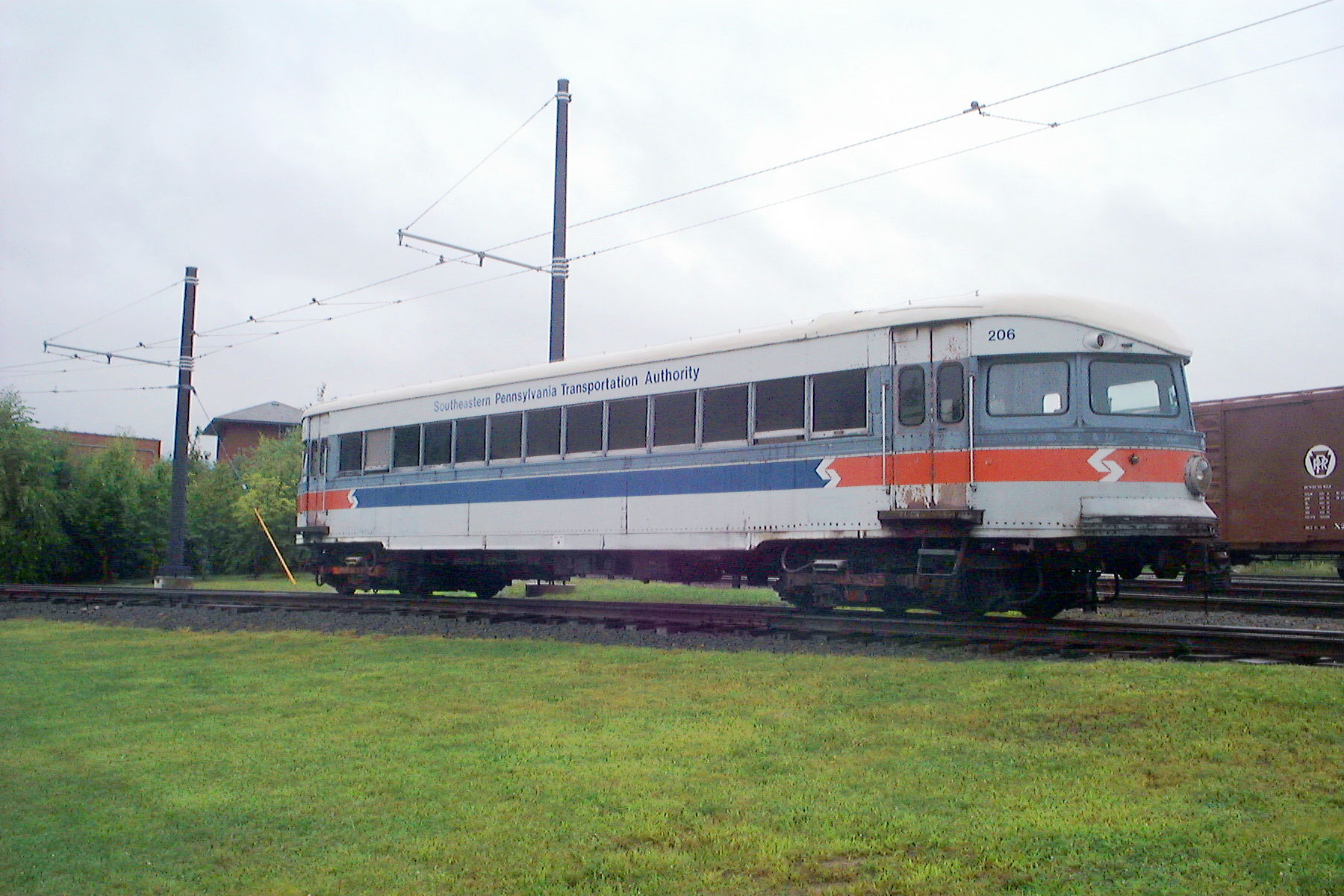
A later-model train from the P&W line, "Bullet" No. 206 on display at the Electric City Trolley Museum in Scranton

The first cars built for the P&W never ran on the P&W, since the cars were completed before the line was ready to open. Twenty-two wooden electric multiple-unit passenger cars and 2 full-baggage-configured MU's were built for the P&W by the St. Louis Car Co. in 1906. However, due to the San Francisco earthquake 12 of them went to MUNI predecessor United Railroads of San Francisco, 4 went to the Sacramento Northern Railroad, and the remainder went to the Erie Railroad Rochester-Mt. Morris Branch, where they were modified and rewired for overhead AC operation. The 12 cars that went to URR of SF had their bulkhead doors sealed and their MU capabilities removed, operating strictly as single-units. The 4 SN cars were converted into motorized combination baggage/passenger cars and used on the Woodland Branch. The two baggage cars were accepted by the P&W, where they were turned into line-maintenance cars. Finally in 1907, 22 wooden passenger cars, almost identical to the original order, arrived on P&W property. They were originally equipped with rectangular-shaped bow collectors, which were later replaced with trolley poles for use in the carbarn area in addition to third rail shoes. Of these cars, No. 46 survives, along with line car No. 401 from the original order; both of which are preserved at the Electric City Trolley Museum in Scranton, PA. Prior to the move to Scranton, they ran as a two-car train while in operation at the Philadelphia Waterfront every Christmas season for many years as the "Santa Train," with No. 401 operating as Santa's workshop and No. 46 used for the passengers.

One type of vehicle used for this line were two 4-unit articulated train sets called "Liberty Liners", which were originally the Chicago North Shore and Milwaukee Railroad's Electroliners. These shovel-nosed high-speed trains featured a bar car and were capable of speeds exceeding 100 mph (160 km/h). They were built by the St. Louis Car Co. in 1941. The Philadelphia Suburban Transportation Company bought both of these trains in 1963. PST removed their trolley poles and replaced their original gravity-type over-running third rail shoes with paddle-type shoes. They were repainted into Red Arrow's color scheme and run in rush hour service with the bar serving continental breakfast in the morning and serving snacks and spirits in the afternoon. They were retired in 1977 due to excessive power consumption plus their excessive weight was just too much for the old 75 lb. jointed rail. As of 2006 they were in museums: one, restored to its original Electroliner appearance, at the Illinois Railway Museum, and the other in her Red Arrow colors at the Rockhill Trolley Museum.

Another type of vehicle was the "Brill Bullet", which ran in service from 1931 almost to 1990. Though tested at more than 100 mph (160 km/h), these regularly ran at 80–85 mph (129–137 km/h) in regular passenger service. These streamlined electric multiple-unit passenger cars were the world's first-ever high-speed "Bullet" trains, and their design influenced later streamlined trains built in the U.S., Belgium, Germany, and Japan. Built during the Great Depression, they were the first railroad equipment ever designed in a wind tunnel in order to lessen power consumption while quickening schedule timings. And they did just that, cutting Norristown Express schedules by up to a third, from 24 to only 16 minutes while consuming some 40% less electric power than the MU equipment they replaced. See also Bullet (interurban).

A third and older type was the "Strafford Car," built between 1924 and 1929. The last Strafford Car was retired on March 30, 1990. These MU's originally had bulkhead doors to permit passengers to walk from car to car, high-mounted headlights, trolley poles, and vestibule steps. The bulkhead doors, vestibule steps, and trolley poles were later removed and headlights relocated to below the windshield to make them more aerodynamic and their motors were rewired from 60 to 100 hp (45 to 75 kW), increasing their top speed from 45 to 70 mph (72 to 113 km/h), making them easier to keep up with the newer Bullet trains. By this time the overhead wire in the carbarn area was replaced with extension wire which attached to the third rail shoes to move the MU equipment.

Three other Strafford-type cars, called the 50-series, were purchased from Brill in 1920. They were wider and longer than the later Straffords and never had vestibule steps. They were never rebuilt, so with their top speed still only 45 mph (72 km/h), they had to be used strictly in rush hour short-turn service so they wouldn't get in the way of the other much faster trains. They were finally scrapped in 1952.

Many, widely varied proposals were made to get new equipment for the P&W line but were never carried out. In 1948, St. Louis Car Co. offered a proposal for new cars of a double-ended PCC-type design. In 1964 a 65-foot-long (19.81 m), high-platform Budd Silverliner-type MU was proposed. There has been much speculation that these cars were actually under construction at Budd when the order was cancelled and the cars became the Rail Diesel Cars that were later sold to Brazil for use on their narrow-gauge mountain-climbing lines; these cars were retired just recently. Then in the late 1970s it was proposed to add on to the order for the Broad St. Subway cars from Kawasaki with a modified door arrangement. In 1982 a proposal was made to make the line into a wide-gauge, overhead wire, low-platform trolley line which would become connected with the Media–Sharon Hill Line at 69th St. Then a compromise proposal was made for a modified Kawasaki LRV with high-platform doors and standard gauge trucks. These cars would have looked similar to PCC streetcars with their single, centered headlight and two-piece windshield. Eventually by the late 1980s the order was finally placed for the current fleet of N-5 cars.

SEPTA also ran secondhand PCC subway/elevated cars from Chicago and modified Market-Frankford subway/elevated cars on this line in the late 1980s.
