= Strafford station =

SEPTA commuter rail station

Strafford
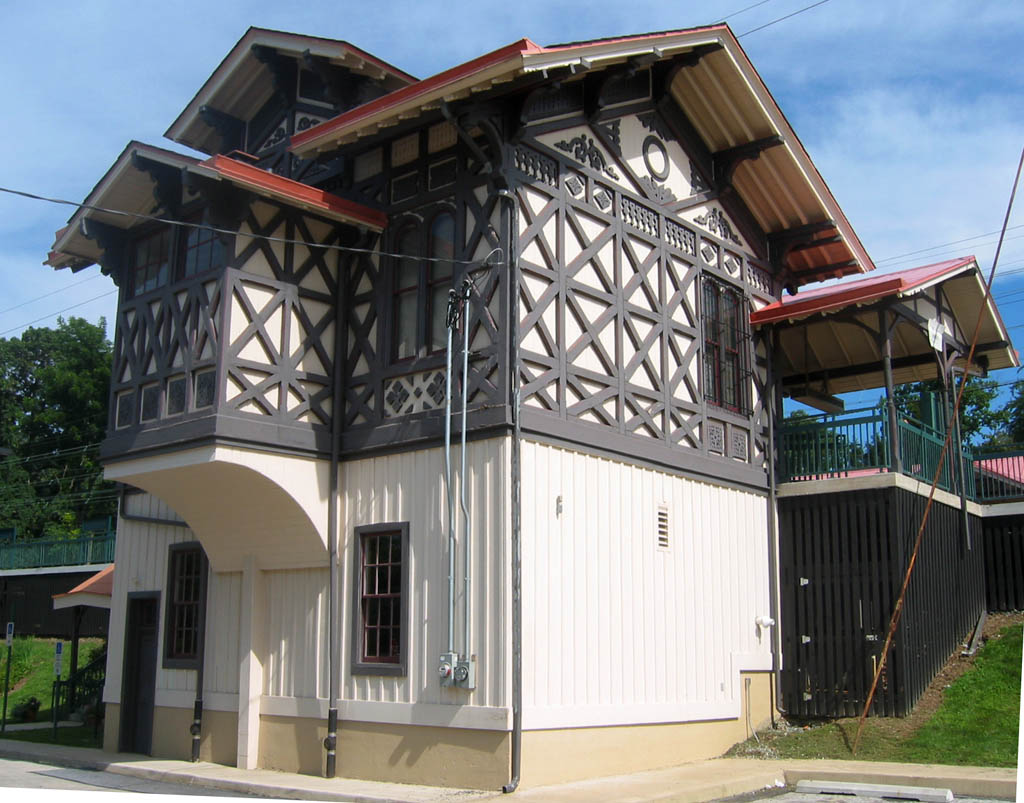

General information
- Location: 97 Old Eagle School Road; Wayne, Pennsylvania; United States
- Owner: Amtrak
- Operator: SEPTA
- Line: Amtrak Philadelphia to Harrisburg Main Line (Keystone Corridor)
- Platforms: 2 side platforms
- Tracks: 4

Construction
- Parking: 289 spaces (115 daily, 103 permit, 71 remote permit)
- Cycle facilities: 4 racks (8 spaces)
- Accessible: yes

Other information
- Fare zone: 3

History
- Electrified: September 11, 1915

Passengers
- 2017: 780 boardings 621 alightings (weekday average)
- Rank: 25 of 146

Services
Preceding station	SEPTA	Following station
Devon toward Thorndale	Paoli/Thorndale Line	Wayne toward Temple University
Former services
Preceding station	Pennsylvania Railroad	Following station
Devon toward Paoli	Paoli Line	Wayne toward Suburban Station
Preceding station	Philadelphia and Western Railroad	Following station
Terminus	Strafford Branch Until 1956	Wayne toward 69th Street
- Strafford Railroad Station
- U.S. National Register of Historic Places
- Interactive map of Strafford Railroad Station
- Location: Strafford, Pennsylvania
- Coordinates: 40.0496°N 75.4038°W
- Architect: Joseph M. Wilson and Frederick G. Thorn
- Architectural style: Stick/Eastlake
- NRHP reference No.: 84003226
- Added to NRHP: 1984
Location

Strafford station is a commuter rail station located in the western suburbs of Philadelphia at Old Eagle School Road and Crestline Road, in Tredyffrin Township, and it is served by most Paoli/Thorndale Line trains.

The ticket office at this station is open weekdays from 5:50 a.m. to 1:15 p.m., excluding holidays. There are 289 parking spaces at the station, including SEPTA permit parking in nearby lots.

This station is 15.4 track miles from Philadelphia's Suburban Station. In 2017, the average total weekday boardings at this station was 780, and the average total weekday alightings was 621.

== History ==
From 1873 to 1883, the building served as the railway station for Wayne, Pennsylvania. In 1883, the building was moved to its current location in Strafford, which was then called Eagle. The name was changed to Strafford in 1887. The landmark building was constructed in the "Eastlake" or "Stick" architectural style popular from 1855 to 1877. In 1911 the Philadelphia and Western Railroad extended their Strafford Branch to the station; this line lasted until 1956. The train station was added to the National Register of Historic Places in 1984.

Beginning in the mid-20th century, multiple sources stated, without providing evidence, that Strafford Station was built for the 1876 Centennial Exposition, variously saying that it was used as the Catalogue Building or Japanese Pavilion. No primary sources have been found to corroborate these claims, and in fact significant documentary and physical evidence suggests otherwise, including the station's architecture being similar in form to other Pennsylvania Railroad passenger stations of the 1870s including Wynnewood Station on the same line.

The Southeastern Pennsylvania Transportation Authority (SEPTA) restored the station between 1999 and 2002 after damage from a June, 1999 fire. Work included restoring the historic station building as well as the outbound shelter. The station was made accessible-compliant with ramps to the platforms. Mini-high-level platforms will be installed after the Amtrak Keystone Corridor project is complete.

== Station layout ==
Strafford has two low-level side platforms with pathways connecting the platforms to the inner tracks.
