= Doe v. Southeastern Pennsylvania Transportation Authority =

US federal case heard in 1995

Doe v. Southeastern Pennsylvania Transportation Authority, decided on December 28, 1995, was a case heard in the United States Court of Appeals for the Third Circuit. The issue before the court was whether there was a conditional right to privacy in prescription drug records. The court held that medical records, prescription drug records, and an individual's HIV status are constitutionally protected, but set aside the verdict where the opposing party established a legitimate purpose in accessing that information.

== Facts of the case ==
John Doe was an employee for the Southeastern Pennsylvania Transportation Authority SEPTA who had contracted Acquired Immunodeficiency Syndrome HIV/AIDS. Judith Pierce was the chief administrative officer for SEPTA who managed the costs of SEPTA's employee prescription drug program. This program was part of an insurance package offered to SEPTA employees. SEPTA had entered into a new prescription plan with Rite Aid, which provided Pierce with reports that included the names of the employees, linking them with the prescriptions they were filling.

Doe was currently taking various prescriptions, including Retrovir, to treat his condition. Due to the delicate nature of his disease, Doe expressed concern about maintaining the secrecy of his condition. He revealed his AIDS status to Dr. Richard Press, the head of SEPTA's medical department, who in turn assured him that employee names were not typically linked to the list of prescriptions reviewed.

Because of the new reports, Pierce was able to link the drugs Doe took to his name, and deduced his condition as a result. Doe became aware of this breach of his privacy, and brought this action, claiming he felt ostracized at work.

== Westinghouse factors ==
To determine whether this given disclosure constituted an actionable invasion of privacy, the court relied on the factors enumerated in United States v. Westinghouse Electric Co.

1. type of record requested
2. the information the record actually does or may contain
3. the potential for harm in any subsequent non-consensual disclosure
4. the injury from disclosure to the relationship in which the record was generated
5. the adequacy of safeguards to prevent unauthorized disclosure
6. the degree of need for access
7. whether there is an express statutory mandate, articulated public policy, or other recognizable public interests favoring access

== Holding ==
After weighing each of these factors, the court held:

A self-insured employer's need to access to employee prescription records under its health insurance plan, when the information disclosed is only for the purpose of monitoring the plans by those with a need to know, outweighs an employee's interest in keeping his prescription drug purchases confidential. Such minimal intrusion, although an impingement on privacy, is insufficient to constitute a constitutional violation.
