= Doe v. Borough of Barrington =

American personal privacy lawsuit

Doe v. Borough of Barrington was an American personal privacy lawsuit that was adjudicated in the US District Court in New Jersey in 1990. In the case, the court decided that a family's privacy rights were violated when a police officer told their neighbors that the husband, John Doe, had HIV/AIDS. He had divulged that information to the officer during a search.

Because the information was given to a state employee in confidence, and because there was no compelling government interest in giving that information to the neighbors, the police violated the family's privacy rights by repeating it.

Due to the release of this information, the family, referred to as Doe, suffered substantial harm due to the stigma attached then to HIV/AIDS.

== Facts of the case ==
On March 25, 1987, Jane Doe, John Doe, and a friend were driving in the Borough of Barrington when they were stopped by police. After some questioning, John Doe was arrested. They were all escorted to the police station and the vehicle was impounded. Jane Doe and the friend were released, but John Doe was held in custody. While at the jail, John Doe warned the police officers that he was HIV positive and that they should be careful while searching him because he had "weeping lesions".

Jane Doe and the friend returned to Jane's home, in Runnemede, New Jersey in the friend's car. The two went inside, leaving the car running. The car ultimately slipped into gear and slid into the neighbors' fence.

When Runnemede police arrived, they spoke to the neighbors who had suffered the property damage along with Jane Doe and her friend. During the conversation, the Runnemede officers conferred with a Barrington officer, who informed them of John Doe's medical condition

After Jane Doe and her friend left the scene, one of the Runnemede officers informed the neighbors of John Doe's condition. The officer said that they should wash with disinfectant just to be on the safe side. The neighbors called parents who children attended the same school as the Doe children and called the media. Eleven parents pulled 19children out of the school and the media covered the story. At least one reporter mentioned the Does' name. The Does claimed that, after this happened they suffered from discrimination, harassment and humiliation.

== Ruling ==
There were a few reasons why the court decided in favor of the Does. The court stated that the Does' right to privacy was violated because the information that Jane Doe's husband gave the police officers (being HIV positive) was confidential information. Even though the information was given willingly and without prompting, Jane Doe's husband offered that information in a private setting to government officials who are expected to keep that kind of information secret. While the Barrington officers may have only told Runnemede officers, it was a Runnemede officer, Officer Smith, who broke this confidence.

Furthermore, the fact that there was absolutely no reason for Officer Smith to give that information to the neighbors plays a part in this ruling. Enough information was available at the time to support the conclusion that mere physical contact would not spread the disease. Telling the neighbors to wash with disinfectant in order to prevent the spread of the disease to them was not a compelling government interest in breaking the confidence for two reasons: First, there's no way the neighbors could get the disease from mere physical contact, and this was known at the time of the incident; second, because they could not contract the disease from this physical contact, there was no need to tell them to wash with disinfectant, because it was unnecessary.

Something else that played a part in the court's decision was the stigma attached to AIDS. While enough scientific research was known at the time about AIDS, people still attached negative stigmas to those who were infected. Usually, people associated AIDS with homosexuals and drug users. Because of this stigma, the court in this case found that the stigma attached to Jane Doe and her children, coupled with the fact that there was no compelling interest in revealing John Doe's condition to Jane Doe's neighbors, constituted a breach of privacy that should have been extended not only to John Doe but to the entire family. Also, this type of information being of the most personal kind weighted greatly in favor of John Doe.

== Precedent ==
Cases that helped the court reach this decision were:

Whalen v. Roe (In this case, it was determined that the government has a duty not to disclose private information. Because police officers are considered government employees, this duty applies to them).

United States v. Westinghouse (This is the case where the standard of weighing societal interests in disclosure against the privacy interest involved).

Carter v. Broadlawns Medical Center (Here, the medical center released medical records to the center's chaplain. The court decided this was a breach of privacy, even though the chaplain could have been considered a person in a confidence-keeping position, because it was unnecessary to release the records to this chaplain for the purposes of his employment).

Woods v. White (A person's right to privacy does not vanish simply because they're incarcerated. Here, an inmate's medical history – and the fact that he had AIDS – was revealed to prison personnel who didn't need to know about his medical history to fulfill their employment duties).

== Constitution ==
The 14th Amendment doesn't explicitly guarantee a right to privacy. Section 1 of the 14th Amendment states: "All persons born or naturalized in the United States, and subject to the jurisdiction thereof, are citizens of the United States and of the state wherein they reside. No state shall make or enforce any law which shall abridge the privileges or immunities of citizens of the United States; nor shall any state deprive any person of life, liberty, or property, without due process of law; nor deny to any person within its jurisdiction the equal protection of the laws."

There is a lot of debate in many cases over what this actually means. The part that keeps the state from depriving a person of life, liberty or property has been interpreted, in this case, to allow a right to privacy. The police officers being considered government employees makes them representatives of the state. Since the state cannot deprive a person of their liberty, and part of that liberty is a right to privacy, the police here had no reason to break John Doe's confidence and reveal to the neighbors his AIDS diagnosis.
