= SEPTA =

Public transit agency in the eastern US

Southeastern Pennsylvania Transportation Authority (SEPTA)

Overview
- Area served: Philadelphia and the surrounding regions in Pennsylvania, as well as limited services in New Castle County, Delaware and Mercer County, New Jersey
- Locale: Philadelphia metropolitan area
- Transit type: Transit bus; Trolleybus; Streetcar; Light rail; Light metro; Rapid transit; Commuter rail
- Number of lines: 196
- Number of stations: 290
- Daily ridership: 822,000
- Annual ridership: 223.5 million (2020)
- Chief executive: Scott Sauer (General Manager)
- Headquarters: 1234 Market Street, Philadelphia, Pennsylvania, U.S.
- Website: septa.org

Operation
- Began operation: November 1, 1965
- Number of vehicles: 2,897 (2018)
SEPTA system map
Geographically-accurate map of SEPTA and connecting rail transit services as of 2025. Includes Regional Rail, rapid transit, light metro, light rail, and streetcar lines.

The Southeastern Pennsylvania Transportation Authority, abbreviated as SEPTA, is the state agency responsible for providing and operating public transportation services in the Philadelphia metropolitan area. It also manages projects that maintain, replace, and expand its infrastructure, facilities, and vehicles.

SEPTA is the major transit provider for Philadelphia and four surrounding counties within the Philadelphia metropolitan area, including Delaware, Montgomery, Bucks, and Chester counties. It is a state-created authority, with the majority of its board appointed by the five counties it serves. Several SEPTA commuter rail and bus services serve New Castle County, Delaware and Mercer County, New Jersey, although service to Philadelphia from South Jersey is provided by the PATCO Speedline, which is run by the Delaware River Port Authority, a bi-state agency, and NJ Transit, which operates many bus lines and a commuter rail line to Philadelphia.

SEPTA has the sixth-largest U.S. rapid transit system in the nation by ridership, and the fifth-largest overall transit system in the nation, with about 302 million annual unlinked trips as of 2018. It controls 290 active stations, over 450 miles (720 km) of track, 2,350 revenue vehicles, and 196 routes. It also oversees shared-ride services in Philadelphia and ADA services across the region, which are operated by third-party contractors, Amtrak, and NJ Transit.

SEPTA is the only U.S. transit authority that operates all five major types of terrestrial transit vehicles: motorbusses, trolleybuses, light rail trains, rapid transit subway and elevated trains, and regional commuter rail trains. This title was shared with Boston's Massachusetts Bay Transportation Authority, which also ran ferryboat service, until trolleybuses in Greater Boston were discontinued in 2023, leaving SEPTA as the sole remaining U.S. transit authority operating all five terrestrial transit vehicle types.

== History ==
=== Formation ===
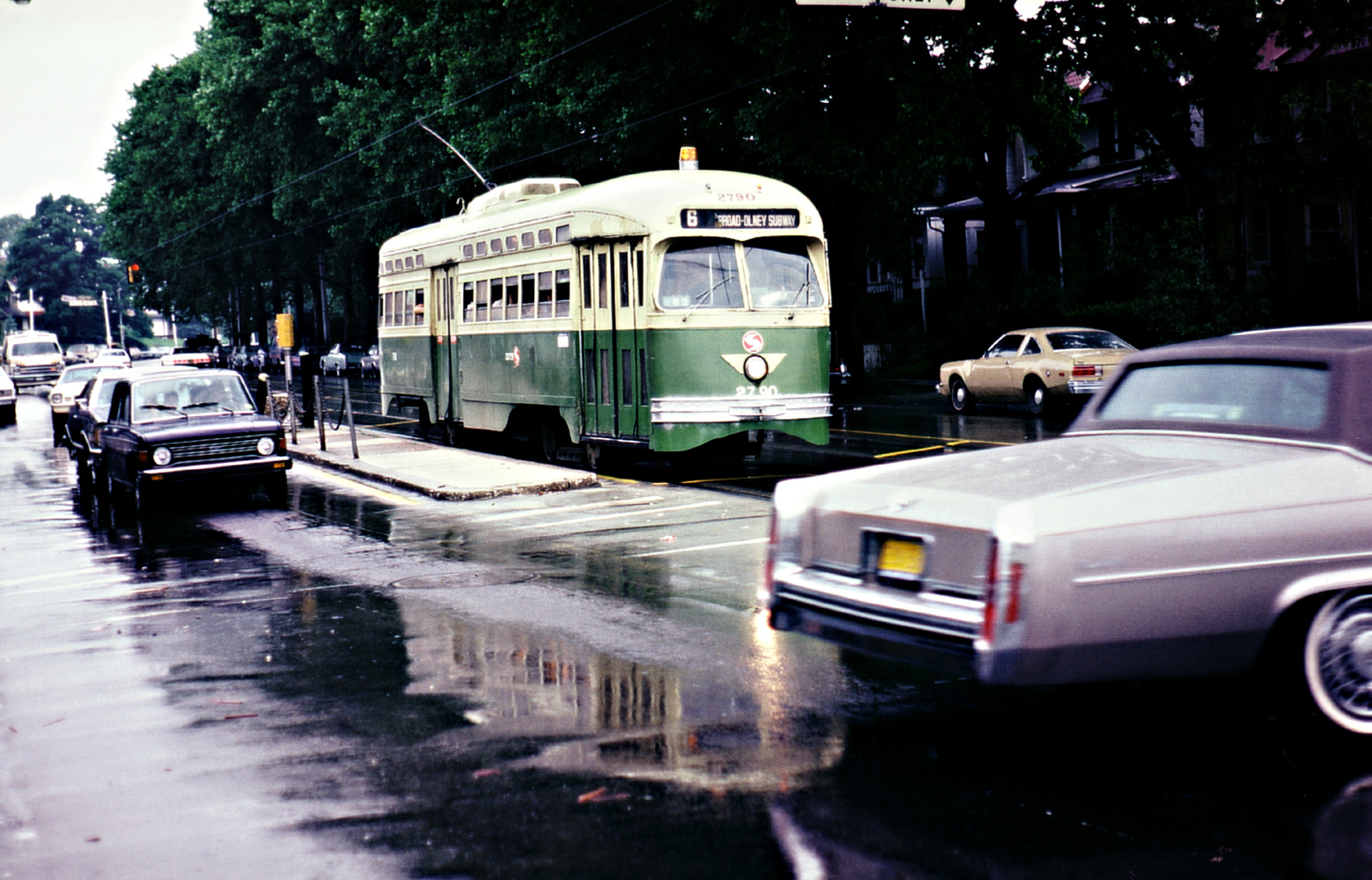
The former SEPTA Route 6 trolley in Philadelphia, c. 1980

SEPTA was created by the Pennsylvania General Assembly, on August 17, 1963, to coordinate government funding to various transit and railroad companies in southeastern Pennsylvania. It commenced operations on February 18, 1964.

On November 1, 1965, SEPTA absorbed two predecessor agencies:

- The Passenger Service Improvement Corporation (PSIC), was created on January 20, 1960, to work with the Reading Company and Pennsylvania Railroad to improve commuter rail service and help the railroads maintain otherwise unprofitable passenger rail service.
- The Southeastern Pennsylvania Transportation Compact (SEPACT), was created September 8, 1961, by the City of Philadelphia and the Counties of Montgomery, Bucks, and Chester to coordinate regional transport issues.

SEPTA's logo in 1970s

By 1966, the Reading Company and Pennsylvania Railroad commuter railroad lines were operated under contract to SEPTA. On February 1, 1968, the Pennsylvania Railroad merged with the New York Central railroad to become Penn Central. On June 21, 1970, it filed for bankruptcy. Penn Central continued to operate in bankruptcy until 1976, when Conrail took over its assets along with those of several other bankrupt railroads, including the Reading Company. Conrail operated commuter services under contract to SEPTA until January 1, 1983, when SEPTA took over operations and acquired track, rolling stock, and other assets to form the Railroad Division.

=== Subsequent expansion ===
On September 30, 1968, SEPTA acquired the Philadelphia Transportation Company (PTC), which operated a citywide system of bus, trolley, and trackless trolley routes, the Market–Frankford Line (subway-elevated rail), the Broad Street Line (subway), and the Delaware River Bridge Line (subway-elevated rail to City Hall, Camden, NJ) which became SEPTA's City Transit Division. The PTC had been created in 1940 with the merger of the Philadelphia Rapid Transit Company (formed in 1902), and a group of smaller, then-independent transit companies operating within the city and its environs. Shortly after the acquisition, SEPTA operation of the Bridge Line ceased to allow for construction of the PATCO Speedline.

On January 30, 1970, SEPTA acquired the Philadelphia Suburban Transportation Company, also known as the Red Arrow Lines, which included the Philadelphia and Western Railroad (P&W) route (the modern day M), the Media–Sharon Hill Line (the modern day D), and several suburban bus routes in Delaware County. Today, this is known as the Victory Division, though it is sometimes referred to as the Red Arrow Division.

Service on the Broad Street Line was extended south two stops to Pattison Street in 1973, in order to serve the new sports and entertainment district in the area. This remains the only expansion of rapid transit rail service in the SEPTA era.

On March 1, 1976, SEPTA acquired the transit operations of Schuylkill Valley Lines, known today as the Frontier Division, expanding bus service in Montgomery and Bucks Counties.

Meanwhile, SEPTA gradually began to assume operational control over the Pennsylvania Railroad and Reading Company commuter services, owing to Conrail's exit from passenger rail in 1983. For the sake of both efficiency as well as looming budget cuts, SEPTA sought to consolidate the formerly-competing services, leading to severe cutbacks through the 1980s. Commuter rail service outside of the five-county area was cut in 1981, effectively ending all non-electric train service on the system. Diesel shuttles on the Fox Chase Rapid Transit Line to Newtown were started shortly thereafter, but were once again cut in 1983. Subsequent proposals have since been made to restore service to Allentown, Bethlehem, West Chester, and Newtown, with support from commuters, local officials, and pro-train advocates.

Despite these cuts, two large-scale expansions of Regional Rail occurred in the 1980s. First, the Center City Commuter Connection opened in 1984, which connected the former Reading and Pennsylvania services via a new tunnel and station through Center City. Second, the Airport Line, a City-funded project, opened in 1985 bringing rail service to Philadelphia International Airport via a branch of the former Reading Company. Additionally, service on the West Chester Branch was restored as far south as Wawa in 2022.

Through the 1990s, SEPTA's planning department focused on the Schuylkill Valley Metro, a "cross-county metro" that would re-establish service to Phoenixville, Pottstown, and Reading without requiring the rider to go into Philadelphia. However, ridership projections were dubious, and the Federal Railroad Administration declined to fund the project.

=== 21st century ===
Many derelict lines under SEPTA ownership have been converted to rail trails, postponing any restoration proposals for the foreseeable future. Proposals have also been made for increased service on existing lines, including later evenings and Sundays to Wilmington, Delaware, and Newark. Maryland's MARC commuter rail system is considering extending its service as far as Newark, which would allow passengers to connect directly between SEPTA and MARC. Other recent proposals have also focused on extending and enhancing SEPTA's other transit services. Senator of Pennsylvania, Bob Casey, has supported recent proposals expanding the Broad Street Line to the Philadelphia Naval Shipyard. As of December 2017, SEPTA had completed an Environmental Impact Statement to extend the Norristown High Speed Line to the King of Prussia area. However, the project was discontinued in March 2023.

In September 2021, SEPTA proposed rebranding their rail transit services, the Market–Frankford Line, Broad Street Line, Subway–Surface trolley lines, Norristown High Speed Line, Route 15 trolley, and the Media–Sharon Hill Line) as the "SEPTA Metro", in order to make the system easier to navigate. Under this proposal, new maps, station signage, and line designations would be created. Under the proposed nomenclature, trunk lines would receive a letter and a color, with services having a numeric suffix and service name to make wayfinding easier. Services on the current Market–Frankford Line, for instance, would be called "the L" and colored blue, with local service becoming the "L1 Market–Frankford Local". SEPTA budgeted $40 million for the rebranding in June 2023. SEPTA upgraded its website in late 2023 in advance of the planned rollout of SEPTA Metro in 2024.

In 2024, general manager Leslie Richards resigned, and was replaced by Scott Sauer.

In 2025, owing to severe state budget shortfalls, SEPTA announced unprecedented cuts to its services: reducing service on all bus and rail lines by 20%, eliminating 32 bus routes, and shortening a further 16 routes. It also announced an increase to transit fares to $2.90 per ride. Democratic politicians in Pennsylvania sought to avoid these cuts by passing a comprehensive funding bill, but Republican politicians in the state, who often represent rural districts, opposed the comprehensive funding package. Republicans proposed instead to shift money from the state's Public Transportation Trust Fund towards SEPTA, which Democrats described as an unserious proposal that robbed earmarked funding from transit projects. On September 4, a court order halted any further service cuts while restoring already cut services. The judge allowed the fare increases to go forward on September 14.

== Governance ==
At its founding in 1968, the board had 11 members. In 1991 the state legislature added four additional members, giving themselves more influence on the board.

SEPTA is governed by a 15-member board of directors:

- The City of Philadelphia appoints two members: one member is appointed by the Mayor, the other by the City Council President. These two board members can veto any item that is approved by the full SEPTA board because the city represents more than two-thirds of SEPTA's local funding, fare revenue, and ridership. However, the veto may be overridden with the vote of at least 75% of the full board within 30 days.
- Bucks, Chester, Delaware, and Montgomery counties appoint two members each. These members are appointed by the county commissioners in Bucks, Chester, and Montgomery and by the county council in Delaware.
- The majority and minority leaders of the two houses of the Pennsylvania State Legislature (the Senate and the House of Representatives) appoint one member each, for a total of four members.
- The governor appoints one member.

The members of the SEPTA Board as of November 2026 are:

Name	Appointed by
Michael A. Carroll	City of Philadelphia
Richard R. Harris, Esquire	City of Philadelphia
Kenneth Lawrence Jr. (Chairman)	Montgomery County
Neil K. Makhija	Montgomery County
John F. Cordisco	Bucks County
Matthew L. Trzaska	Bucks County
Kevin L. Johnson	Chester County
Marian D. Moskowitz (Vice chair)	Chester County
Daniel R. Muroff, Esq.	Delaware County
Mark H. Dambly	Delaware County
Robert D. Fox	Pennsylvania Governor
Thomas J. Ellis	Senate Majority Leader
William J. Leonard	Senate Minority Leader
Esteban Vera Jr.	House Majority Leader
Martina White	House Minority Leader

The day-to-day operations of SEPTA are handled by the general manager, who is appointed and hired by the board of directors. The general manager is assisted by nine department heads called assistant general managers.

The present general manager is Scott Sauer. Past general managers include Leslie Richards, Jeffrey Knueppel, Joseph Casey, Faye L. M. Moore, Joseph T. Mack, John "Jack" Leary, Louis Gambaccini, and David L. Gunn. Past acting general managers include James Kilcur and Bill Stead.

SEPTA is a member of the Northeast Corridor Commission, a federal commission on Northeast Corridor rail service.

== Ridership ==
SEPTA Ridership (millions of unlinked trips)

In FY2024, annual ridership was 198.3 million individual rides. 11.1 million were rides on SEPTA's suburban network, 13.7 million were rides on SEPTA's "regional rail" network, and 122.1 million were rides on SEPTA's "city transit" network.

Ridership had decreased 13% from 2014 to 2019 due to many factors. Some explanations mentioned by SEPTA for this decrease are "increased competition, structural changes in ridership patterns, and moderate gas prices." The 24% decrease in ridership from 2019 to 2020 was mostly attributable to the impact of government-implemented lock-downs in response to the COVID-19 pandemic that began in mid-March 2020.

As of the end of FY2024, both SEPTA's transit and regional rail operations continue to grow back to pre-COVID ridership volumes. June 2024 saw ridership of regional rail at 66% and transit at 75%, combined for a systemwide recovery rate of 74% of pre-COVID ridership. For transit separated by mode, bus routes had the highest recovery rate of 84%; trackless trolleys were lowest at 62%; light rail and heavy rail were at 63% and 66%, respectively. In FY2025 SEPTA ridership increased to 222.3 million, approximately 76% of its pre-pandemic level.

== Routes ==
SEPTA's public services consist of three main networks: metro, bus operations, and regional rail.

=== Metro ===
SEPTA's urban rail transit services, including rapid transit, light rail, streetcar, and light metro services, are organized as SEPTA Metro. SEPTA has the largest trolley system in the United States.

Line	Type	Service	Termini	
Line	Type	Service	South/West	North/East
L (SEPTA Metro)	Rapid transit	All Stops	69th Street T.C.	Frankford T.C.
B (SEPTA Metro)	Rapid transit	Local	NRG Station	Fern Rock T.C.
B (SEPTA Metro)	Rapid transit	Express	Walnut–Locust; NRG Station (Sports Express)	Fern Rock T.C.
B (SEPTA Metro)	Rapid transit	Spur	8th–Market	Olney Transit Center (Weekday); Fern Rock T.C. (Saturday)
T (SEPTA Metro)	Light rail	Lancaster Avenue	63rd–Malvern/Overbrook	13th Street
T (SEPTA Metro)	Light rail	Baltimore Avenue	61st–Baltimore/Angora	13th Street
T (SEPTA Metro)	Light rail	Chester Avenue	Yeadon; Darby Transit Center (Limited)	13th Street
T (SEPTA Metro)	Light rail	Woodland Avenue	Darby Transit Center	13th Street
T (SEPTA Metro)	Light rail	Elmwood Avenue	80th Street/Eastwick	13th Street
G (SEPTA Metro)	Streetcar	All Stops	63rd–Girard	Richmond–Westmoreland or Frankford–Delaware
D (SEPTA Metro)	Light rail	Media	Orange Street/Media	69th Street T.C.
D (SEPTA Metro)	Light rail	Sharon Hill	Chester Pike/Sharon Hill	69th Street T.C.
M (SEPTA Metro)	Light metro	Local	69th Street T.C.	Norristown T.C.

=== Buses ===
SEPTA lists 115 bus routes, not including about two dozen school trips, with most routes in the City of Philadelphia proper. SEPTA generally employs one-digit, and two-digit route numbering for its City Division routes; 90-series and 100-series routes for its Suburban Division routes; 200-series routes for its Regional Rail connector routes; 300-series routes for other specialized or third-party contract routes; and 400-series routes for limited-service buses to schools within Philadelphia. There were formerly lettered bus routes, but all except Route K (which will be later merged into an extended Route 26 bus route as part of a bus route reorganization project) have changed to number designations as of February 2025.

==== New Bus Network ====
SEPTA first announced a system-wide redesign of their bus network in 2022, initially called "Bus Revolution", which had not been wholistically overhauled since the agency was formed. The Bus Revolution plan was approved by the SEPTA board in May 2024 after two years of delay, which included pushback from some riders. Criticism on the plan centered around equity and access, particularly for low-income and elderly riders.

The plan was delayed indefinitely due to SEPTA's budget crisis in the summer of 2025, and then re-unveiled as "New Bus Network" in March 2026.

The first phase of the New Bus Network went into effect on August 23, 2026. It removed routes 35, 47M, 62, 78, 80, 89, and 106, and modified routing of routes 76, 17, 25, 4, 45, and 64, and introduced two new routes, 72 and 79.

Two additional phases are scheduled, with Phase 2 in February 2027 to restructure routes serving Chester County and the western suburbs, and Phase 3, which would focus on Montgomery and Bucks counties. Further phases will be announced in spring 2027.

==== Trolleybuses ====
Trolleybuses, or trackless trolleys as they are called by SEPTA, operate on routes 59, 66, and 75. Service resumed in spring 2008 after a nearly five-year suspension. Until June 2002, five SEPTA routes were operated with trackless trolleys, using AM General vehicles built in 1978–79. Routes 29, 59, 66, 75 and 79 used trackless trolleys, but were converted to diesel buses for an indefinite period starting in 2002 (routes 59, 66, 75) and 2003 (routes 29, 79).

The aging AM General trackless trolleys were retired and in February 2006, SEPTA placed an order for 38 new low-floor trackless trolleys from New Flyer Industries, enough for routes 59, 66 and 75, and the pilot trackless trolley arrived for testing in June 2007. The vehicles were delivered between February and August 2008. Trackless trolley service resumed on Routes 66 and 75 on April 14, 2008, and on Route 59 the following day, but was initially limited to just one or two vehicles on each route, as new trolley buses gradually replaced the motorbuses serving the routes over a period of several weeks.

The SEPTA board voted in October 2006 not to order additional vehicles for Routes 29 and 79, and those routes permanently became non-electric.

=== Regional rail ===
On January 1, 1983, SEPTA took over the commuter rail services formerly operated by Conrail under contract and reorganized them as Regional Rail. This division operates 13 lines serving more than 150 stations covering most of the five-county southeastern Pennsylvania region. It also runs trains to Wilmington and Newark in Delaware and Trenton and West Trenton in New Jersey. Daily ridership on the regional rail network averaged 58,713 in 2023, with the Lansdale/Doylestown, Paoli/Thorndale, and Trenton lines each receiving over 7,000 riders per day.

Most of the cars used on the lines were built between 1976 and 2011. After building delays, the first Silverliner V cars were introduced into service on October 29, 2010. These cars represent the first new electric multiple units purchased for the Regional Rail system since the completion of the Silverliner IV order in 1976 and the first such purchase to be made by SEPTA. As of March 19, 2013, all Silverliner V cars are in service and make up almost one-third of the current 400 car Regional Rail fleet, which are replacing the older, aging fleet.

In July 2016, a serious structural flaw, including cracks in a weight-bearing beam on a train car's undercarriage, was discovered during an emergency inspection to exist in more than 95% of the 120 Silverliner V cars in the SEPTA regional rail fleet. SEPTA announced that it would take "the rest of the summer" to repair and would reduce the system's capacity by as much as 50%. In addition to regular commuter rail service, the loss of system capacity was also expected to cause transportation issues for the Democratic National Convention being held in Philadelphia on the week of July 25, 2016.

== Operational divisions ==
SEPTA has three major operating divisions: City Transit, Suburban, and Regional Rail. These divisions reflect the different transit and railroad operations that SEPTA has assumed. SEPTA also offers Access (formerly CCT Connect) paratransit service.

=== City Transit Division ===
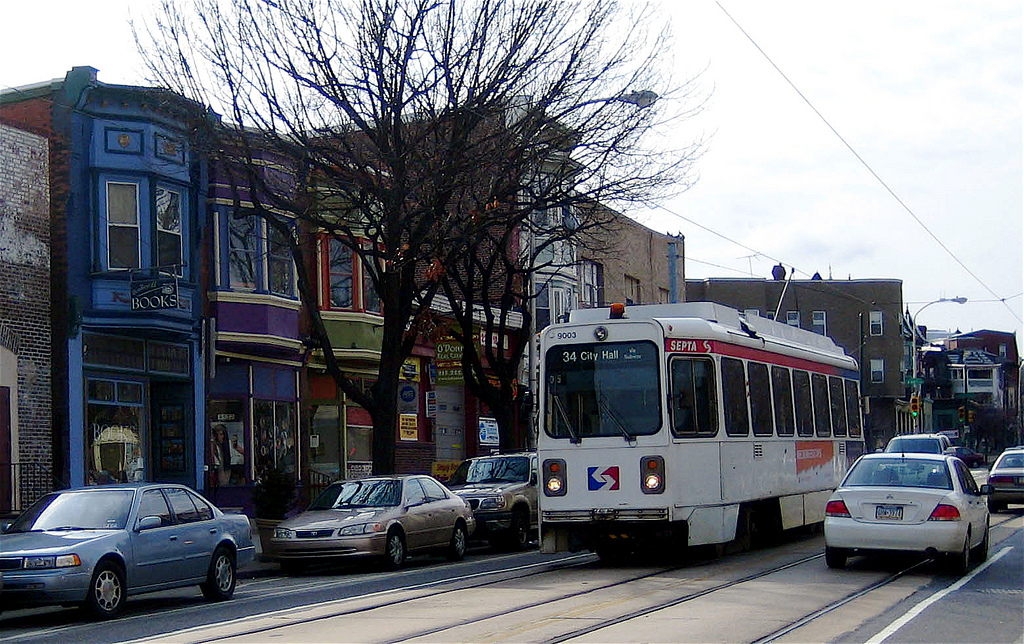
SEPTA's T2 trolley in the 4500 block of Baltimore Avenue

The City Transit Division operates routes mostly within Philadelphia, including buses, subway–surface trolleys, one surface trolley line, the Market–Frankford Line, and the Broad Street Line. SEPTA City Transit Division surface routes include bus and trackless trolley lines. Some city division routes extend into Delaware, Montgomery, and Bucks counties. This division is the descendant of the Philadelphia Transportation Company. Aside from the two heavy rail lines, the City Transit Division has eight operating depots in this division: five of these depots only operate buses, one is a mixed bus/trackless trolley depot, one is a mixed bus/streetcar depot and one is a streetcar-only facility.

=== Suburban Division ===
==== Victory District ====
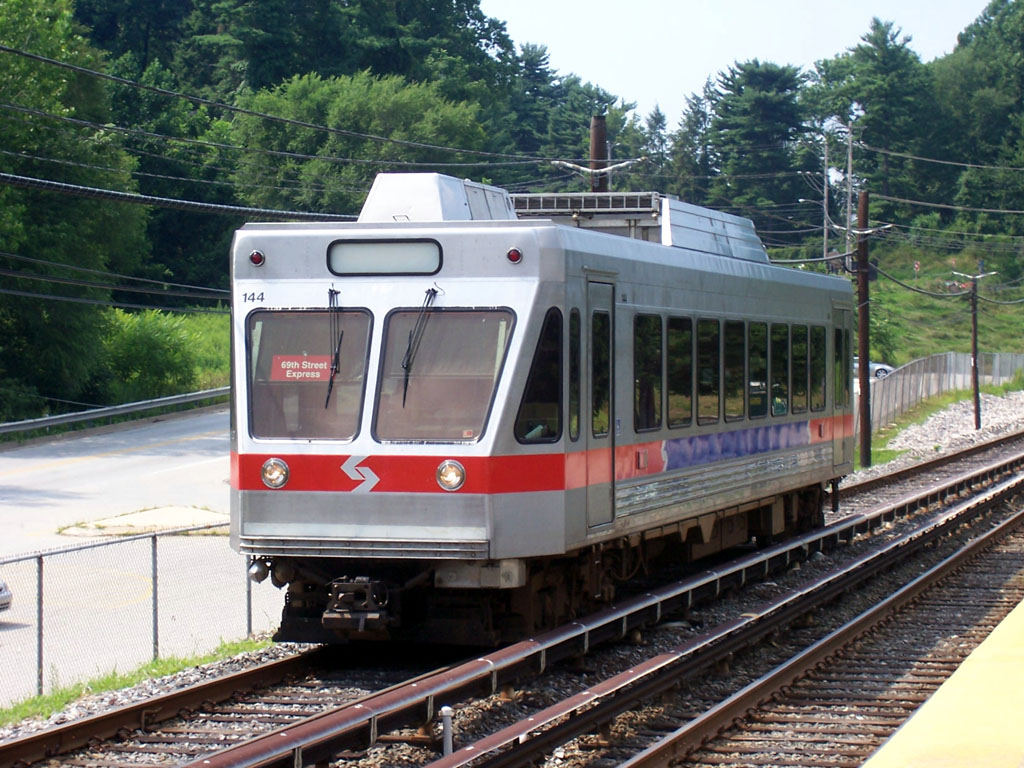
SEPTA Metro's M at the Gulph Mills station in Gulph Mills

The Victory District operates suburban bus and trolley or rail routes that are based at 69th Street Transportation Center in Upper Darby in Delaware County. Its rail routes comprise the M (formerly Norristown High Speed Line) that runs from 69th Street Transportation Center to Norristown Transportation Center and the D (formerly Routes 101 and 102). This district is the descendant of the Philadelphia Suburban Transportation Company, also known as the Red Arrow Lines. Some residents of the Victory District operating area still refer to this district as the "Red Arrow Division".

==== Frontier District ====
The Frontier District operates suburban bus routes that are based at the Norristown Transportation Center in Montgomery County and bus lines that serve eastern Bucks County. This district is the descendant of the Schuylkill Valley Lines in the Norristown area and the Trenton-Philadelphia Coach Lines in eastern Bucks County. SEPTA took over Schuylkill Valley Lines operations on March 1, 1976. SEPTA turned over the Bucks County routes (formerly Trenton-Philadelphia Coach Line Routes, a subsidiary of SEPTA) to Frontier Division in November 1983.

==== Suburban contract operations ====
Krapf Transit operated one bus line under contract to SEPTA in Chester County: Route 204 between Paoli Regional Rail Station and Eagleview. In 2025, SEPTA took over operation of this route. This route was operated from Krapf's own garage, located in West Chester, Pennsylvania.

Krapf has operated six other bus routes for SEPTA in the past. Route 202 (West Chester to Wilmington), Route 205 (Paoli Train Station to Chesterbrook), Route 207 (The Whiteland WHIRL), Route 208 (Strafford Train Station to Chesterbrook), Route 306 (Great Valley to Brandywine Towne Center) and Route 314 (West Chester to Goshen Corporate Park) are no longer operating.

SEPTA contracted bus operations before in Chester County. SEPTA and Reeder's Inc. joined forces in 1977 to operate three bus routes out of West Chester. These routes were Route 120 (West Chester to Coatesville), Route 121 (West Chester to Paoli), and Route 122 (West Chester to Oxford). Bus service between West Chester and Coatesville was a replacement for the previous trolley service operated by West Chester Traction.

SEPTA replaced two of the routes with their own bus service. Route 122 service was replaced by SEPTA's Route 91 in July 1982, after only one year of service. Route 91 was eliminated due to lack of ridership.

Route 121 was replaced by SEPTA's Route 92 in October 1982. This service continues to operate today. Since ridership on the Route 120 was strong it continued to operate under the operations of Reeder's Inc. even after SEPTA pulled the funding source. Krapf purchased the Reeder's operation in 1992 and designated the remaining (West Chester to Coatesville) bus route as Krapf Transit "Route A". SEPTA acquired the "A" Bus from Krapf's in August 2021 and rebranded it to Route 135.

Route 205 (Paoli Station to Chesterbrook) was formerly operated by Krapf until late 2019, when it was merged into SEPTA's own Route 206 (Paoli Station to Great Valley).

=== Railroad Division ===
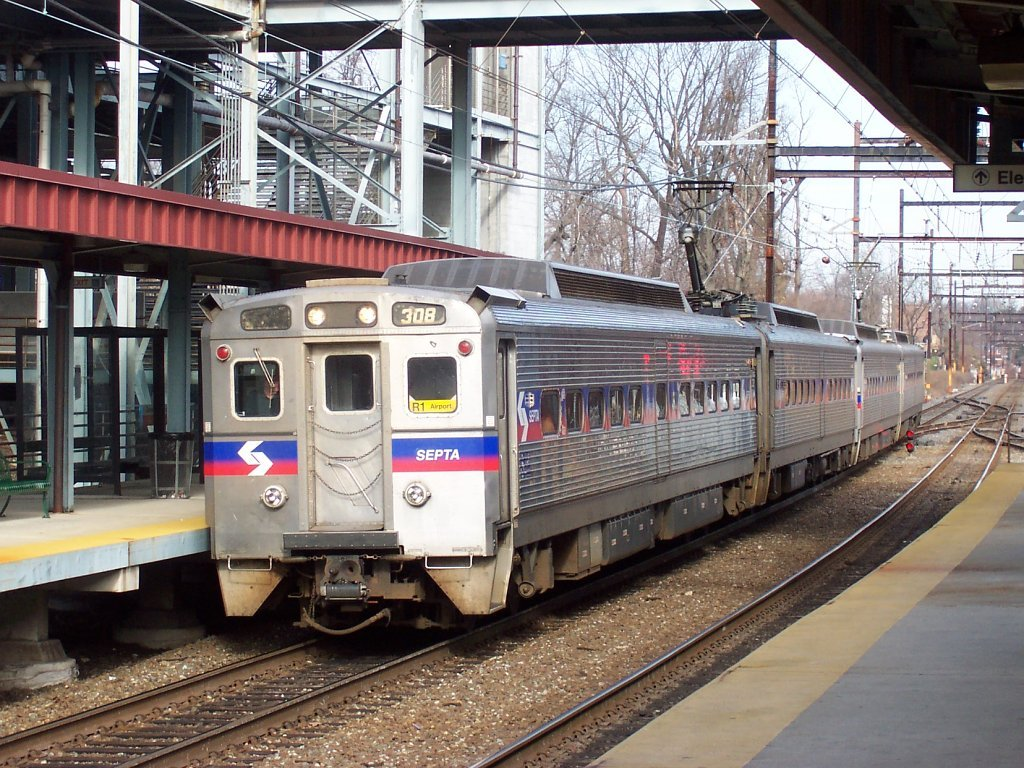
A SEPTA Silverliner IV at Fern Rock Transit Center in the Fern Rock section of Philadelphia

The Railroad Division operates 13 commuter railroad routes that begin in Center City Philadelphia and radiate outwards, terminating in intra-city, suburban and out-of-state locations.

This division is the descendant of the six electrified commuter lines of the Reading Company (RDG), the six electrified commuter lines of the Pennsylvania Railroad (PRR, later Penn Central: PC), and the new airport line constructed by the City of Philadelphia between 1974 and 1984.

With the construction and opening of the Center City Commuter Connection Tunnel in 1984, lines were paired such that a former Pennsylvania Railroad line was coupled with a former Reading line. Seven such pairings were created and given route designations numbered R1 through R8 (with R4 not used). As a result, the routes were originally designed so that trains would proceed from one outlying terminal to Center City, stopping at 30th Street Station, Suburban Station and Jefferson Station, formerly Market East Station, then proceed out to the other outlying terminal assigned to the route. Since ridership patterns have changed since the implementation of this plan, SEPTA removed the R-numbers from the lines in July 2010 and instead refers to the lines by the names of their termini.

The out-of-state terminals offer connections with other transit agencies. The Trenton Line offers connections in Trenton, New Jersey to NJ Transit (NJT) or Amtrak for travel to New York City. Plans exist to restore NJT service to West Trenton, New Jersey, thus offering a future alternate to New York via the West Trenton Line and NJT. Another plan offers a connection for travel to Baltimore and Washington, D.C. via MARC, involving extensions of the SEPTA Wilmington/Newark Line from Newark, Delaware, an extension of MARC's Penn service from Perryville, Maryland, or both.

=== SEPTA Access ===
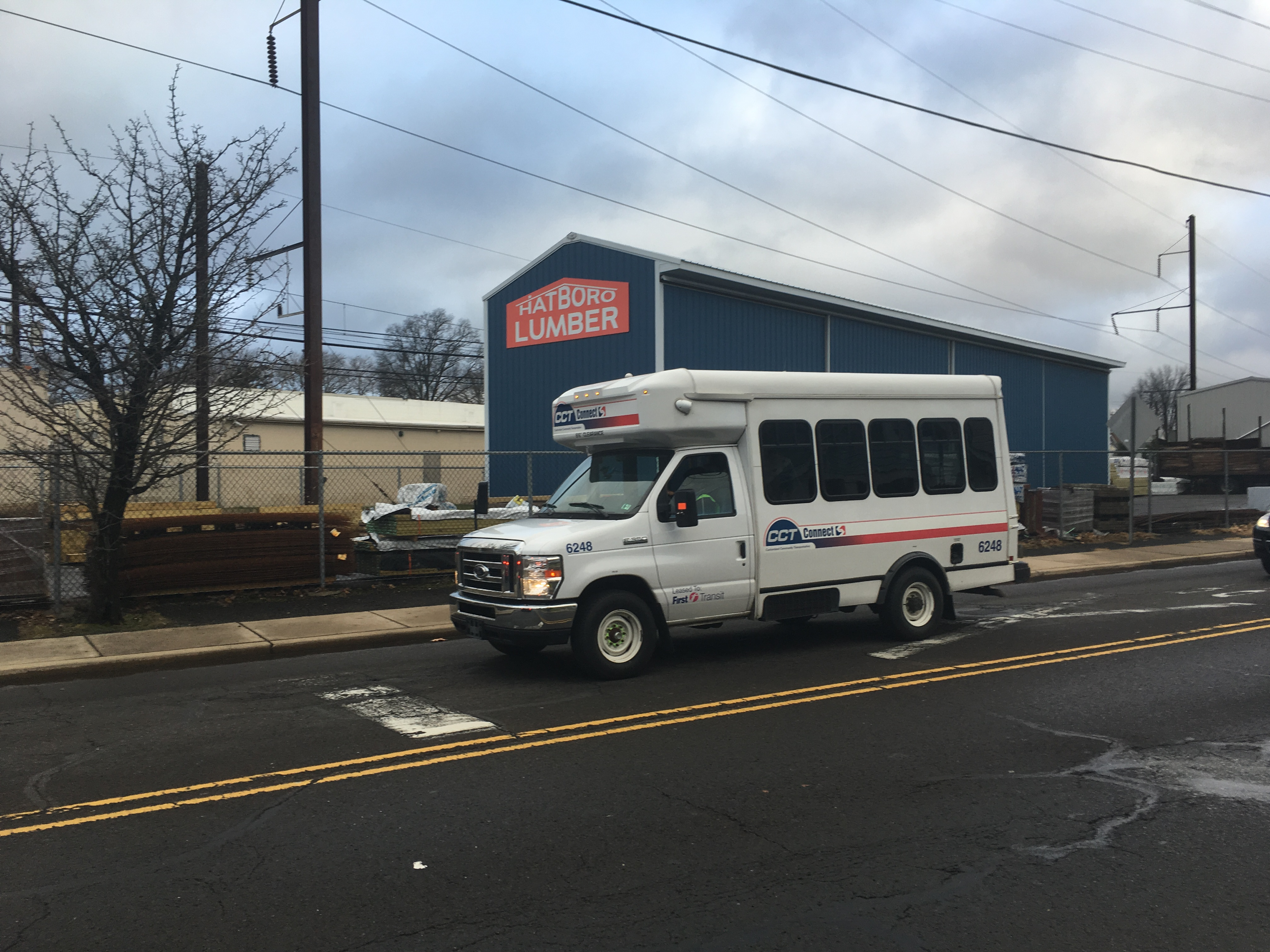
A SEPTA CCT Connect paratransit bus in Hatboro

SEPTA Access (formerly CCT Connect) is a paratransit service from SEPTA that offers a Shared-Ride Program for senior citizens and ADA Paratransit Service for people with disabilities. The Shared-Ride Program provides a door-to-door ridesharing service through advance reservations for senior citizens age 65 or older in the city of Philadelphia for travel within the city and to points within 3 miles (4.8 km) of the city's borders.

The ADA Paratransit Service provides door-to-door service through advance reservations for people with disabilities in accordance with the Americans with Disabilities Act (ADA), allowing for travel across the SEPTA service area within 3/4 mile (1.2 km) of fixed-route transit service when such service operates. SEPTA Access is operated by third-party contractors for SEPTA. The name was changed from CCT Connect to SEPTA Access on July 1, 2024 although vehicles will retain the former branding until further notice.

Easton Coach, First Transit, MV Transportation, and Total Transit Corp. operate SEPTA Access service in Philadelphia County; Easton Coach operates SEPTA Access service in Bucks County; Krapf Transit operates SEPTA Access service in Chester County; Community Transit of Delaware County operates SEPTA Access service in Delaware County; and First Transit operates SEPTA Access service in Montgomery County.

== Financing ==
SEPTA is not a non-profit and was created by the PA General Assembly. As an example, SEPTA does not file a form 990 with the IRS, as it is a state created authority. SEPTA gets income from passenger fares, investments, and multiple government agencies to cover operating costs.

=== Operating costs ===
SEPTA had $1,530,984,000 in total operating expenses for the fiscal year of 2021. $1,088,773,000 (71.1%) of those expenses are considered "Labor and Fringe Benefits". $331,432,000 (21.6%) of those expenses are "Material and Services" costs. $27,313,000 (1.8%) are due to "Propulsion Power" costs. $26,026,000 (1.7%) are due to "Fuel" costs. $24,711,000 (1.6%) are for "Injury and Damage Claims". $23,875,000 (1.6%) are due to "Depreciation/Contributed Capital" costs. The last $8,854,000 (.5%) in costs are due to "Vehicle and Facility Rentals".

=== Operating revenue ===
To cover 35% of their operating costs, SEPTA receives $541,768,000 in operating revenue, which includes: $480,574,000 (88.7%) from passenger revenue, $16,250,000 (3%) from SEPTA's "Shared Ride Program", $42,188,000 (7.8%) from "Other Income", and $2,756,000 (.5%) from "Investment Income".

=== Government funding ===
To make up for the $989,200,000 gap in operating expenses for FY2021, SEPTA receives 65% of its FY2021 income from federal, state, and local government funding. SEPTA receives this financial support in the form of direct funding, grants, income from a Pennsylvanian sales tax, proceeds from state bond programs, and lease funding.

$779,842,000 (78.8%) of SEPTA's funding short-fall is covered by a combination of state government funding. $111,986,000 (11.3%) of SEPTA's funding short-fall is covered by local government programs. $93,028,000 (9.4%) of SEPTA's funding short-fall is covered by the Federal government. $4,360,000 (.5%) of the gap is covered by "Other" means.

As of June 2022, SEPTA no longer receives $180,000,000 annually from the Pennsylvania Turnpike Commission as a result of Act 89, signed into law in 2013. Under Act 89, this funding became $50,000,000 for the 2023 fiscal year, and will eventually become nothing.

As of April 2025, SEPTA may need to cut many routes if the Pennsylvania State Senate does not vote to give SEPTA a higher budget for 2026.

On June 26, 2025, the SEPTA board voted to cut service and raise fares amid budget deficiencies. This means starting Sept. 1, the new fare for bus, metro and ParaTransit rides would be $2.90—tying SEPTA with New York City MTA's for the highest fare in the country. This would also eliminate 50 bus routes, cut five Regional Rail lines, reduce all remaining service by 20%, add a 9 p.m. curfew on metro and Regional Rail service, cancel special service (such as sports express trains), close 66 stations, and raise fares by 21.5%. On August 13, with the Pennsylvania state government continuing to negotiate over the future of the system's funding, Sauer said at a meeting of the Pennsylvania House of Representatives Rules Committee that the first round of service cuts would go ahead as scheduled. Sauer said SEPTA had needed clarity on funding by the 14th in order to pause the implementation of the cuts, which failed to materialize.

== Fares ==
Rides on SEPTA's transit services (buses, rapid transit, trolleys, and trackless trolleys) cost $2.90. This must be paid in exact change when using cash. Electronic payment methods allow transfers from one SEPTA transit service to another. This includes two free transfers. A number of interchanges between rapid transit lines can be used for free, without a transfer. Electronic payment methods previously offered rides for $2, but this was raised to match the cash base rate ($2.50) on December 1, 2024. On September 1, 2025, the base fare on all services increased to $2.90.

Fares on Regional Rail are based on fare zones reflecting the station's distance from Center City Philadelphia. Fares are higher on weekdays and lower during weekends and major holidays when paying with a SEPTA Key Card or a Quick Trip. Fares paid on board the train to the conductor are the same prices at all times. Until December 1, 2024, weekday evening fares were the same as weekend/holiday fares. SEPTA also offers intermediate fares for trips on Regional Rail that do not go through Center City Philadelphia and "via Center City Philadelphia" fares that can be used between two outlying stations that require travel through Center City Philadelphia. These fares were raised to present levels on September 1, 2025.

Fares for the SEPTA Access (formerly CCT Connect) cost $5.75.

=== Passes ===
Several types of passes are available that allow a certain number of trips on transit and/or Regional Rail for a specified amount of time. These passes are only available on a SEPTA Key card. Paper passes have been discontinued.

The TransPass costs $31 weekly and $116 monthly and can be used for all transit rides within the time period. The TransPass is valid on Regional Rail for riders traveling between Zone 1 and Center City stations or the Airport Line. The TransPass can be used anywhere on Regional Rail on weekends and major holidays.

The TrailPass is available either weekly or monthly and can be used on Regional Rail up to the zone printed on the pass along with all transit rides within the time period. Prices for the TrailPass are based on fare zones reflecting distance from Center City Philadelphia. TrailPasses have anywhere privileges on weekends and major holidays.

The Cross County Pass costs $38.50 weekly and $143.75 monthly and can be used for all transit rides and all Regional Rail trips outside Center City Philadelphia within the time period. The pass can be used with a payment of an additional Zone 1 fare for travel into Center City Philadelphia. Cross County Passes have anywhere privileges on weekends and holidays.

The One-Day Anywhere FleX Pass (formerly called the One-Day Independence Pass) can be used for up to 10 trips in one day on transit and Regional Rail services, with an individual pass $16.25 and a three-pass bundle $43.75. An additional charge of $5 per individual pass must be paid for Regional Rail travel in New Jersey.

The One-Day Neighborhood FleX Pass can be used on transit and Regional Rail, between Zone 2 and Center City Stations for 10 trips costing $12.50 for one day and $33.75 for a three-pass bundle. Additional surcharge applies to riders using the Neighborhood FleX Pass beyond Zone 2 stations on Regional Rail.

The One-Day Convenience Pass allows for 8 rides on transit services in one day for $7.50, while the Three-Day Convenience Pass allows for 24 rides on transit services in a 72-hour period for $19. The pass is not valid on Regional Rail.

SEPTA offers the SEPTA Key University Pass to college students at University of Pennsylvania, Temple University, Drexel University, and Saint Joseph's University. These passes can be monthly or semester-based, and allow 960 rides over the course of the semester; fares are discounted by approximately 10 percent.

=== Reduced fares ===
SEPTA allows senior citizens to apply for Senior Fare Cards. This allows them to ride transit services and Regional Rail trains in Pennsylvania for free with identification; fares on Regional Rail trains operating to Delaware or New Jersey are half the weekday fare. Disabled persons may apply for a Reduced Fare Card. This allows them to ride transit services for half price and Regional Rail trains for half the weekday fare with identification.

SEPTA allows all children under the age of 12 to ride for free with a fare-paying adult. Children riding alone must pay regular fares. SEPTA offers special fares for students in K–12 schools who ride SEPTA to get to school. The SEPTA Key Student Fare Card program provides students with a SEPTA Key card that can be used for up to 8 trips per school day, between 5:30 AM and 8:00 PM. Cards can be used on all SEPTA services, including Regional Rail.

SEPTA is currently partnering with the City of Philadelphia on running Zero Fare, a 2-year pilot program that will allow residents who live near or below the Poverty threshold to ride all services for free. Riders cannot apply on their own. 90% of them will be selected randomly based on age and income, and the remaining 10% will be enrolled through a number of community organizations. SEPTA reported positive results at the end of the first year of the program, during which 24,000 Zero Fare Key Cards were distributed. During the second year, SEPTA plans to distribute a further 20,000 cards by June 30, 2025.

== Payment methods ==
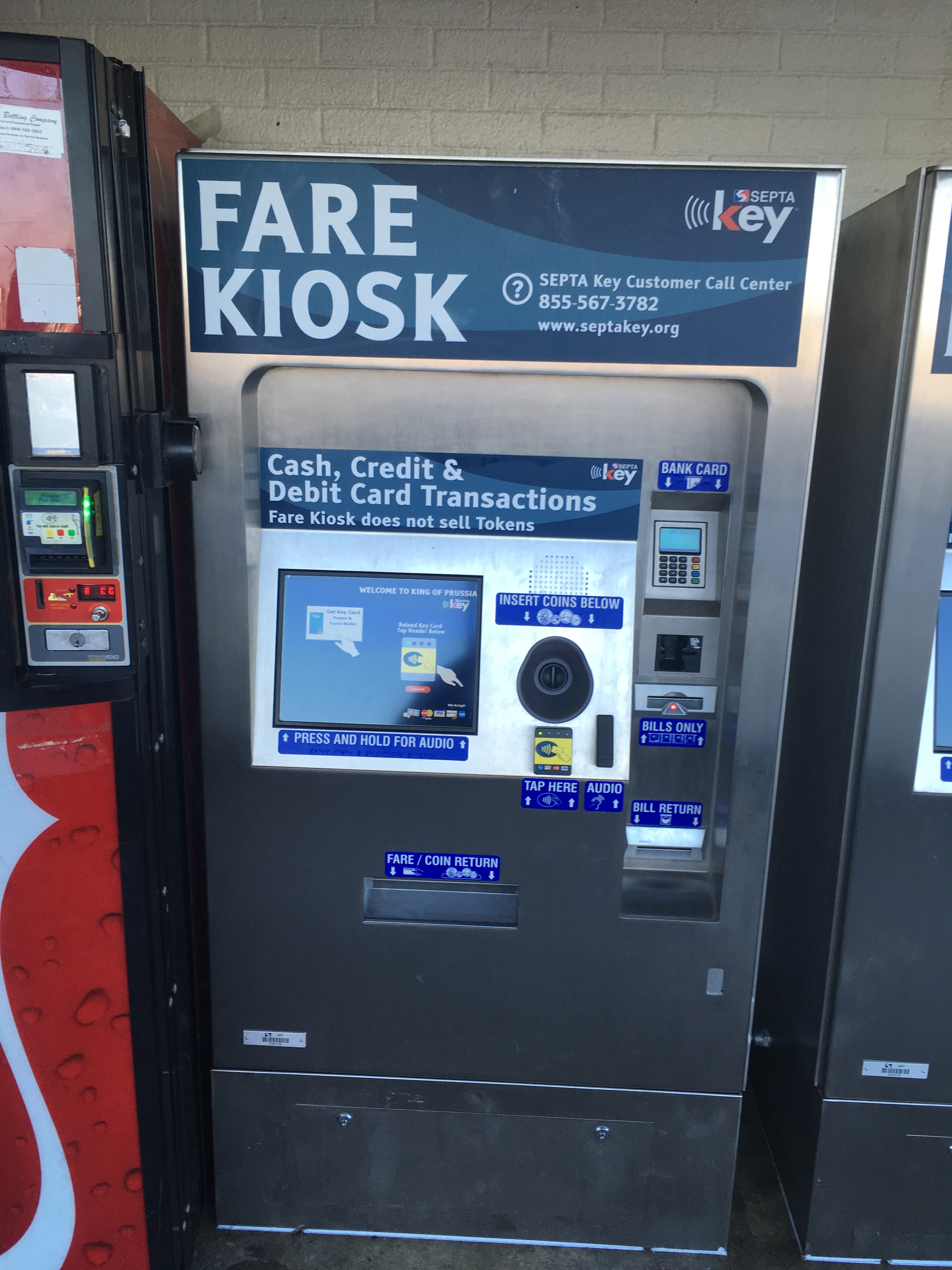
The SEPTA key fare kiosk at the King of Prussia Transit Center in King of Prussia

SEPTA stations and vehicles are equipped with turnstiles, scanners, and fare boxes that accept various types of payment methods depending on the mode of transit: SEPTA Key, Key Tix (transit only), Quick Trips (transit station turnstiles, from Center City Regional Rail Stations, and the Airport Line), cash (buses, trolleys, and trolleybuses only), and NFC. Fares on Regional Rail can be paid to a conductor onboard the train using cash or a credit card; these fares are more expensive than those purchased using a SEPTA Key card.

SEPTA stations have Fare Kiosks that can be used to purchase Key cards and Quick Trips, and also replenish the Travel Wallet.

=== SEPTA Key ===
The SEPTA Key card is a smart card that can be used on SEPTA's transit services and Regional Rail. The card replaced tokens, paper tickets, and paper passes; it is now the preferred method of payment on SEPTA services. In addition to storing passes, the card has a travel wallet that can be reloaded online, at kiosks, SEPTA Sales Offices, and participating retailers. Reduced fare cards issued to the elderly and the disabled are special cards that are printed with photo ID.

=== Key Tix ===
In August 2022, SEPTA introduced the ability to pay for transit rides using electronic tickets that can be bought through the SEPTA mobile apps for Android and iOS. Once a ticket is activated, the app displays a QR code that can be read at scanners and turnstiles. In addition to allowing discounted rides and free transfers, multiple passengers can use the same ticket. After a limited pilot program, the feature was released to the general public in December 2022.

On March 2nd, 2026, SEPTA discontinued Key Tix, and as of August 28th, 2026, is no longer accepted.

=== Quick Trip ===
Quick Trips are magnetic strip cards that can be used for a single ride from transit stations with turnstiles, Center City Regional Rail Stations, or the Airport Line. They can be purchased at Fare Kiosks and cost $2.90 for transit and the price varies by zone and time of day on Regional Rail. They do not allow free transfers, except at free interchange stations in Center City at the 13th, 15th, and Drexel at 30th Street Stations.

=== NFC Payments ===
In July 2023, SEPTA launched a limited pilot program to allow passengers to pay for transit trips using contactless credit cards and digital wallets on NFC-enabled phones and smart watches. This feature was made available to the general public for transit rides on September 29, 2023. Availability on Regional Rail was originally planned for 2024. SEPTA began a limited pilot program to test this in December 2024. The feature was made generally available on April 4, 2025 (excluding Trenton and West Trenton stations). This made SEPTA the first agency in the US to offer contactless payments on commuter rail.

=== PATCO Freedom Card ===
The Freedom Share Card fare card used by the PATCO Speedline is accepted on all SEPTA services except Regional Rail. The card is read at SEPTA Key card readers.

=== Paper Tickets ===
Paper tickets were used on Regional Rail. Sales were discontinued in 2020. Valid tickets were still accepted on trains until April 1, 2021. As of April 2, 2021, previously purchased paper tickets were no longer accepted on Regional Rail.

=== Tokens ===
SEPTA tokens could be used on transit services for discounted fares. Each token cost $2, and they could only be purchased in packs of 2, 5, or 10. The usage of tokens predates the formation of SEPTA, having been employed by various transit agencies since the 1880s. Philadelphia was the last major US city to utilize tokens for transit fare payments. Token sales were discontinued on April 30, 2018, and the token vending machines were removed from transit stations. Previously sold tokens could be redeemed at fare kiosks and their value could be loaded onto the Travel Wallet of the SEPTA Key card. Effective January 1, 2024, SEPTA no longer accepts tokens at vehicle fareboxes or fare kiosks.

== Transit police ==
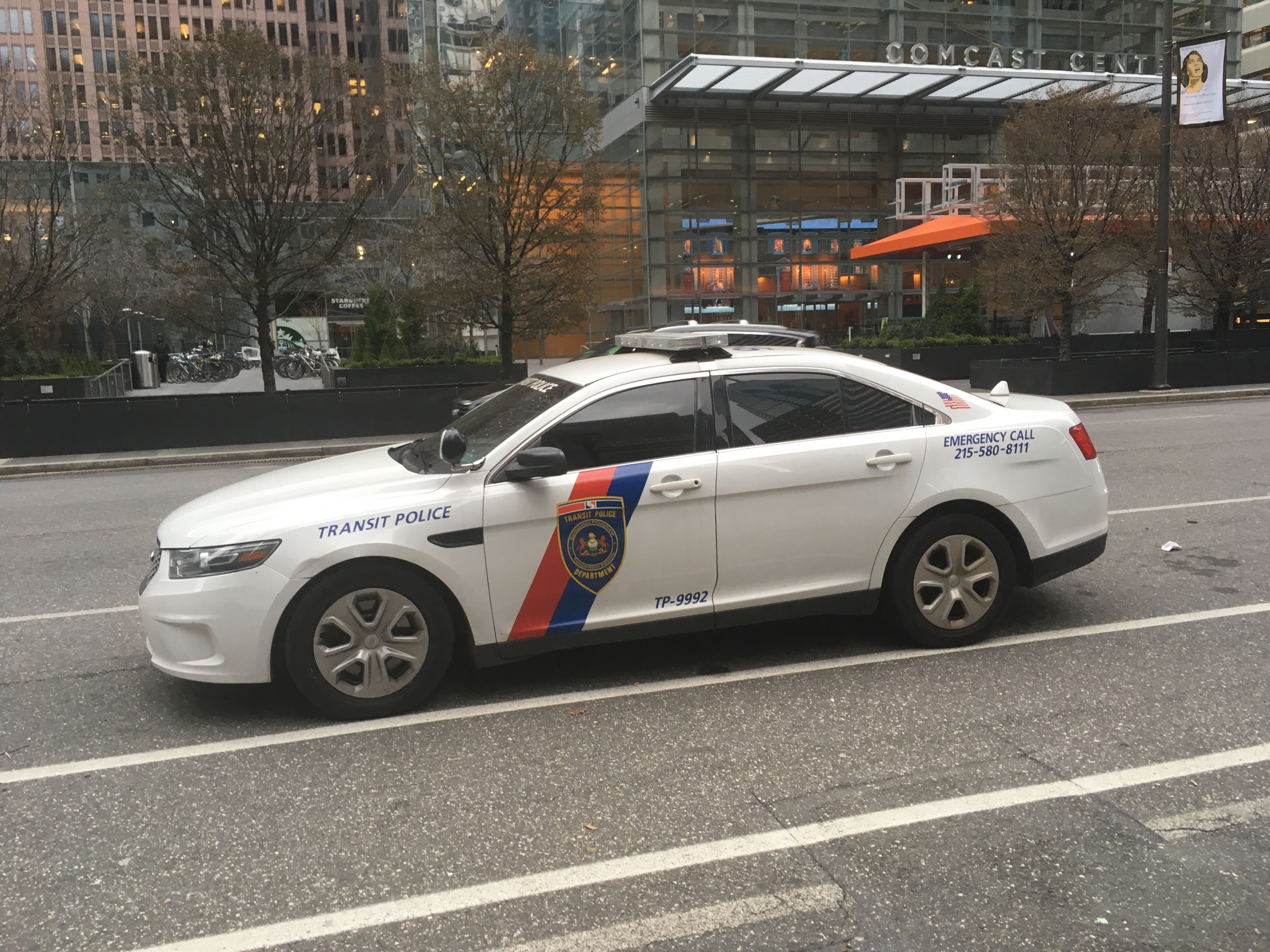
A SEPTA Transit Police car in Center City Philadelphia

SEPTA established its current Transit Police Department in 1981. It now has about 260 officers operating in seven patrol zones. It maintains a patrol, bicycle, and police dog unit, and a Special Operations Response Team trained to deal with potential hostage situations. In May 2023, Charles Lawson was appointed chief of the Transit Police, after serving as acting chief since July 2022.

== Equipment ==
=== Buses ===
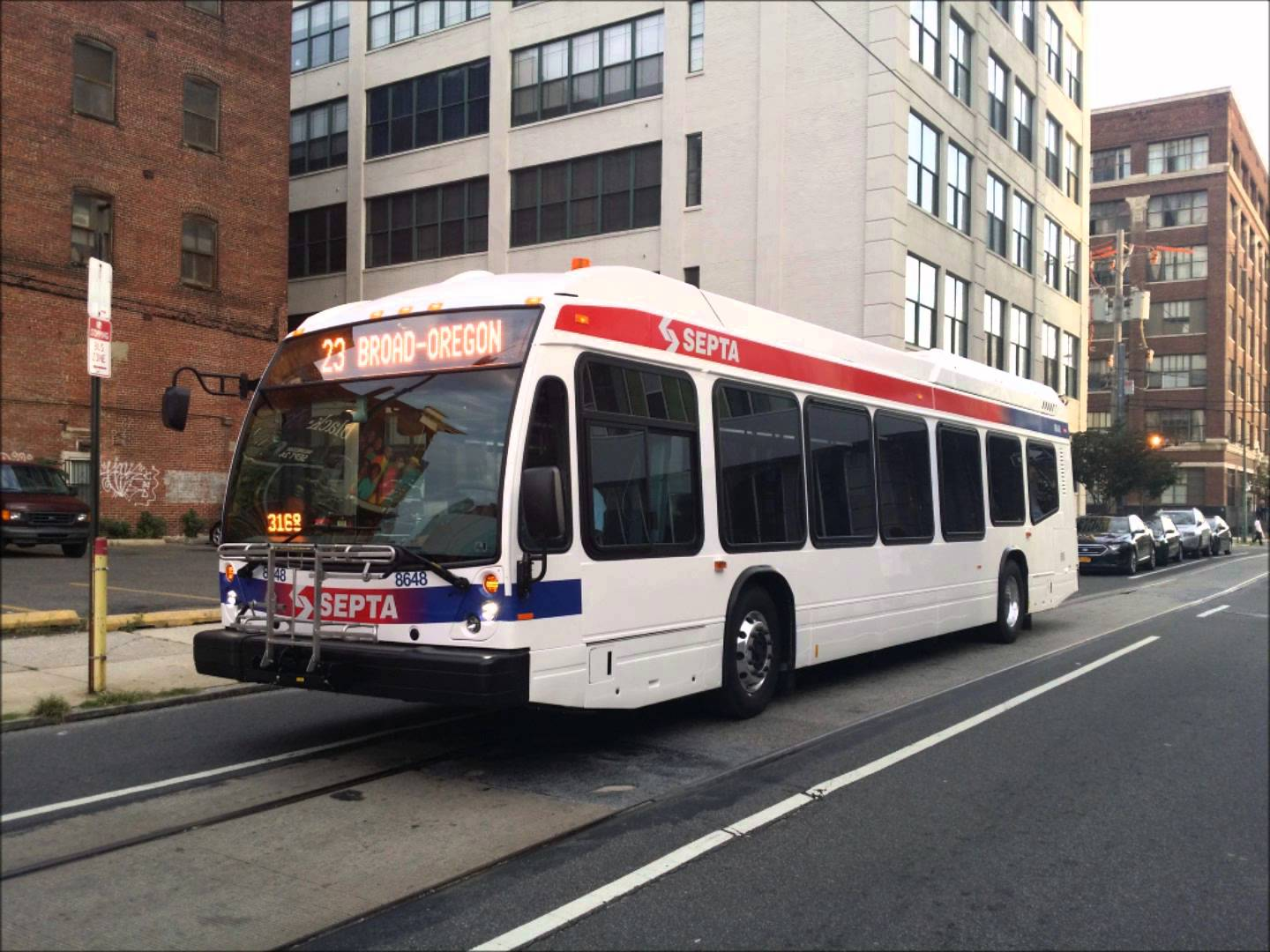
A SEPTA Nova Bus, 2016

In 1982, SEPTA ordered buses from Neoplan USA, a purchase that was both the largest for Neoplan at the time and SEPTA's largest to date. These buses were used throughout the SEPTA service area. SEPTA changed its specifications on new bus orders each year. The Neoplan AK's (numbered 8285–8410), which was SEPTA's first Neoplan order, had longitudinal seating: all of the seats face towards the aisle. Their suburban counterparts (8411–8434) had longitudinal seating only in the rear of the bus. The back door has a wheelchair ramp, which forced SEPTA officials to limit its use and specify wheelchair lifts in their next order. These buses had a nine-liter 6v92 engine and Allison HT-747 transmission.

In 1983, SEPTA, along with other transit operators in Pennsylvania, ordered 1,000 Neoplan buses of various lengths. SEPTA ultimately received 450 buses from this order: 425 were 40-foot (12 m) buses (BD 8435–8584 and CD 8601–8875), which came without wheelchair lifts, and 25 35-foot (11 m) buses (BP 1301–1325).

SEPTA purchased additional Neoplans in 1986. The first two groups (3000–3131 and 3132–3251) came without rear wheelchair lifts; the last two groups, one in late 1987 (3252–3371) and another in 1989 (3372–3491), included them. All Neoplans built between 1986 and 1989 were equipped with a ZF 4HP-590 transmission.

By the early 1990s, SEPTA had 1,092 Neoplan AN440 coaches in active service, making it the largest transit system in North America with a fleet primarily manufactured by Neoplan USA. These buses dominated the streets of Philadelphia through late 1997 when the earlier fleet of AK and BD Neoplans (8285–8581) was replaced by 400 buses built by American Ikarus and – the same company after a 1996 reorganization – North American Bus Industries. The older GMC RTS 35- and 40-foot buses were also replaced in this order, with the sole remaining exception of No. 4462, a 35-foot coach. More replacements occurred when SEPTA received its first low-floor fleet and retired the last AN440 buses on June 20, 2008.

The Neoplan model had not entirely vanished from Philadelphia's streets by the start of the 21st century. In 1998, SEPTA ordered 155 articulated buses from the company. These buses replaced the 50 1984 Volvo 10BM 60-foot articulated buses. These buses have now been retired since late 2015, replaced by the 2013–2016 NovaBus LFSA HEV.

The 1998 purchase included 80 29-foot Transmark RE-29 buses from National-Eldorado (4501–4580, 4581 received later to replace fire damaged 4539), the first of which began to arrive in late 2000. Most of these buses ran on suburban routes occasionally entering the city, but some were in the "LUCY" service in the University City section of West Philadelphia, in a special paint scheme, and others on lighter lines within Philadelphia. SEPTA had decided to buy from Metrotrans Legacy, SEPTA's first choice in small buses, but the company filed for bankruptcy in 2000.

A fleet of buses known as "cutaways" were purchased. These buses were built on Ford van chassis, with bodies similar to those seen on car rental shuttles at various airports. These buses were retired around 2003 and replaced with slightly larger cutaway buses on a Freightliner truck chassis.

After evaluating sample buses from New Flyer and NovaBus in 1994–96, SEPTA ordered 100 low-floor buses (nos. 5401–5500) from New Flyer in 2001.

Trackless trolley (trolley bus) service was suspended in 2003 and the 110 AM General vehicles that had provided service on SEPTA's five trackless trolley routes never returned to service. In early 2006, SEPTA ordered 38 new low-floor trackless trolleys from New Flyer (numbered 800-837), which entered service in 2008, restoring trackless service on routes 59, 66 and 75. These buses replaced SEPTA Neoplan EZs, ending Neoplan's 26-year domination.

SEPTA placed an order with delivery starting in 2008 for 400 New Flyer hybrid buses—with options for up to 80 additional buses to replace the NABI Ikarus buses at the end of their 12-year life. These will not be the first hybrid buses, since SEPTA purchased two small groups of hybrids, 5601H–5612H, which arrived in 2003, and 5831H–5850H in 2004.

Prior to the 2008 purchase, SEPTA borrowed an MTA New York City Transit Orion VII hybrid bus, #6365, to evaluate it in service.

SEPTA was the first to purchase New Flyer DE40LFs equipped with rooftop HVAC units.

SEPTA delivered 525 2017–2022 NFI XDE40 hybrid buses to replace all the diesel buses that were delivered between 2001 and 2004.

SEPTA is replacing cloth seats with plastic seats on their buses that were delivered after 2008 in an effort to combat bed bug infestations. This was completed in March 2020.

SEPTA's revenue from advertisements on the backs of its buses leads the authority to order mainly buses equipped with a rooftop HVAC, and with their rear route-number sign mounted on the roof, especially on 2008–2009 New Flyer DE40LFs and future orders.

In 2016, SEPTA launched a pilot program that would see battery electric buses replace diesel buses on former trackless trolley routes 29 and 79. Using a $2.6-million Federal Transit Administration grant, the agency ordered 25 such buses from Proterra, Inc. of California, together with two overhead fast-charging stations. They were expected to enter service in 2017, returning electric propulsion to these routes after nearly 15 years of diesel operation. These same buses were sidelined in February, 2020 for an undisclosed reason, but multiple agency sources blamed a defect in the buses' plastic chassis that led to a cracking problem.

In 2021, SEPTA placed an order for 220 New Flyer XDE40 buses with an option for 120 additional buses. These buses replaced the New Flyer D40LF buses that were delivered in 2005 and have also replaced the New Flyer DE40LF buses that were delivered between 2008-2009.

Model	Thumbnail	Propulsion	Length	Year	Fleet Series (Qty.)	Notes
New Flyer E40LFR	alt3=On the roof of the trackless trolley two poles rise up to contact overhead wires.	Electric trolleybus	40 ft (12 m)	2007-2008	800-837 (38)	
New Flyer DE40LFR		Diesel-electric hybrid	40 ft (12 m)	2010	8340-8459 (54 currently in service)	Units 8341-8343, 8345-8349, 8351-8355 8357-8358, 8360-8361 8363-8370 8378, 8380-8396, 8398, 8401, 8418-8420, 8423, 8425-8427, 8429-8430, 8432, and 8454 are retired.
New Flyer DE40LFR		Diesel-electric hybrid	40 ft (12 m)	2011	8460-8559 (93 currently in service)	Units 8473, 8477, 8496, 8509, 8514, 8536, and 8547 are retired.
Nova Bus LFSA HEV		Diesel-electric hybrid	62 ft (18.9 m)	2013-2016	7300-7484 (185)	
Nova Bus LFS HEV		Diesel-electric hybrid	40 ft (12 m)	2014	8600-8689 (90)	
New Flyer MiDi		Diesel	30 ft (9.1 m)	2016	4600-4634 (35)	
New Flyer XDE40		Diesel-electric hybrid	40 ft (12 m)	2016-2017	3000-3089 (90)	
New Flyer XDE40		Diesel-electric hybrid	40 ft (12 m)	2018	3090-3194 (105)	
New Flyer XDE40		Diesel-electric hybrid	40 ft (12 m)	2019	3195-3294 (100)	
New Flyer XDE40		Diesel-electric hybrid	40 ft (12 m)	2019–2020	3295-3409 (115)	
New Flyer XDE40		Diesel-electric hybrid	40 ft (12 m)	2020–2021	3410-3524 (115)	
New Flyer XDE40		Diesel-electric hybrid	40 ft (12 m)	2022–2024	3525-3744 (220)	
New Flyer XDE40		Diesel-electric hybrid	40 ft (12 m)	2025	3745-3864 (120)	
New Flyer XHE40		Hydrogen Fuel Cell	40 ft (12 m)	2024	700-709 (10)	

=== Rapid transit ===
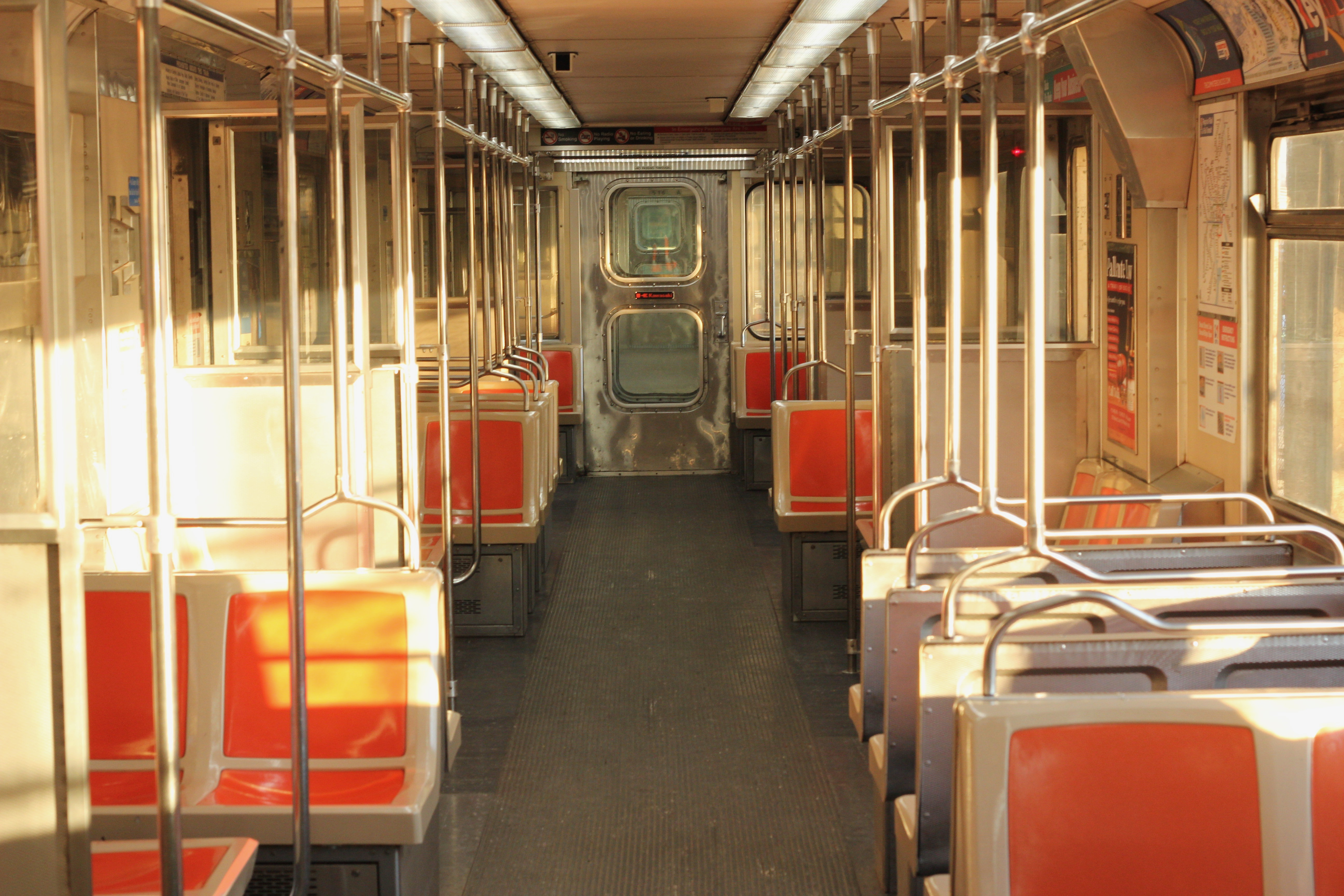
The interior of a Broad Street Line train

The Broad Street Line uses cars built by Kawasaki between 1982 and 1984. These cars, known as B-IV as they are the fourth generation used on the line, are stainless steel and include some cars with operating cabs at both ends, as well as some with only a single cab. These cars use the standard gauge of 4 ft 8 1/2 in (1,435 mm).

The Market–Frankford Line uses a class of cars known as M-4, as they, like the Broad Street B-IVs, represent the line's fourth generation of cars and were built from 1997 to 1999 by Adtranz. These cars use a broad gauge of 5 ft 2 1/2 in (1,588 mm), known as "Pennsylvania trolley gauge". In 2017, 90 cars had emergency welding to fix cracking steel beams. Then in 2020 all the cars, including the ones temporarily repaired in 2017, had to have more permanent welding to fix cracking steel beams.

=== Light rail/Streetcar ===
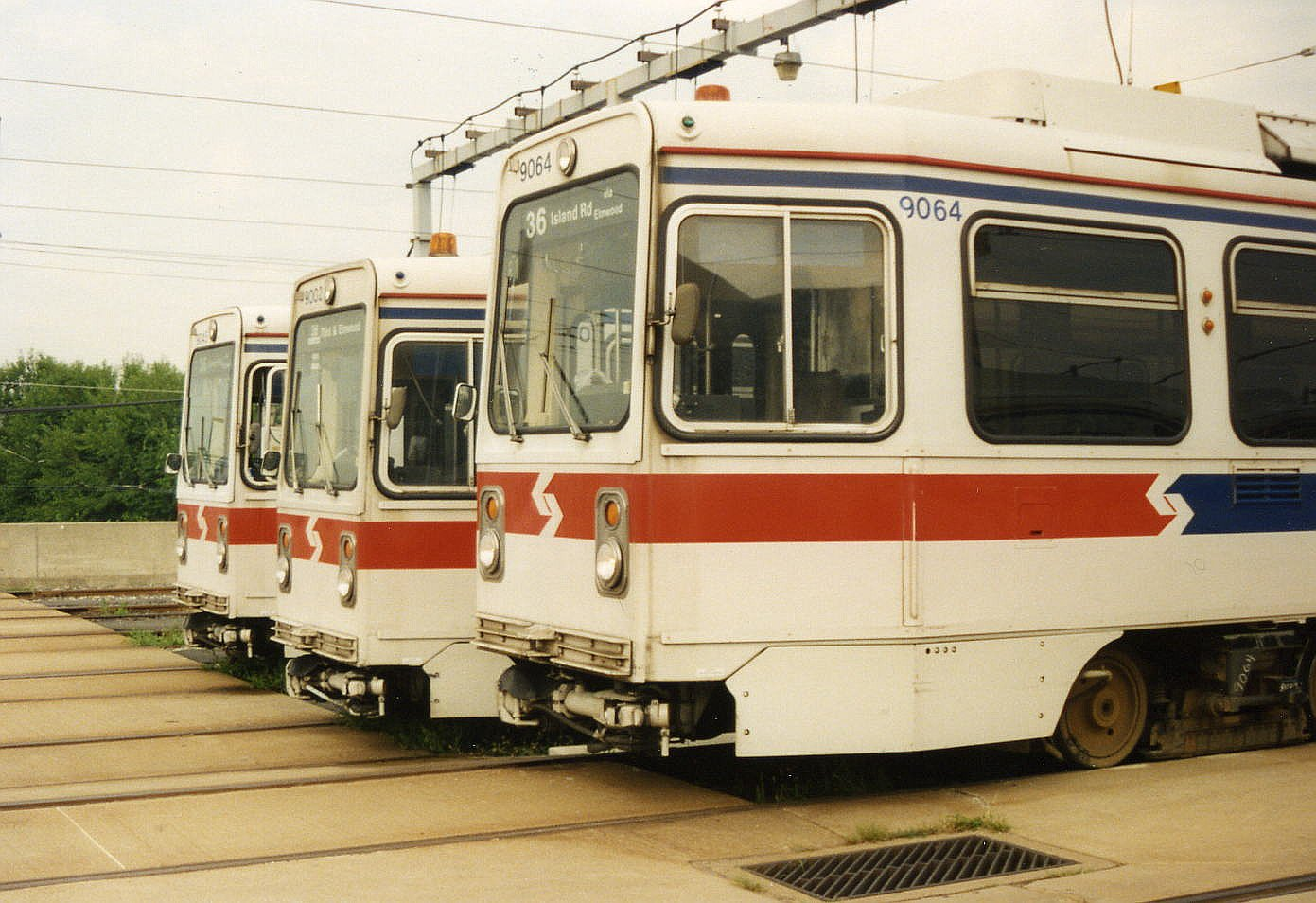
A SEPTA single-end Kawasaki LRV in the maintenance yard in 1993

The SEPTA LRV fleet has three different types of cars.

The 112 vehicles used on the T (T1, T2, T3, T4, and T5) were built by Kawasaki beginning in 1981 after a 1980 prototype was delivered and tested. Known as "K-cars", they use the 5 ft 2 1/2 in (1,588 mm) Pennsylvania trolley gauge. Larger than the replaced PCC cars they are 50 feet long and capable of reaching a top speed of 40 miles per hour (64 km/h). They also were the first in North America to have unitized roof-mounted air conditioners and to have electronic control of switches at junctions. The city cars operate out of two depots, Elmwood and Callowhill.

The D (D1 and D2) use 29 Kawasaki-built vehicles similar to, but slightly larger than, the T LRVs. They use a slightly wider wheel profile than the city lines, but the same wheel gauge 5 ft 2 1/2 in (1,588 mm). Wheel profiles are different and different gear ratios provide higher speeds. Notably, they are double-ended, unlike the T LRVs, as these lines lack any loops to turn the vehicles at their suburban terminals. Unlike the city cars, which use traditional trolley pole power collectors, the suburban cars use pantographs and are capable of a top speed of 50 miles per hour (80 km/h).

The G uses PCC cars. These cars were originally built in 1947 by the St. Louis Car Company and were rebuilt by Brookville (and renamed PCC II) for the line's reopening in 2003 to include air conditioning and a wheelchair lift. The G has the same 5 ft 2 1/2 in (1,588 mm) Pennsylvania trolley gauge as the T and operates out of Callowhill Depot. Since 2020, these cars are once again being rebuilt by SEPTA and when scheduled to return in 2023, they will feature plastic seating.

Currently, SEPTA is ordering new 130 low floor streetcars that will be built and delivered by Alstom. These LRVs are scheduled to enter service between 2027-2030. These cars will operate on the T, G, and D.

=== Regional Rail ===
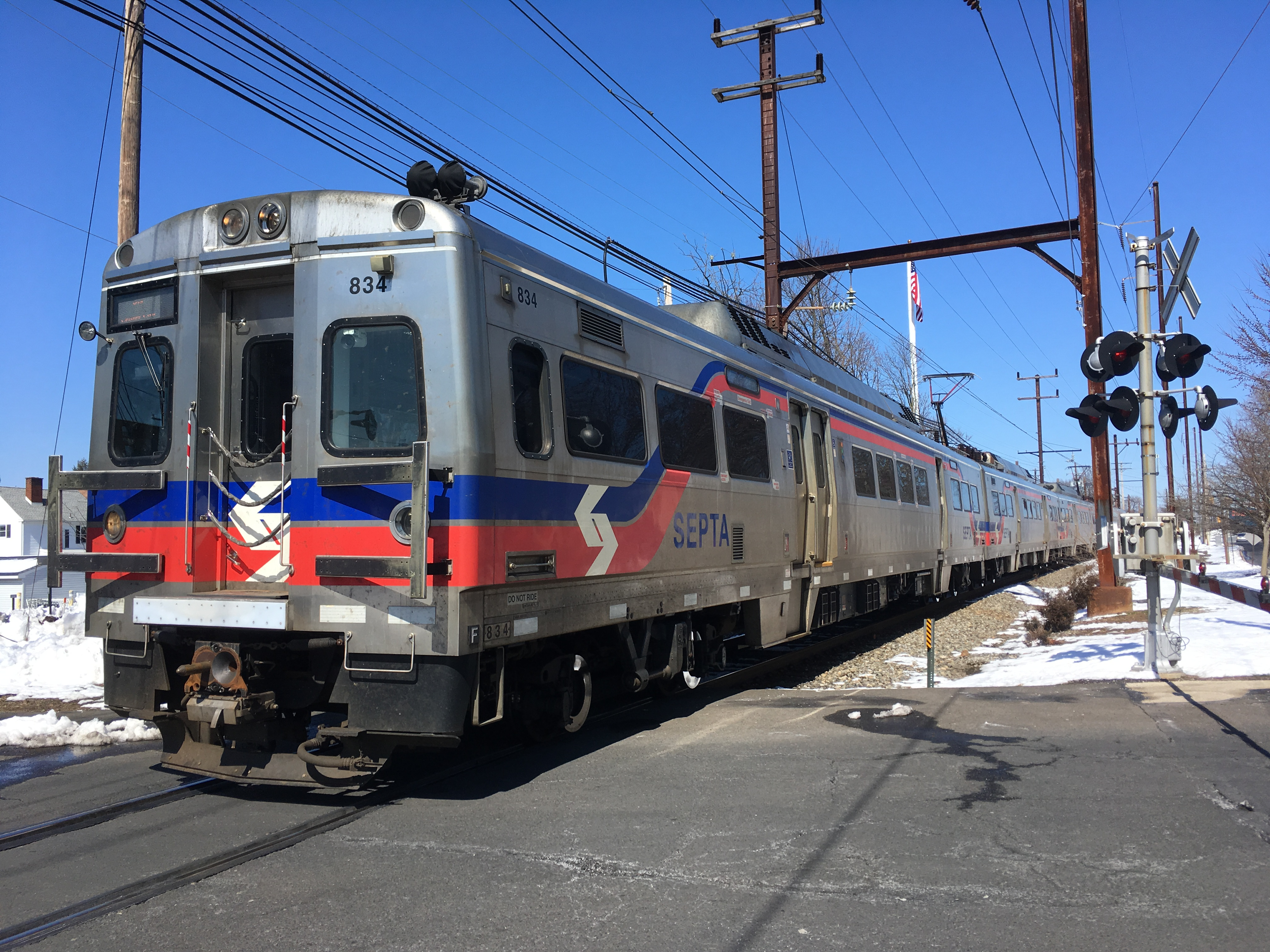
SEPTA's Silverliner V approaching the Hatboro station

SEPTA's regional rail services primarily use a fleet of "Silverliner" electric multiple unit cars. During rush-hour service they are supplemented by a small fleet of unpowered passenger cars, based on the "Comet" family of railcars, hauled by 15 Siemens ACS-64 electric locomotives.

=== Light metro ===
The M uses a unique class of 26 cars known as N-5s. They were delivered in 1993 by ABB after significant production difficulties and a change of assembly locations. These cars are powered by a nominally 700 volt top-contact third rail. They run on a standard gauge track. They are the first fleet of cars in North America to have Alternating Current (AC) traction motors.

They have running gear (trucks) incorporating design elements used on the Swedish High-Speed trains. Axle suspensions provide flexibility that allows axles to steer themselves around curves as small as 5 degrees. While the vehicles were designed for a top speed of 80 miles per hour (130 km/h), the signal system originally allowed operations at up to 70 miles per hour (110 km/h), but subsequent issues have had that lowered to 55 miles per hour (89 km/h).

=== Accessibility ===
All of SEPTA's buses are fully accessible under the requirements of the Americans with Disabilities Act (ADA). As of February 2022, about 46% of its subway and commuter rail stations combined are ADA-compliant, which is the second-lowest accessibility rate for rail stops in the country. The New York City Subway, at 28% as of September 2021, has the lowest in the nation.

The trolley vehicles are fully inaccessible, except for the PCCIIIs, meaning that no suburban trolley stop can possibly be compliant with the ADA. SEPTA was sued successfully over its lack of accessibility back in 2009.

== Maintenance facilities ==
Transit Divisions

- 69th Street Yard (City Transit Division / L in Delaware County)
- Allegheny Depot (City Transit Division / articulated and standard size buses; formerly housed Nearside, double-ended, and PCC streetcars)
- Berridge Shops (formerly Wyoming Shops, bus maintenance, and overhauls)
- Bridge Street Yard (City Transit Division / Market–Frankford Line)
- Callowhill Depot (City Transit Division / bus and streetcar; formerly housed Nearside, Peter Witt, double-ended, and PCC streetcars) – located in West Philadelphia, it was built in 1913 by the Philadelphia Rapid Transit Company (PRT) and was later operated by the Philadelphia Transportation Company (PTC) before being taken over by SEPTA.
- Comly Depot (City Transit Division / articulated and standard size buses)
- Elmwood Depot (City Transit Division / streetcar, also used as a station. Replaced former Woodland Depot)
- Fern Rock Yard (City Transit Division / Broad Street Line)
- Frankford Depot (City Transit Division / bus and trackless trolley; formerly housed Nearside, double-ended, and PCC streetcars)
- Frontier Depot (Suburban Transit Division / bus)
- Germantown Brakes Maintenance Facility (Germantown Depot, City Transit Division / bus maintenance)
- Midvale Depot (City Transit Division / articulated, standard size, and formerly housed 30-foot (9.1 m) buses. Replaced former Luzerne Depot)
- Southern Depot (City Transit Division / articulated and standard size buses: SEPTA board voted to not have trackless trolleys return to South Philly; formerly housed Nearside, double-ended and Peter Witt streetcars)
- Victory Depot (69th Street, Suburban Transit Division / bus and light rail)
- Woodland Maintenance Facility (streetcar overhaul and repairs. Site of former Woodland Depot, which formerly housed Nearside, double-ended, and PCC streetcars)

Regional Rail

== Connecting transit agencies in the Philadelphia region ==
=== Local services ===
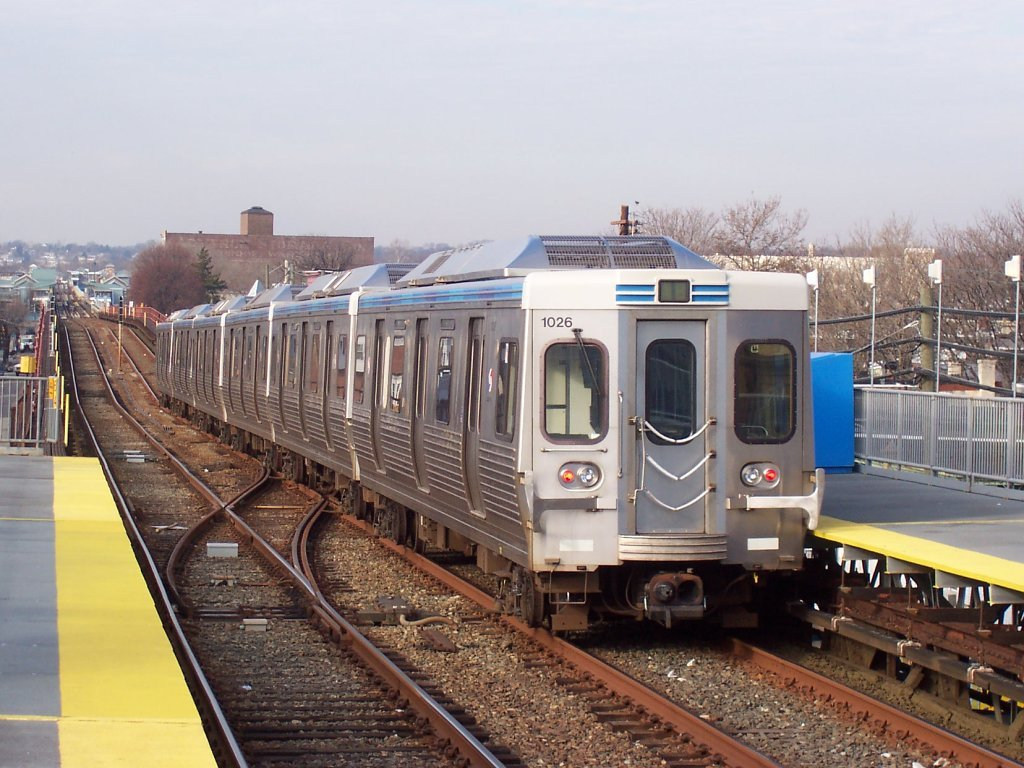
A SEPTA ADTranz M-4 at the 52nd Street Station

The PATCO Speedline is a rapid transit line that runs from Center City Philadelphia to Camden, New Jersey and terminates in Lindenwold, New Jersey. At the 8th Street station, passengers can transfer to the Market–Frankford Line and Broad–Ridge Spur with an additional transfer fare. Paid transfers are also available at PATCO's 12th–13th Street station and 15th–16th Street station with SEPTA's Broad Street Line Walnut–Locust station. The PATCO Speedline crosses over the Delaware River via the Ben Franklin Bridge. It is owned by the Delaware River Port Authority.

In the western Philadelphia suburbs, Krapf's Transit runs regularly scheduled buses for the TMACC between Coatesville and Parkesburg and between West Chester and Oxford. Krapf's also provides contract services to SEPTA on route 204. They also operate a free express shuttle bus from Center City to the Navy Yard in South Philadelphia as well as a free shuttle bus loop within the Navy Yard itself.

In King of Prussia, the Greater Valley Forge Transportation Management Association runs a community shuttle, the Rambler, which connects with SEPTA at the King of Prussia Transit Center.

In the northwestern Philadelphia suburbs, Pottstown Area Rapid Transit (PART) operates five bus routes in Pottstown and the neighboring townships of Douglass, Limerick, Lower Pottsgrove, Upper Pottsgrove, and West Pottsgrove in Montgomery County and North Coventry Township in Chester County. PART and SEPTA have an agreement allowing transfers between PART service and SEPTA Route 93 buses in Pottstown.

=== Regional services ===
NJ Transit runs buses from Philadelphia to various New Jersey points. Many NJT buses stop at the Philadelphia Greyhound Terminal, which is immediately north of Jefferson Station or at other locations in Center City Philadelphia. NJT also operates the River Line light rail line between Camden and Trenton, the Northeast Corridor Line between Trenton and New York, and the Atlantic City Line between 30th Street Station and Atlantic City. Both the Northeast Corridor Line and River Line connect with SEPTA's Regional Rail Trenton Line at the Trenton Transit Center. SEPTA Route 127 connects with NJT bus and rail services here also.

DART First State provides bus service in Delaware. This service connects with SEPTA's Wilmington/Newark Line Regional Rail service in Wilmington, Delaware, and Newark, Delaware. In 2007, SEPTA bus Route 306 began service, connecting the Great Valley Corporate Center and West Chester with the Brandywine Town Center; service between West Chester and Brandywine Town Center was discontinued in 2010 due to low ridership. In February 2009, SEPTA bus Route 113 commenced connecting bus service with DART at the Tri-State Mall, allowing service between Delaware County and Delaware, and connecting with DART First State's #13 and #61 bus at the Tri-State Mall. The transfer point at the Tri-State Mall was moved in 2023 to the Claymont Transportation Center.

=== National and international services ===
Amtrak provides rail service between 30th Street Station and Lancaster, Harrisburg, Pittsburgh, and Chicago to the west, Baltimore and Washington, D.C. to the southwest, and New York City, Boston, and Montreal to the northeast. SEPTA's Wilmington/Newark Line and Trenton Line run along Amtrak's Northeast Corridor. SEPTA's Paoli/Thorndale Line runs along the far eastern leg of Amtrak's Philadelphia to Harrisburg Main Line and Keystone Corridor.

All Regional Rail routes stop at 30th Street Station's upper platform. It is a short walk down a ramp to Amtrak's gates. Other shared Amtrak/Regional Rail stations include Wilmington and Newark on the Wilmington/Newark Line, Ardmore, Paoli, Exton, and Downingtown on the Paoli/Thorndale Line, and Trenton on the Trenton Line. Amtrak also offers limited service from North Philadelphia and Cornwells Heights, which are also on Trenton Line. Amtrak is faster than SEPTA, but significantly more expensive, particularly for services along the Northeast Corridor.

Greyhound and a variety of interregional bus operators, most of which are part of the Trailways system, stop at the Philadelphia Greyhound Terminal. In addition to being adjacent to Jefferson Station, the terminal is one block from the Market–Frankford Line's 11th Street station and various SEPTA bus routes. Major destinations served with one-seat rides to and from the terminal include Allentown, Atlantic City, Baltimore, Harrisburg, Newark, New York City, Pittsburgh, Reading, Scranton, Washington, D.C., and Wilmington. Six NJ Transit bus routes (313, 315, 316, 317, 318, and 551) originate and terminate from this terminal.

SEPTA serves Philadelphia International Airport with local bus service and with the Airport Line from Center City.

== Criticism and recognition ==
=== 20th century ===
SEPTA's 50-year history has often been tumultuous because the agency is governed at a county level rather than state level. Railpace Newsmagazine contributor Gerry Williams observed that SEPTA regularly staggers from crisis to crisis, with little support or oversight originating at the state level in Harrisburg. It has a long history of being at odds with the riding public and both county and state officials. SEPTA has had more labor strikes than any other transit agency in the U.S., occurring in 1977, 1981, 1983, 1986, 1995, 1998, 2005, 2009, 2014, and 2016.

Williams commented that there is a notable lack of "any group... influential enough to bring shame on SEPTA," adding that SEPTA's chronic ills "merely reflect the broader problems of local provincialism and petty political squabbles which are so rampant within the (Philadelphia metropolitan area) region." The five counties it serves regularly have various hidden agendas working in the background, often at cross purposes with one another than as a unified region, a problem that has resulted in many services being severed mid-route without regard to the affected counties. This factor is regularly influenced by the changing political winds at the state capital in Harrisburg.

=== 21st century ===
SEPTA made improvements in the 21st century that helped reverse the downward trend. $191 million of funds made available from the American Recovery and Reinvestment Act of 2009 were utilized to make over 30 major improvements to the system, including renovations of the Spring Garden and Girard Avenue subway stations and building the first Leadership in Energy and Environmental Design (LEED) station at Fox Chase terminal in 2010. SEPTA also inaugurated a consolidated, multi-modal control center that helps manage all aspects of the system.

SEPTA was voted the best large transit agency in North America by the American Public Transportation Association (APTA) in July 2012. The award was criticized by Next City columnist Diana Lind, stating that despite some outward appearances of improvement, SEPTA still largely operates under a cloud of non-transparency and continues to lack a system-wide expansion program for the future. This is most notable in the regional rail division, which suffered severe cutbacks in the 1980s and whose affected routes have been converted into rail trails, preventing a restoration of those services for the foreseeable future. When asked to produce data pertaining to SEPTA's repeated attempts to consolidate bus stops, Lind observed "the report on the project barely elaborates on the information. SEPTA's trials deserve public attention and input. The public deserves the data—show us the average times before and after the pilot. Give reader surveys. Tell us why you haven't tried another pilot on another bus line."

Between 2009 and 2013, SEPTA was criticised for its use of sex identification markers on the SEPTA-issued monthly transit passes, as some transgender and gender-queer people had experienced discrimination related to the markers. These markers, SEPTA said, were an anti-fraud measure designed to prevent people in the same household sharing a monthly pass. However, the lobby group SEPTA Riders Against Gender Exclusion (SEPTA R.A.G.E) said that the sex identification markers had resulted in harassment, violence, and discrimination for those who did not physically match the stated sex on the pass. The markers on the monthly passes were stopped in June 2013.

In October 2020, SEPTA trialled the use of lean benches instead of traditional seating at some of its stations. This was criticized by some as lean benches are widely considered to be hostile architecture, designed to stop homeless populations using the stations to sleep. SEPTA stated that the use of the lean benches was to encourage social distancing to prevent the spread the COVID-19. These trials concluded in September 2021 with the removal of the lean benches.

One of the biggest issues facing SEPTA is passengers smoking and vaping in stations and vehicles. SEPTA has been subject to criticism for not doing a sufficient job of upholding the law which prohibits smoking in public transportation facilities and vehicles.

== See also ==
- Doe v. Southeastern Pennsylvania Transportation Authority
- List of metro systems
- List of United States rapid transit systems by ridership
- Commuter rail in North America
- List of suburban and commuter rail systems
- List of United States commuter rail systems by ridership
- List of light rail transit systems
- List of United States light rail systems by ridership
- List of United States local bus agencies by ridership

== Sources ==
- Williams, Gerry (1998). Trains, Trolleys & Transit: A Guide to Philadelphia Area Rail Transit. Piscataway, New Jersey: Railpace Company. ISBN 978-0-9621541-7-1.
