= 1983 SEPTA Regional Rail strike =

1983 labor strike in Pennsylvania

- Date: March 15 – June 30, 1983 (3 months, 2 weeks and 1 day)
- Location: Greater Philadelphia, Pennsylvania, United States
- Caused by: Disagreements over the terms of labor contracts between SEPTA and several labor unions previously under contract with Conrail
- Methods: Picketing; Strike action; Walkout
- Result: SEPTA and the unions agree to new labor contracts that largely retained seniority and fringe benefits, but included pay decreases and reduction in union positions

Parties
SEPTA	12 labor unions

On March 15, 1983, employees of SEPTA Regional Rail, represented by 12 different labor unions, went on strike following the breakdown in negotiations over the terms of new labor contracts. The strike ended on June 30, after all of the unions agreed to new contracts.

The origin of the labor dispute comes from a 1981 act implemented by the federal government of the United States that ordered the Southeastern Pennsylvania Transportation Authority (SEPTA) to take over operations for several commuter rail lines in Greater Philadelphia that had previously been operated by Conrail. Starting in August 1982, SEPTA entered into negotiations with the 15 local unions representing workers on these lines over the terms of new labor contracts, but was unable to reach agreements with all but three of the unions by March 1983. On March 15, the remaining 12 unions declared a strike action, halting train operations on all lines in the system. Over the next several months, SEPTA managed to negotiate individual contracts with the unions, with the final union, representing signalmen, reaching an agreement on June 30, bringing the strike to a close after over 100 days.

The strike is the longest in SEPTA's history and coincided with similar strikes in New Jersey and New York that also stemmed from the transfer of operations from Conrail to local transit agencies. The new labor contracts largely retained seniority and fringe benefits for the union members, but instituted pay decreases and led to the reduction of 600 union jobs from the rail lines. In the long term, the strike severely hurt ridership levels for the system, which would not see pre-strike levels until 2008. Additionally, according to historian Jake Berman, the strike derailed the planned implementation of several reforms designed to increase efficiency on the Regional Rail system that would have included automated fare collection and level boarding, among other things.

== Background ==
=== Conrail ===
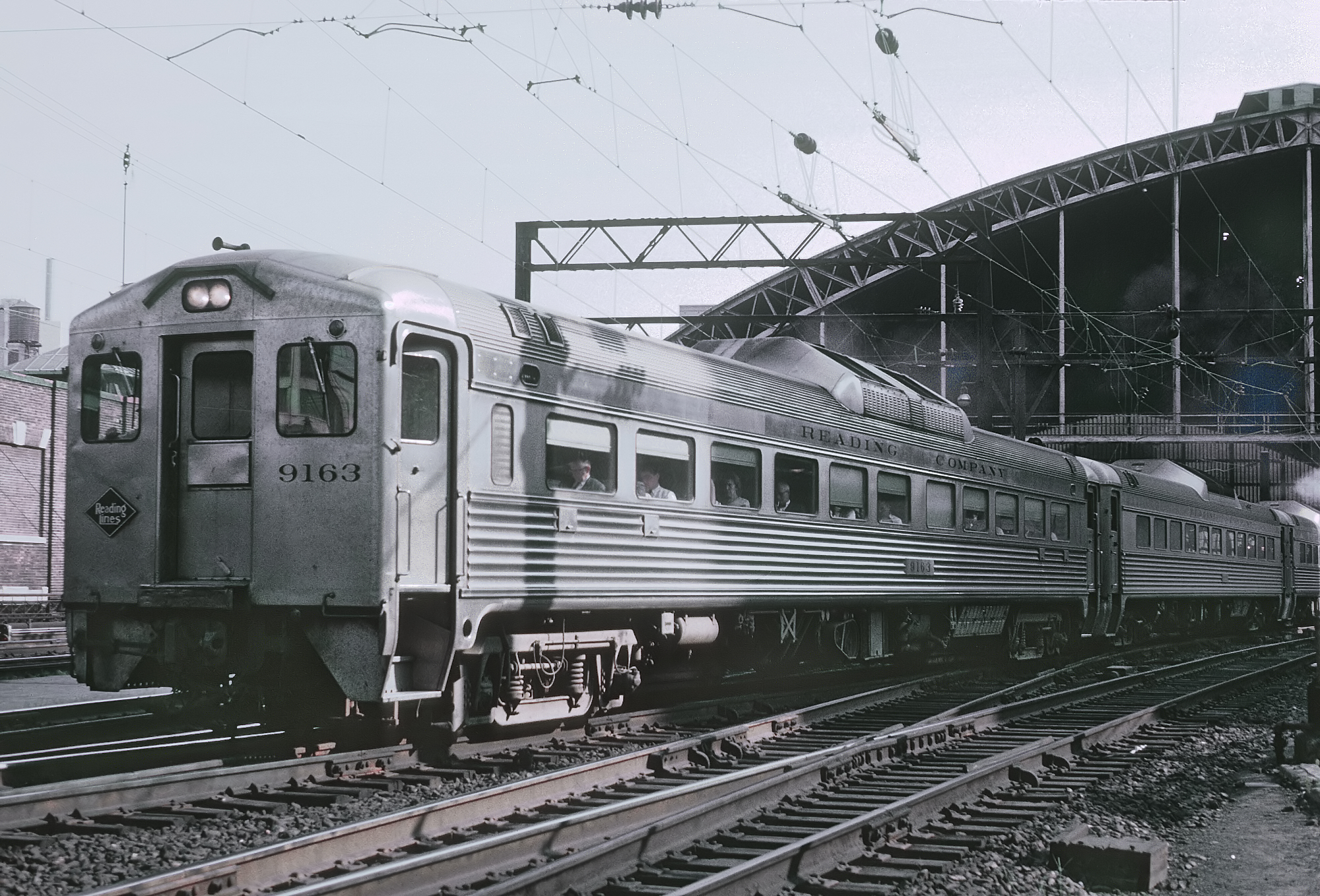
A commuter rail train at Reading Terminal in Philadelphia, 1964

Conrail was a corporation created by the US government in 1976 to take over operations for six railroad companies based in the Northeastern United States that had recently gone bankrupt. This corporation, overseen by the United States Railway Association, operated commuter rail lines for multiple public transit authorities in the region, including NJ Transit in New Jersey, the Metropolitan Transportation Authority in New York, and the Southeastern Pennsylvania Transportation Authority (SEPTA) in Pennsylvania.

With the passage of the Northeast Railway Service Act of 1981, the United States Congress ordered these transit agencies to take over commuter rail line operations from Conrail and to negotiate with the labor unions that had existing contracts with Conrail. The legislation also authorized the creation of Presidential Emergency Boards to address any potential issues that might have arisen as a result of the takeovers. In the case of SEPTA, the authority had to take over 12 rail lines in five counties within the Greater Philadelphia area, a system that had a daily ridership of about 50,000 people. Additionally, SEPTA would have to negotiate new labor agreements with 15 unions, representing roughly 1,500 Conrail employees. These local unions included chapters of the following national labor unions:

- United Transportation Union
- International Brotherhood of Electrical Workers
- Brotherhood of Railway and Airline Clerks
- International Brotherhood of Railway Signalmen
- Brotherhood of Railway Carmen
- Brotherhood of Locomotive Engineers
- Brotherhood of Maintenance of Way Employes
- Railroad Yardmasters of America
- Transport Workers Union of America
- American Train Dispatchers Association

The transit agencies were given deadlines of January 1, 1983, to take over operations.

=== Negotiations between SEPTA and the unions ===
Contract negotiations between SEPTA and the unions began in August 1982. By November, negotiations between the transit agencies and unions were still ongoing, with the Philadelphia emergency board reporting that SEPTA and the unions were not engaging in productive negotiation sessions. The main points of contention between the two sides concerned pay raises, wage scales, and work rules concerning manning levels. With regards to the latter, SEPTA was seeking to reduce staffing, proposing that some trains be run with two-member crews instead of the existing three-member crews. In total, SEPTA's proposals would have eliminated 600 existing union jobs, replacing some of them with contractors.

Regarding pay, the unions were seeking for SEPTA to implement a deferred raise that they had previously negotiated with Conrail and to maintain the existing wage scales. At Conrail, the average annual pay was $42,000 (equivalent to $140,000 in 2025) for engineers, $38,000 ($127,000 in 2025) for conductors, and $35,000 ($117,000 in 2025) for brakemen and trainmen. SEPTA countered with limits of $35,000 for engineers and $31,000 ($103,000 in 2025) for the other professions. SEPTA also offered a supplemental pay amount to help Conrail employees with the transition to SEPTA, but stated that future pay raises for SEPTA employees would eventually bring former Conrail employees onto the same pay levels. At the time of the takeover, the average annual cost of employment for a Conrail employee, including wages and fringe benefits, was in excess of $40,000 ($133,000 in 2025), while the same cost for a SEPTA employee was roughly $26,400 ($88,100 in 2025). Highlighting the need for these changes, SEPTA pointed out that its commuter rail division was running on a $9.6 million ($32 million in 2025) deficit for the most recent fiscal year and that subsidies from the federal government were declining. SEPTA also pointed out that it was one of only a few major public transit agencies that lacked the ability to directly tax its constituents and that fare increases between 1979 and 1981 had led to a 20 percent decline in ridership.

Around the end of November, both sides submitted their "final best offers" to the emergency board, which had until December 8 to issue a nonbinding recommendation to the two parties. In these offers, both sides offered some concessions, with the unions agreeing to cease demands for SEPTA to implement the deferred raise. Speaking about the takeover, Philadelphia Mayor William J. Green III said that a shutdown on January 1 was a distinct possibility if an agreement was not reached by then but said in an interview with a reporter for The New York Times, "Shutdowns don't last forever".

=== SEPTA announces temporary shutdown ===
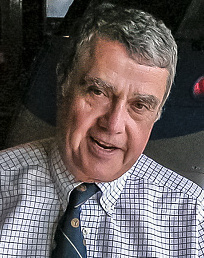
David L. Gunn (pictured 2002) was the general manager of SEPTA during their negotiations with former Conrail unions.

On December 25, 1982, David L. Gunn, the general manager of SEPTA, announced that the authority planned to temporarily halt all operations on all commuter rail lines after the unions' contracts expired on December 31. Gunn stated that the shutdown, which was expected to last for several weeks, was due to the inability of SEPTA and the unions to come to an agreement on new contracts, saying that the authority could not guarantee that key workers would show up to work without a contract in place and that SEPTA could therefore not guarantee safe train operations. Additionally, the system would be at risk of a strike action at any time without new contracts.

Gunn's statements were refuted by union representatives who stated that the previous week, they had agreed to operate temporarily without permanent contracts under any terms specified by SEPTA, with one attorney representing the unions saying, "No way will a Jan. 1 disruption of rail service be the result of a strike". Vice President Al Archual of the Brotherhood of Railway and Airline Clerks, whose union represented about 800 employees affected by the takeover, called SEPTA's decision a "farce". Shortly after the announcement, commuters of the regional rail system filed a class action lawsuit against SEPTA, with Judge Abraham Gafni of the Pennsylvania courts of common pleas ordering the authority to continue train operations. By the end of the year, SEPTA had signed new contracts with two unions but were still in negotiations with 13 others.

=== Continued negotiations following takeover ===
Following the last Conrail train departure on December 31, SEPTA temporarily shut down the system for 18 hours as the authority took over operations. Initially, the authority planned to only run 108 of the system's regularly scheduled 550 trains until it could bring service to full operations. On January 1, 1983, the system had what The New York Times described as an "interruption of service", with trains running on limited schedules. Employees who were members of unions that had not yet agreed to new contracts with SEPTA continued to work while contract negotiations continued. By February 12, negotiations were still ongoing with 12 labor unions, representing about 1,000 employees, that had set a deadline of February 15 to either agree to a new contract or go on strike. David Cohen of the Philadelphia City Council stated that negotiations were still "touch and go", adding, "The unions appreciate our concern that, if the commuter rail system is shut down, we are not sure that it can be reopened in the form we presently have". Cohen also stated that he and City Council President Joseph E. Coleman were seeking for Judge Bernard Goodheart to appoint an official who could "assure that round-the-clock negotiations" continued. On February 13, Archual, who was the chairman of the group representing the 12 unions, announced that the group had voted to postpone the strike deadline in part because of Coleman and Cohen's request for court supervision of negotiations.

During negotiations, the largest of the 12 unions, the United Transportation Union (UTU), which represented several hundred conductors and trainmen, set a strike deadline of March 15, which was agreed to by the other unions. This deadline coincided with another strike deadline set by the Transport Workers Union of America (TWU), the union representing SEPTA workers on the authority's bus, streetcar, and subway services. A combined strike affecting both of these SEPTA divisions would affect roughly 500,000 daily riders, including 50,000 on the commuter rail division and 450,000 on the other services. By March 15, while SEPTA had managed to negotiate a new agreement with TWU, an agreement with the 12 railroad unions was not reached, with a strike commencing that day.

== Course of the strike ==
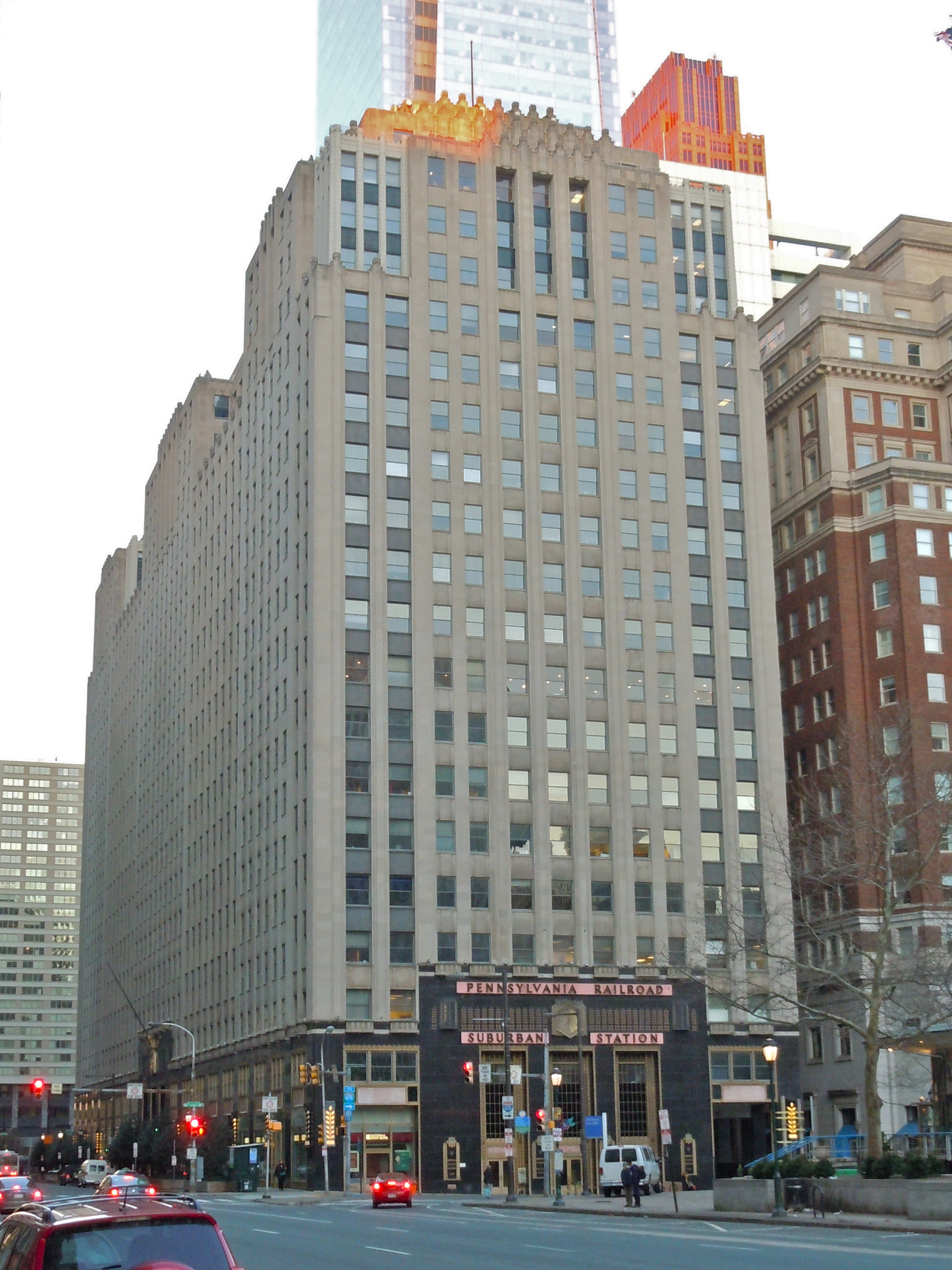
Strikers picketed outside of several SEPTA stations, including Suburban Station (pictured 2010) in Center City.

Picket lines were set up in the early morning of March 15, prior to the first scheduled departure at 5:45 a.m. EST, and effectively shut down all lines. While only 12 of the 15 unions were officially on strike, the other three that had already accepted new contracts with SEPTA agreed to remain off the job while the strike proceeded. Main targets of picketing included SEPTA's headquarters, Reading Terminal, Suburban Station, and Wayne Junction station. Despite the disruptions, traffic on arterial highways in the area was not as bad as city officials had expected, possibly due in part to staggered work hours and successful carpool initiatives. Additionally, over the course of the strike, SEPTA added 150 vehicles to its transit division, while some commuters who lived further away from Center City began to use Amtrak services that still ran to the city's 30th Street Station. On the morning of March 21, about a week after the start of the strike, negotiations resumed between the unions and SEPTA. On March 23, the 12 unions voted unanimously to reject what The New York Times called "a 30-day cooling-off period" that had been proposed by a judge, opting instead to continue with strike actions.

On April 23, the local union of the Brotherhood of Railway Carmen, one of the three non-striking unions, voted to cross the picket lines next week. According to the local's chairman, whose 56 members voted 19 to 15, with three abstentions, to return to work, the union members had already forfeited $2,600 ($8,400 in 2025) in pay at that point by deciding to honor the strike, and they were expected to lose $3,000 ($9,700 in 2025) by next week. By May 9, SEPTA had reached agreements with four of the 15 unions, and that day, after several days of long negotiating sessions, the authority announced that they had reached a tentative agreement with the UTU local, the largest local union on strike. That same day, SEPTA representatives stated that they planned to hold further negotiating sessions with the unions representing engineers and electrical workers later that week and that, if agreements were reached with them, it would mean that 90 percent of the total workforce for the regional railways would no longer be on strike.

By June, SEPTA had reached agreements with all of the local unions except for the International Brotherhood of Railway Signalmen, which represented 44 signalmen. SEPTA was hoping to have contractors perform some of the tasks usually done by the signalmen, while the union was seeking to protect the positions of all 44 of its members. On June 30, the union reached a compromise agreement with SEPTA wherein the authority could contract out some work regarding the installation of railroad signaling devices, with the caveat that a unionized signalmen would have to oversee the "final power connection", per The New York Times. The agreement brought an end to the strike on June 30, with commuter rail services recommencing on July 3.

== Aftermath ==
=== Immediate aftermath ===
The strike, which was the longest in SEPTA's history, occurred at the same time as other strikes in New Jersey and New York that resulted from the takeover of Conrail operations in those states by local transit agencies. Following the restart of commuter rail services, a number of issues cropped up during the first day of resumed services, including maintenance problems and scheduling delays on several trains. In Jenkintown, one train ripped down a section of overhead line, resulting in temporary cancellations for the lines servicing that area. According to a mid-April 1983 article in The Philadelphia Inquirer, the strike had saved SEPTA $2 million ($6 million in 2025) at that point as a result of increased subway and bus ridership and not having to run unprofitable commuter rail lines, prompting Archual to question whether or not the strike was a ploy on SEPTA's behalf to do away with the Regional Rail system altogether and replace it with more cost-efficient alternatives. However, SEPTA denied these accusations.

With the new contracts, SEPTA largely agreed to the unions' existing seniority clauses and, in some cases, granted improved fringe benefits to the unions than they had had under Conrail. However, the settlements also resulted in the eventual elimination of 600 union jobs and pay reductions for some of the highest-paid union members on the rail lines, as well as lower pay for new union members.

=== Long-term impact ===
According to a 1983 article in the magazine Trains, the long duration of the strike could be attributed to several factors, including ample alternative public transit options, the general ease of accessing Center City without using the commuter rail system, and the willingness of SEPTA officials to remain adamant against union demands. An article in the Encyclopedia of Greater Philadelphia cites "poor planning by SEPTA" as the main cause for the issues and difficulties that plagued the system takeover.

The strike took place during the construction of the Center City Commuter Connection, a rail tunnel designed to improve the commuter rail system in Center City, and, more generally, during a time when SEPTA was working with public transit planner Vukan R. Vuchic of the University of Pennsylvania on a number of reforms designed to improve the Regional Rail system. According to historian Jake Berman, the strike derailed the implementation of these proposed reforms, which would have included automated fare collection, level boarding, and simplified transfers, among other things. The strike caused a decline in SEPTA Regional Rail ridership from a 1980 total of 32.2 million to just 12.9 million in 1983, and it would take until 2008 for the system to return to its 1980 level of ridership. During this time, the Encyclopedia notes that, with the exception of the completion of the Center City Commuter Connection in 1984 and the creation of the Airport Line to serve the Philadelphia International Airport, "SEPTA’s operation of commuter rail service became a story of service cutbacks, line abandonments, and fare increases". The 1983 strike would be the last strike to affect SEPTA Regional Rail until a 2014 strike action.

== Sources ==
- Berman, Jake (2023). The Lost Subways of North America: A Cartographic Guide to the Past, Present, and What Might Have Been. Illustrated by Jake Berman. Chicago: University of Chicago Press. ISBN 978-0-226-82980-7. LCCN 2023002893.
- Thoms, William E. (October 1983). Morgan, David P. (ed.). "Is the clock running down for U.S. rail commuters?". Trains. 43 (12). Milwaukee: Kalmbach Publishing: 30–35. ISSN 0041-0934. OCLC 51782761.
