= United States v. Westinghouse Electric Co. =

- Court: United States Court of Appeals for the Ninth Circuit
- Full case name: United States of America, Plaintiff-Appellant, v. Westinghouse Electric Corporation, Mitsubishi Electric Corporation, and Mitsubishi Heavy Industries, Ltd., Defendants-Appellees. Mitsubishi Electric Corporation, and Mitsubishi Heavy Industries, Ltd., Defendants-Cross-Appellants, v. United States of America, Plaintiff-Cross-Appellee
- Argued: December 8, 1980
- Decided: June 18, 1981
- Citation: 648 F.2d 642

Case history
- Prior history: 471 F. Supp. 532 (N.D. Cal. 1978)

Court membership
- Judges sitting: Ben C. Duniway, Irving Loeb Goldberg, William Canby

Case opinions
- Majority: Duniway, joined by a unanimous panel

United States v. Westinghouse Electric Corp., 648 F.2d 642 (9th Cir. 1981), is a patent-antitrust case in which the United States unsuccessfully tried to persuade the court that a patent and technology licensing agreement between major competitors in the highly concentrated heavy electrical equipment market—Westinghouse, Mitsubishi Electric (Melco) and Mitsubishi Heavy Industries (MHI)—which had the effect of territorially dividing world markets, violated § 1 of the Sherman Act. The Government had two principal theories of the case: (1) the arrangement is in unreasonable restraint of trade because its effect is to lessen competition substantially by precluding the Japanese defendant companies from bidding against Westinghouse on equipment procurements in the United States, when they are ready, willing, and able to do so; and (2) the arrangement is an agreement—explicit or tacit—to divide markets, which is illegal per se under § 1. Neither theory prevailed.

== Background ==
General Electric (not a party to this action) and Westinghouse are the two leading U.S. manufacturers and sellers of heavy electrical equipment such as power transformers, power circuit breakers, hydroelectric generators, and gas and steam turbines. Melco and MHI are the leading Japanese manufacturers and sellers of such equipment. The relationship between Westinghouse and the two Mitsubishi defendants and their predecessors extends back to the early part of the 20th century. Prior to World War II they were parties to contracts (for example, a 1923 contract, which, the district court said, "apparently divided world markets between Westinghouse and the predecessors of the Mitsubishi defendants') under which Westinghouse supplied them technical and manufacturing information and received royalties on the sale of their products. These agreements permitted the predecessors of the Mitsubishi defendants to sell the products only in Japan and China. The arrangement was interrupted by World War II.

After the War, Westinghouse entered into the first of several technical assistance agreements with Melco in 1951 and with a predecessor of MHI in 1952. These agreements have continued since that time; they licensed Melco and MHI under Westinghouse's heavy electrical equipment patents to make and sell throughout the world except Canada and the United States, and provided for Westinghouse to furnish Melco and MHI with technical information to make the products. The agreements reciprocally authorized Westinghouse to make and sell, except in Japan, products incorporating patented technology and know-how that Melco and MHI transferred to Westinghouse. The Government sued Westinghouse, Melco, and MHI in the Northern District of California (San Francisco) for combining and conspiring to restrain trade and commerce in heavy electrical equipment.

The Government relied on evidence which "conclusively establish[ed] that Melco and MHI each refrained from selling products falling within the Licensing and Technology Agreements in the United States and Canada without first obtaining Westinghouse approval." The evidence was mainly sets of correspondence and other documents relating to a number of bidding "incidents," in each of which a Japanese defendants wrote to Westinghouse requesting to bid on a particular hydroelectric project or other project using heavy electrical equipment, and then Westinghouse granted the request if it was not interested in itself bidding or denied the request otherwise.

For example, the government cited the period from January 1966 to March 1967 in which Mitsubishi Electric received a number of specific bid inquiries for the sale of electrical equipment to the United States, including projects for the Sacramento Municipal Utility District, the California Department of Water Resources, the Turlock & Modesto Irrigation District (California), and the Bureau of Reclamation, United States Department of the Interior. In each instance Westinghouse, after inquiry from Mitsubishi Electric, refused to allow Mitsubishi Electric to bid on the projects, and it did not do so.

The district court concluded, however, that this merely showed the Japanese defendants' desire to avoid committing patent infringement. The court also said that the parties' agreements "provide a strong inference that patents extend to all licensed products involved in this suit." Thus, the court said, "the Government's own evidence thus raises competing inferences of a legitimate 'patent motivation,' on the one hand, and an illegal agreement, on the other, to explain defendants' conduct," and the Government failed to persuade the court that the motivation was a desire to divide territories rather than to respect patent rights.

The Government also offered a number of documents in which permission to bid in the United States or Canada was denied without mention of patents. The court refused to infer that this indicated an illegal agreement to divide markets. It said:

Contrary to the Government's assertions, the precise language used by the defendants in their day-to-day dealings is not indicative of an illegal arrangement simply because the word "patent" was not used. It is hardly strange or incriminating for the parties in dealings among themselves or with strangers to say that the agreement "prohibits sale in the United States," even though a more precise statement would be, for example, that "since our agreement does not give patent licenses for sales in the United States any such sales are, in effect, prohibited because they could result in patent infringement litigation." This is particularly true of those employees and independent marketing agents whose obvious interest is in whether, as opposed to why, a product can or cannot be sold.

The district court (Judge Stanley Weigel) held that the legal significance of the repeated case–by–case requests for approval to bid "depends on the state of mind of Melco and MHI in seeking Westinghouse approval." The court refused to infer the existence of an illegal agreement not to compete in the United States. It agreed with the defendants that Melco and MHI did not refrain from competing in the United States on the basis of an illegal agreement with Westinghouse but rather out of fear of infringing Westinghouse patents. The court dismissed the contention that the grant of a patent license outside the United States coupled with case–by–case and customer–by–customer approvals or denials of bid permission violated § 1 of the Sherman Act. The court approved instead the argument that "a patentee's right to shut off all competition must necessarily include the lesser right to restrict the exercise of the granted privilege so long as the patentee does not attach a condition that enlarges his monopoly beyond that given by the patent statute and the patent itself." The court dismissed the case.

== Ruling of Ninth Circuit ==
The Government appealed the dismissal judgment to the Ninth Circuit, which affirmed the judgment of no antitrust violation.

The court described the Government's principal theory in these terms"

The United States market for the electrical products covered by the agreements is heavily concentrated. Although they are two of the largest manufacturers of electrical products outside the United States, MHI and MELCO do not compete in this market. Their entrance into the United States market would substantially increase the amount of competition in that market. By 1965 MELCO and MHI wished to sell in the United States and had the technical ability to design around Westinghouse's many patents. Their failure to do so, the government contends, is a direct result of the Technical Assistance Agreements. Because MELCO and MHI are licensed by the Agreements under Westinghouse's foreign patents, and because they have had such licenses for a long period of time, they have become so committed to Westinghouse technology as to be economically incapable of developing new products that might compete in the United States without infringing upon Westinghouse's United States patents. Without licenses under Westinghouse's United States patents, MELCO and MHI are effectively barred from the United States market by dint of the patent laws and the heavy investment in Westinghouse technology that the Technical Assistance Agreements induced them to make.

The Ninth Circuit considered this theory "novel and laced with paradox":

By the act of helping MELCO and MHI to prosper and to grow into large corporations in its own image, Westinghouse is said to have insulated its home market from their competition in violation of the antitrust laws. The government urges that although the Agreements may not have resulted in an unreasonable restraint of trade when first signed in 1951 and 1952, at some point in 1965, when MELCO and MHI became capable of competing in the United States and capable of designing around Westinghouse's patents but for their investment in Westinghouse technology, the Agreements came to violate the antitrust laws. Accordingly, the government asked the district court to order an end to the Agreements and to require Westinghouse to license MELCO and MHI under its United States patents.

The Government's main appeal argument was "that Mitsubishi has become so wedded to Westinghouse technology, because of the Agreements, as to be unable to compete in the United States market," The court responded:

In advancing its theory, however, the government argues that an antitrust violation may be found where a patent holder does precisely that which the patent laws authorize. Westinghouse has done no more than to license some of its patents and refuse to license others. . . , The right to license that patent, exclusively or otherwise, or to refuse to license at all, is "the untrammeled right" of the patentee. In short, in granting MELCO and MHI some licenses but not others, Westinghouse did no more than employ means "normally and reasonably adapted to secure pecuniary reward for the [patent] monopoly."

By the same token, the Government's theory that:

[B]ecause Westinghouse has, in effect, burdened Mitsubishi with its foreign patent licenses, thus tying it to Westinghouse technology, Westinghouse should now be required to license its United States patents to Mitsubishi, so that Mitsubishi can compete in the United States . . . flies in the face of the rule that a holder of United States patents has a right to refuse to license them.

"The antitrust laws do not grant the government a roving commission to reform the economy at will," the court added. Just because a patentee has granted a potential competitor some licenses does not mean that the patentee must grant additional licenses. Furthermore, the theory that a license lawful in its exception could become unlawful at a later time when the licensee has "flourished under the agreement" is unacceptable because it would "seriously undermine" the patent system. Thus, "even if it is true that MHI and MELCO would have entered the United States electrical equipment market by designing new products but for their existing success with Westinghouse technology, there is no basis for the theory in law."

The Ninth Circuit also rejected the theory that the case-by-case grants and denials of permissions to bid showed an agreement to divide territories. The Government argued that the district court's determination that Melco and MHI did not refrain from bidding without permission on the basis of an illegal agreement with Westinghouse but rather out of fear of infringing Westinghouse patents was immaterial:

The Government now argues that the court erred in focusing on motivation: If the effect of the Agreements and of the requests for and denials or grants of approval was to unreasonably limit competition in the United States, then the Agreements violate the antitrust laws regardless of whether the motivation of the parties is to divide the market or to avoid patent infringement.

The court said that the Government must prove bad intent in order to prevail, and it did not do so. "The desire of Mitsubishi to avoid infringing upon Westinghouse's many patents—perhaps even as to products only arguably covered by Westinghouse's patents—undoubtedly has an effect on competition, but this is an effect which results from the monopoly granted by the patent laws and does not establish an antitrust violation by the companies in this case."

The Government did not seek to petition the Supreme Court for certiorari in this case, its decision reflecting a change of prosecutorial policy with a change of Administration.

== Commentary ==
● Several months after the Westinghouse–Mitsubishi case was filed the Wall Street Journal quoted the President of Magnavox Corp. as saying: "If the Justice Department's effort is successful, we are all in jeopardy. The consequences would be an undisciplined international scramble for markets." The Journal also quoted the U.S. Department of Commerce as disapproving of the case because its success would "cut domestic profits and jobs and adversely affect our balance of payments."

● Thomas Vakerics, in Antitrust Basics, comments that the effect of Westinghouse's arrangement was equivalent to a horizontal allocation of territories:

By refusing to license Mitsubishi under its United States patents, Westinghouse was able to exclude Mitsubishi from selling the patented products in the United States. Thus there apparently were no territorial restrictions in the license agreements and no express agreement between the parties that transmit would not sell the patented products in the United States. By licensing transmit only under its foreign patents, however, Westinghouse was able to keep Mitsubishi out of the United States market and the effect of the arrangement was precisely the same as if territorial allocations had been expressly contained in the license.

● Richard H. Stern, at that time chief of the Justice Department patent–antitrust unit, in a 1970 article in IDEA, described the legal theory of the Westinghouse–Mitsubishi case, which had then recently been filed, without explicitly mentioning it by name. He began by describing the various ways that one could effectuate a division of domestic and foreign exploitation rights for patented technology:

1. a license coupled with an express agreement against importation into the United States (a so-called negative covenant);
2. a license on condition that the licensee not export to the United States; and
3. most often, a license of foreign patents without a corresponding license of domestic counterpart patents.

He argued that the distinction among the three formats is without "special significance" because "niceties in wording will not save what is an otherwise unlawful scheme," at least in domestic market allocation schemes. He then argues that the same principle applies in international licensing. He maintains that the "definitional problem of characterizing a territory provision in a license as a 'restriction' or not" should be subordinated to the more important "problem of determining whether the alleged restriction is in fact an undue one."

He then turns to the per se rule against allocation of territories of the Supreme Court's cartel cases, but suggests caution in applying it to international patent licensing. He stated:

Carried to its ultimate logical conclusion, this principle against allocation of markets might seem to outlaw any licensing agreement by which the owner of any domestic and foreign patent, whether of major or minor technological significance, granted a license under only one of the two patents. Nevertheless, to take the principle so broadly, as a matter of principle and without a more detailed economic analysis, would seem . . . probably to carry the rule farther than we should go. The problem should not be viewed as one of mere characterization (viz., should this provision be deemed a division-of markets agreement?) but rather as one of whether the economic effect is anticompetitive in the manner a division of markets injures competition.

He then addresses the distinction that, unlike domestic market allocations and international nonpatent allocations, international patent licensing allocations rely on sovereign grants compartmentalized along national boundary lines, thus implicating "discrete legal rights." He explained that this is a matter to be considered—"a proper accommodation of patent and antitrust policies should take this distinction into account"—but it is not necessarily determinative: "The question then becomes one of the degree to which this distinction should be considered to make a legal difference, for again the effect, and not the label, should be determinative of the outcome.

Stern then describes a continuum of fact patterns. At one end is a division of rights under one U.S. patent and a foreign counterpart of it, perhaps commercially of little importance. This arrangement is not of antitrust concern. The pattern at the other end of the continuum involves a contract between two major firms in a concentrated industry; the firms are potential competitors in each other's markets; the product and dollar volume is large; many different products and product lines are involved; the arrangement persists for a long time; the factors, taken together, suggest that incentives exist for the foreign partner to enter the U.S. market with technology derived otherwise and without a restriction against export to this country.

The easy antitrust cases are at the two ends of the continuum, he says, and the more difficult cases are in the middle. Stern suggests that this calls for the type of analysis the Supreme Court required in United States v. Columbia Steel Co., two decades earlier, "which is one of more or less, rather than one of absolutes." He concedes that "such an analysis is not wholly satisfactory for predicting the outcome of litigation," but it indicates that to avoid problems one should avoid unnecessarily titling the balance of factors to the unfavorable end of the continuum in drafting licenses. One should not put restrictions unneeded for business reasons into licenses just "as a matter of principle or habit." He maintains that it is not necessary to try to find out how close to the edge of a precipice it is possible to walk without falling over, and asserts that many businessmen "are able to conduct their affairs satisfactorily without trying to see how close to the Plimsoll Line it is possible to load the ship"—and at the same time do so "without any undue damage to legitimate business expectations."

● Howard Forman, in a 1971 article in IDEA, took issue with the positions being advanced at the Justice Department, and stated a view closer to that which the court of appeals took a decade later in the appeal of the Westinghouse–Mitsubishi judgment. Forman insisted that it is "not plausible to apply antitrust standards established for domestic purposes to situations involving patents granted and maintained under the laws of foreign countries where the standards may be totally different." He cautioned flexibility in applying the U.S. antitrust laws "to the end that the efficiency of mass production is not destroyed, orderly marketing conditions are insured, and economic dislocations of great industries are avoided." He warned that otherwise over-enforcement of antitrust might lead to "the possibility of killing the economic goose that lays the golden eggs of productivity and commerce."

Forman begins by challenging the equation of a failure to grant a foreign licensee a license to the U.S. counterpart patent, on the one hand, with a territorial limitation or territorial restriction, on the other hand. Forman insists that a :failure" is not an affirmative act, the implication being that the antitrust laws proscribe only affirmative or positive actions, not inactions or failures to act.

Forman then objects to what he perceives as a governmental approach to the antitrust legality of international licensing base exclusively on the economic effect in the United States. He posits a hypothetical case in which A has patents in the United States, France, and Italy, and wants to license B in France and Italy, but not in the United States. Hypothetically, the French and Italian governments are anxious to have the patents worked in their countries, but the U.S. Department of Justice may object. Forman argues:

It would seem that the French and Italian governments have a prevailing legal right; and company A has a legal privilege or duty to exercise its foreign patents, as permitted or required under the laws of the countries which granted them, without concern over the possible economic effects which such exercise, sans the right in the foreign licensees to practice the invention in the U.S., may have in the U.S.

Forman chides Stern and the Justice Department for "somewhat shallowly" subordinating the rights of foreign sovereigns to antitrust policies of the United States directed to protecting the U.S. economy and disregarding the wishes of U.S. patent owners in how most profitably to exploit their technology creations. What if the foreign country has a "compulsory working requirement," Forman asks, and the penalty for not working a patent is its forfeiture? If the U.S. company is in no position to work the patent in a foreign country, the logical thing to do is license to a foreign company. If that results in the U.S. antitrust authorities forcing him to grant the foreign company a license also on the U.S. patent, "this would be tantamount to establishing a system of compulsory patent licensing in the United States," which only Congress has the authority to do. Forman then accuses the Department of Justice of "encroaching on the prerogatives of the Congress" if it persists in this "misapplication of our antitrust laws."

● Douglas Rosenthal, a former Justice Department official, commented on the Ninth Circuit's opinion affirming the dismissal of the government's case. He stated that the court's opinion represented only "one possible reading of the trial record, which can be read to reach a different result." In his view:

A review of the record reveals that serious anticompetitive problems existed with the Westinghouse-Mitsubishi licenses. At the time of the trial, the agreements between the two multi-billion-dollar international enterprises in the highly concentrated international electrical equipment industry were over fifty years old. They covered know-how as well as patent transfers. The licenses covered virtually all of their electrical product lines (hundreds of products), and prevented each company from competing in the other's home market. The license also did not detail the specific patents held by each company that would have ostensibly blocked entry into the market of the other country. The combination of such a broad cross-license, in which the property is not clearly described, with territorial restrictions, for such an extended period, would suggest that much of the licenses' technology, whether patent or know-how, is of little value and that the purpose and effect of the licenses is to restrict potential competition rather than to share technology.

He therefore asked the question whether one should conclude that the arrangement, while lawful in its postwar inception when Mitsubishi was not a substantial competitive factor in the industry, arguably lost its legality once the licensee, Mitsubishi, became fully competitive with the licensor, Westinghouse, sometime in the 1960s.

● In an earlier article, Rosenthal and two other former State Department and Justice Department officials, commented on the trial court's decision in the case. They perceive "an impasse as to what types of technology-sharing arrangements between large firms in concentrated markets should be and are illegal," marked by several contradictory legal theories. "The first, and most dubious," they say, is that of Judge Weigel in the Westinghouse-Mitsubishi case. His theory, they explain is:

His decision was based on two considerations: (1) it is necessary to prove anticompetitive intent to render such an agreement illegal, regardless of the anticompetitive effect, and (2) no such intent is shown here because the most plausible explanation for the failure of Mitsubishi to sell in the United States in competition with Westinghouse is fear of infringing on Westinghouse patents.

This theory, they assert, "flatly contradicts the Supreme Court decision in National Society of Professional Engineers v. United States, which held that the legality of agreements must be tested against their effect on competition." In addition, they argue, it was error to require the government to bear the burden to "introduce...specific evidence showing that there were Westinghouse patents actually blocking Mitsubishi sales," because under prior precedent it is the burden of the patentee to show patent coverage.

They describe an alternative theory, proposed on appeal:

A major manufacturer in a highly concentrated market may not repeatedly renew broad, multiproduct, multipatent license agreements that have the effect of disabling major potential competitors from providing badly needed additional competition in the United States.

They suggest that although long–term international patent licensing does promote some efficient dissemination of technology, "the disincentives to independent research in concentrated industries, stemming from dependence, on a licensee effectively eliminated from the competitive market for perhaps two or three decades" may well outweigh the public benefits of such collaboration. "The essential problem," they say, is determining whether or how long it would take before "a licensee could become a competitor of the licensor without the benefit of the license." But there is no objective or precise way to establish this. Therefore, they propose that:

[T]he most effective approach for exercising greater control over excessive concentration by technology licensing would be to shift the burden of proof to the licensing parties where the territorial restraint exceeds a period of, say, fifteen years, and the parties are large, well-financed, technologically sophisticated, and operating in noncompetitive industries with significant barriers to entry.
