= Gulph Creek =

River in Pennsylvania, United States

Coordinates: 40°04′26″N 75°18′56″W

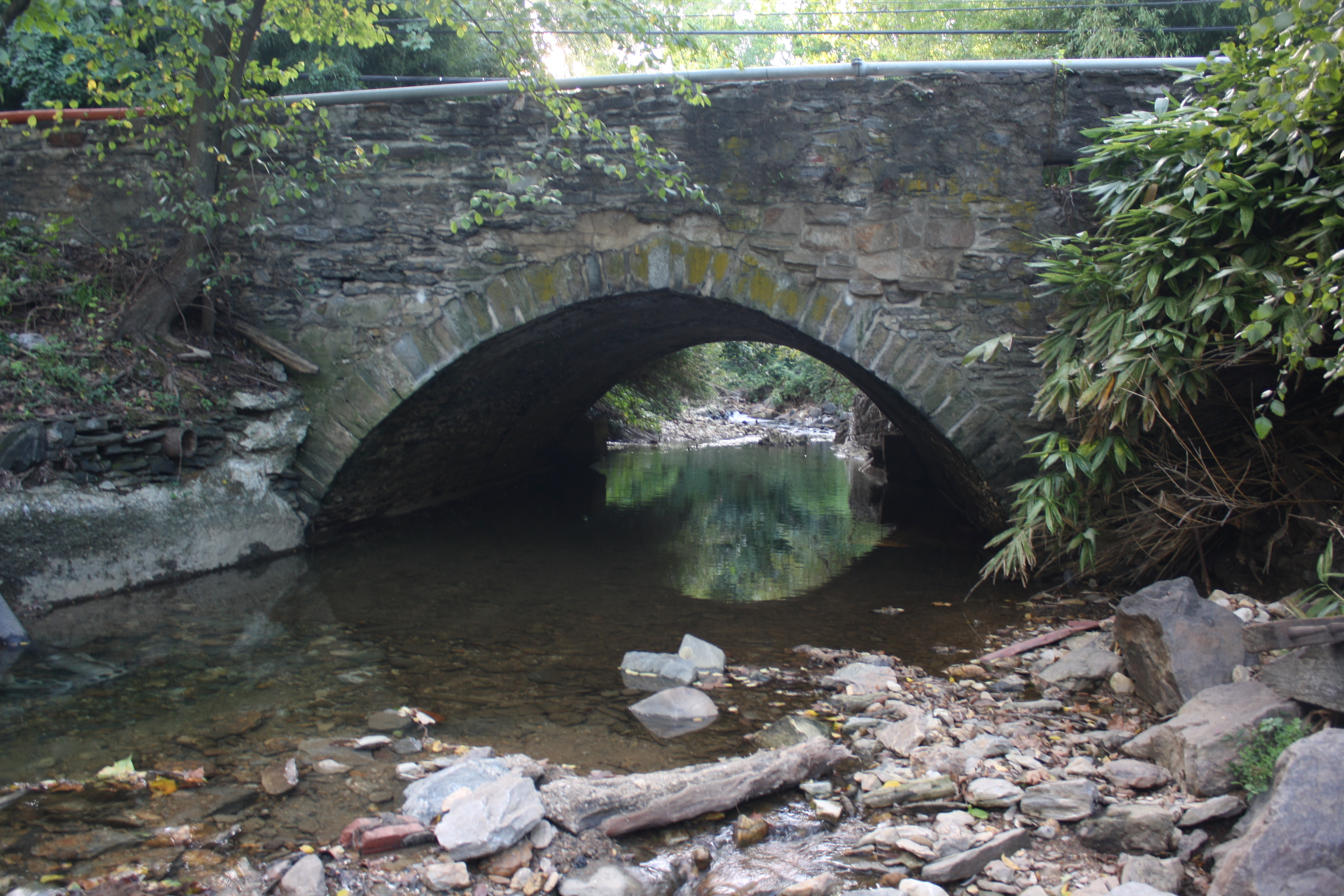
Gulph Creek runs under the 1789 stone bridge in Gulph Mills, Upper Merion Township, Pennsylvania.

Gulph Creek is a tributary of the Schuylkill River located in southeastern Pennsylvania, United States. Approximately 6 miles (9.7 km) long, it originates in Chester County, flows through Delaware County, and ends in Montgomery County. It is one of four watersheds in Radnor Township, alongside Ithan Creek, Darby Creek, and Meadowbrook Run.

== History ==
General George Washington and some 12,000 Continental Army troops camped in the Gulph Creek valley in December 1777, prior to their march to Valley Forge.

== Geography ==
Gulph Creek originates at an elevation of 410 feet (120 m) in Strafford, Chester County and flows east into Delaware County. Another branch begins in Tredyffrin Township, Chester County, and flows south. The branches merge in Radnor Township, Delaware County, just west of Eastern University. The creek flows east through the campus, then turns northeast as it approaches East County Line Road. It enters Montgomery County and continues northeast, before turning north to flow through the "gulph", a gorge flanked by 200-foot (61 m) hills. North of the "gulph" the creek turns east and flows through Gulph Mills and the borough of West Conshohocken, where it empties into the Schuylkill River.

As it flows through the "gulph", Gulph Creek parallels PA Route 320 and passes Hanging Rock, the ancient remnant of a collapsed natural arch.
