= Pennsylvania Route 320 =

State highway in Pennsylvania, US

Pennsylvania Route 320

Route information
- Maintained by PennDOT and Lower Merion Township
- Length: 18.832 mi (30.307 km)

Major junctions
- South end: US 13 / PA 291 in Chester
- US 13 Bus. in Chester; I-95 in Chester; PA 252 in Nether Providence Township; PA 420 in Springfield; US 1 in Springfield; PA 3 in Broomall; US 30 in Villanova; I-76 in Gulph Mills
- North end: PA 23 in Swedeland

Location
- Country: United States
- State: Pennsylvania
- Counties: Delaware, Montgomery

Highway system
- Pennsylvania State Route System; Interstate; US; State; Scenic; Legislative
← PA 319	→ PA 321

Pennsylvania Route 320 (PA 320) is a north–south state highway in southeastern Pennsylvania. The southern terminus of the 18.8-mile (30.3 km) long route is at U.S. Route 13 (US 13)/PA 291 in Chester. The northern terminus is at PA 23 in Swedeland. The route passes through suburban areas in Delaware and Montgomery counties to the west of Philadelphia, serving Swarthmore, Springfield, Broomall, Villanova, and Gulph Mills. PA 320 intersects many important highways including US 13 Business (US 13 Bus.) and Interstate 95 (I-95) in Chester, US 1 in Springfield, US 30 in Villanova, and I-76 in Gulph Mills. PA 320 runs parallel to I-476 (Mid-County Expressway) for much of its length and crosses it four times. Even though there are no direct interchanges between I-476 and PA 320, several roads that intersect PA 320 provide access to I-476.

The southernmost part of PA 320 was built as part of the Providence Road in 1684. PA 320 was first designated by 1928 between US 13 (now US 13 Bus.) in Chester and PA 23 in Lower Merion Township. PA 320 was extended south to PA 291 by 1940. The route was extended north to US 202 in Bridgeport via West Conshohocken by 1960. By 1967, the northern portion of the route was realigned to its current routing, replacing parts of PA 23 Alternate (PA 23 Alt.) and PA 23 and following part of former PA 123, with PA 23 rerouted to replace the part of PA 320 from southeast of West Conshohocken to Bridgeport. The nearby I-476 opened in 1991, reducing traffic levels on PA 320.

== Route description ==
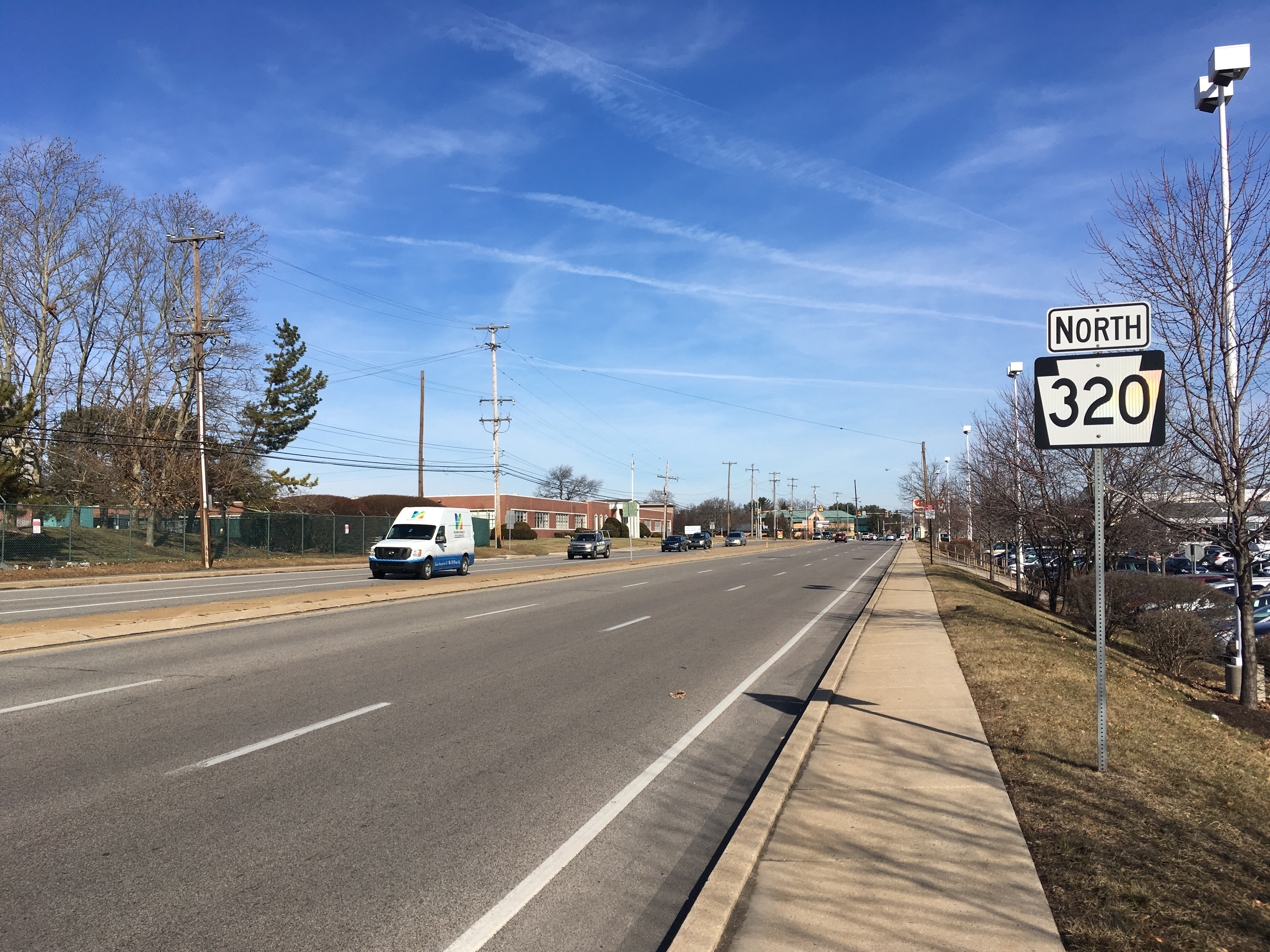
PA 320 northbound past PA 420 in Springfield Township

The southern terminus of PA 320 is at US 13/PA 291 in the city of Chester in Delaware County. From this point, PA 320 follows the one-way pair of Madison Street northbound and Upland Street southbound, one block to the east. The streets head northwest through urban development, crossing under Amtrak's Northeast Corridor railroad line. The one-way pair intersects US 13 Bus. as it passes more urban rowhouses along with some grassy lots. PA 320 comes to an interchange with I-95 a block east of PA 352. This interchange has access to southbound I-95 and from northbound I-95 from both PA 320 and PA 352. Access to northbound I-95 and from southbound I-95 is provided by ramps connecting to Chestnut Street, with Chestnut Street and 12th Street providing access to PA 320 and PA 352. The route passes over CSX's Philadelphia Subdivision railroad line immediately after crossing over I-95. In the vicinity of the I-95 interchange, northbound PA 320 follows Madison Street to Providence Avenue while southbound PA 320 follows 14th Street, Walnut Street, 13th Street, Chestnut Street, and 12th Street to get from Providence Avenue to Upland Street. Past I-95, both directions of PA 320 continue north on four-lane undivided Providence Avenue. The road passes homes and businesses, running to the west of Widener University, with a brief stretch of divided highway at the 15th Street intersection. The route narrows to two lanes and crosses the Ridley Creek, at which point it leaves Chester and enters Nether Providence Township. Here, the route becomes Providence Road and runs through suburban residential areas. PA 320 intersects the southern terminus of PA 252, at which point PA 252 continues north along Providence Road and PA 320 heads northeast on Chester Road.

The route runs between homes to the southeast and the Springhaven Country Club to the northwest with one northbound lane and two southbound lanes. PA 320 becomes a three-lane road with a center left-turn lane and comes to a bridge over Crum Creek, where it enters a small exclave of Springfield Township, and I-476. The road curves north through areas of residences and businesses, crossing into the borough of Swarthmore at the Fairview Road intersection. Here, PA 320 becomes a two-lane road and passes through wooded areas of homes. The road heads between Swarthmore College to the west and commercial areas to the east and reaches a roundabout with Field House Lane/Rutgers Avenue before it passes under SEPTA's Media/Wawa Line at the Swarthmore station. The route runs through more of the college campus before heading back into wooded neighborhoods. PA 320 turns northwest onto Swarthmore Avenue for one block before turning north onto Cedar Lane and coming to an intersection with Baltimore Pike.

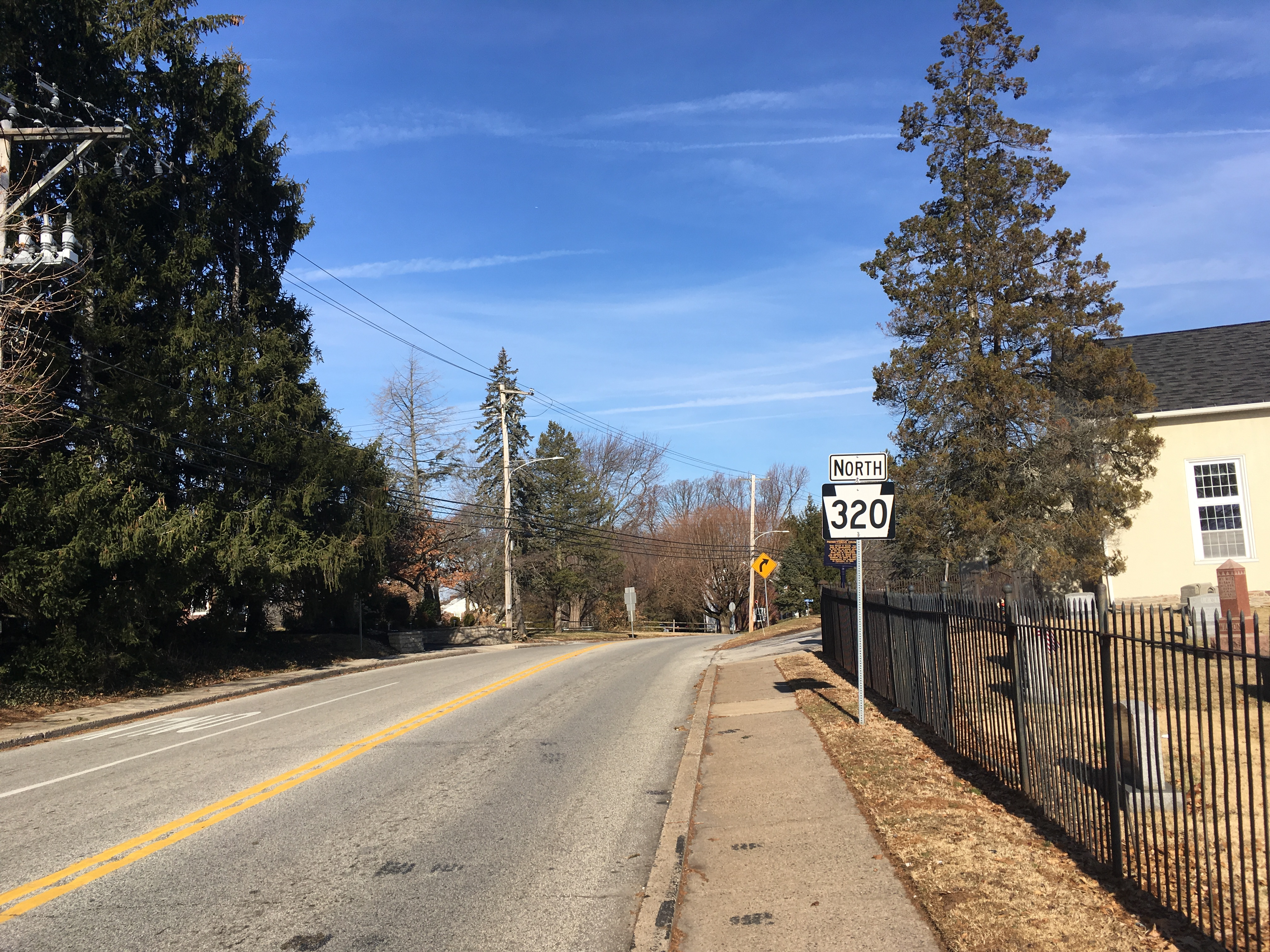
PA 320 northbound in Broomall

Following this intersection, the route heads back into Springfield Township and becomes Sproul Road, widening into a four-lane divided highway and passing between the Springfield Mall to the west and a residential neighborhood to the east. The route narrows back into a two-lane undivided road and comes to a bridge over SEPTA's light rail Media–Sharon Hill Line east of the Springfield Mall station. The road continues north through residential areas with some commercial development, passing to the east of Springfield Hospital and Springfield Golf and Country Club. PA 320 widens back to a four-lane divided highway and intersects the northern terminus of PA 420, at which point it heads into business areas. The route continues north to a diamond interchange with US 1.

Past the US 1 interchange, PA 320 passes more commercial establishments and crosses into Marple Township, becoming a four-lane undivided road. The route passes over I-476 again and intersects Springfield Road immediately after that, at which point it becomes a five-lane road with a center left-turn lane and passes between a large cemetery to the west and Cardinal O'Hara High School and some woods to the east. The road becomes a four-lane divided highway as it runs past businesses along with some nearby residential areas. PA 320 curves northwest before turning northeast to remain along Sproul Road, with Springfield Road continuing to the northwest. The route heads north through residential areas as a two-lane undivided road before coming to an intersection with PA 3 in commercial areas in the community of Broomall. Past this intersection, PA 320 heads northeast past more homes, turning north to continue along Sproul Road. The road runs through wooded residential areas, crossing the Darby Creek into Haverford Township. The route continues through the corner of Haverford Township, intersecting the western terminus of Darby Road before it heads into Radnor Township.

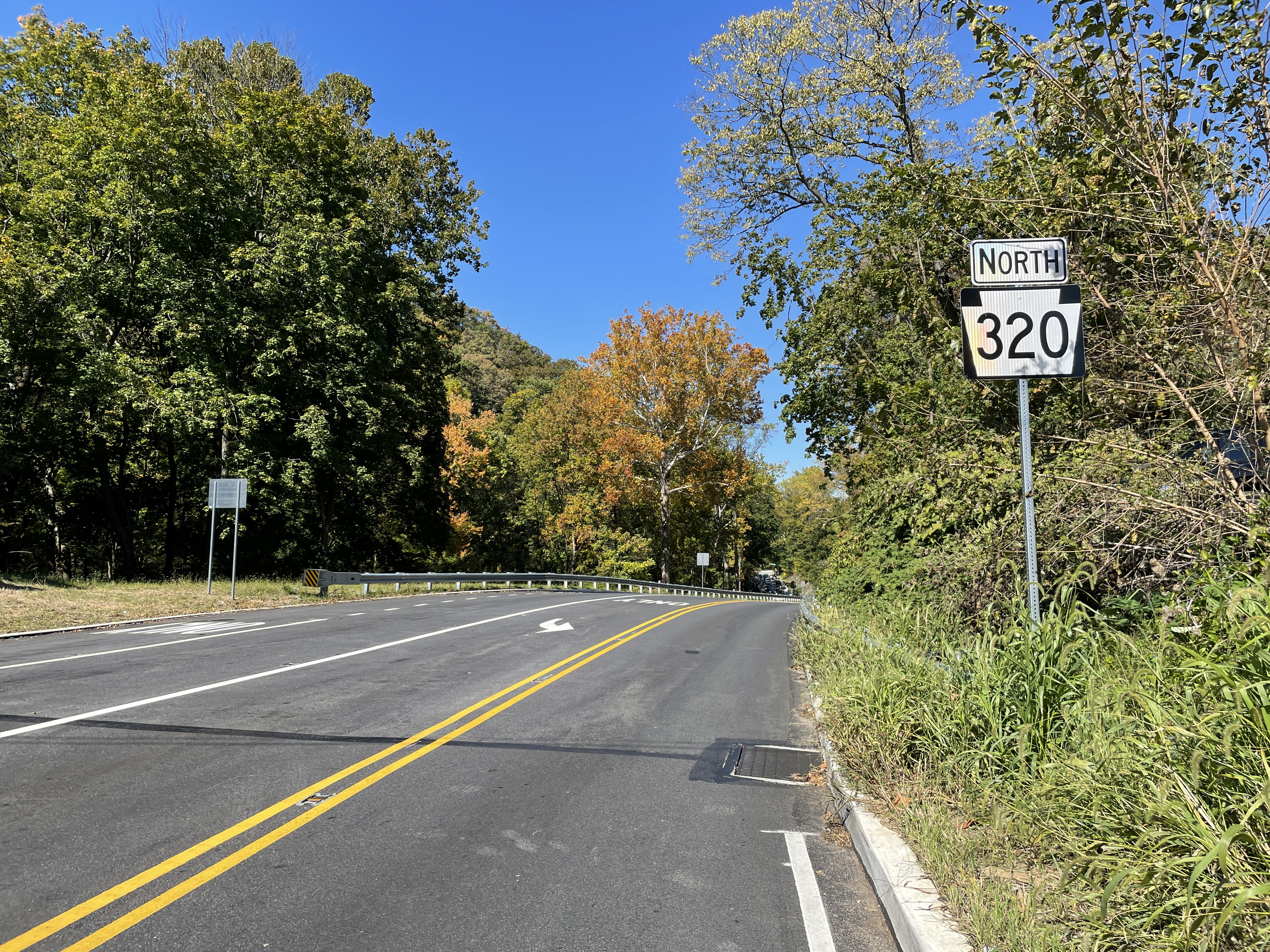
PA 320 northbound in Gulph Mills

PA 320 continues north through forested residential areas, passing to the east of Overbrook Golf Club and the Academy of Notre Dame de Namur school and to the west of Radnor Valley Country Club. The road winds northeast and crosses Ithan Creek before it comes to an intersection with Conestoga Road under a bridge carrying I-476. The route heads northeast and passes under SEPTA's Norristown High Speed Line before coming to an intersection with US 30 (Lancaster Avenue) in the community of Villanova. Following this, PA 320 becomes North Spring Mill Road and runs between residential neighborhoods to the northwest and Villanova University to the southeast. The road passes over Amtrak's Keystone Corridor railroad line west of the Villanova station serving SEPTA's Paoli/Thorndale Line, with a right-in/right-out access point serving the university and the station, before running through more of the university campus.

Upon crossing County Line Road, PA 320 enters Lower Merion Township in Montgomery County and continues east-northeast along Spring Mill Road through wooded residential areas. One block after County Line Road, PA 320 turns northwest onto Montgomery Avenue, curving north and crossing under I-476 again. The road passes under the Norristown High Speed Line north of the Matsonford station immediately before entering Upper Merion Township at the Matsonford Road intersection. Here, the route becomes South Gulph Road and runs through heavily wooded areas a short distance to the west of the rail transit line and east of Gulph Creek, passing west of Hanging Rock. PA 320 widens into a four-lane road and turns northeast onto two-lane Trinity Road at the point South Gulph Road reaches an interchange with I-76 (Schuylkill Expressway). Here, the route immediately passes under the Norristown High Speed Line and I-76 before crossing Gulph Creek and running through wooded residential areas in the community of Gulph Mills as Holstein Road. PA 320 turns northeast onto Swedeland Road and heads through industrial areas, coming to its northern terminus at an intersection with PA 23 in the community of Swedeland near the Schuylkill River north of the borough of West Conshohocken.

== History ==
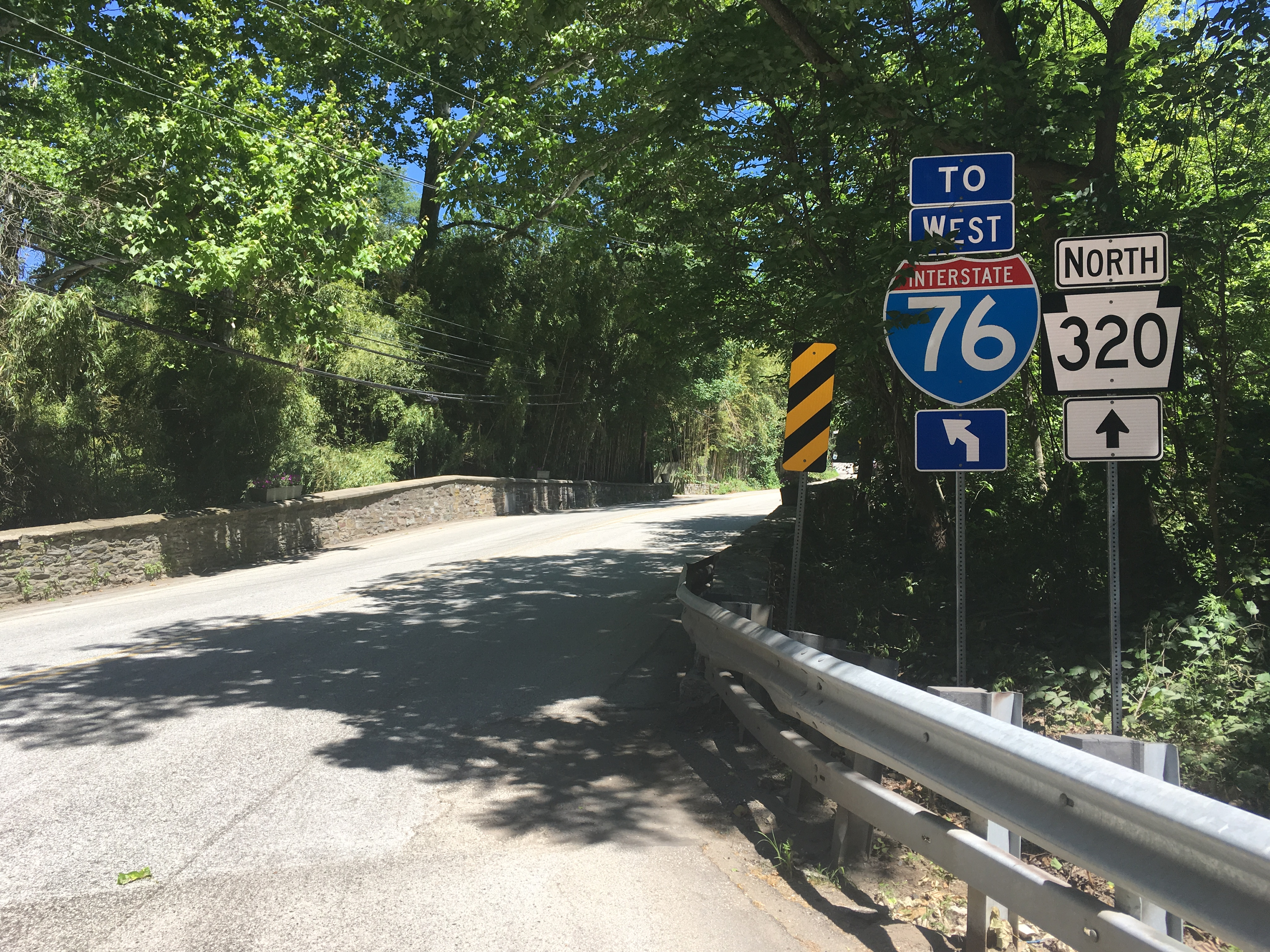
PA 320 northbound past I-76 in Gulph Mills

In 1683, the Court of Chester County (which originally comprised present-day Delaware County) approved the construction of "Providence Great Road", which comprised present-day PA 320 from Chester north to PA 252. The road was built to provide access to Chester from the north. The Providence Road was said to have been completed in 1684. When Pennsylvania first legislated routes in 1911, what would become PA 320 was legislated as part of Legislative Route 225, a route that ran from Chester to Bridgeport. PA 320 was first designated by 1928 to run from US 13/PA 91 (now US 13 Bus.) in Chester north to PA 23 at the intersection of Spring Mill Road and Montgomery Avenue in Lower Merion Township. At this time, the current route of PA 320 along Montgomery Avenue and Gulph Road was designated as a part of PA 23 while the route between Gulph Mills and Swedeland was designated as part of PA 123. By 1940, PA 320 was extended south to PA 291 in Chester. Also by this time, US 1 Bypass (US 1 Byp.) was designated concurrent with the route between US 1 (Baltimore Pike) and State Road. By 1950, the PA 123 designation was removed along the road north of Gulph Mills.

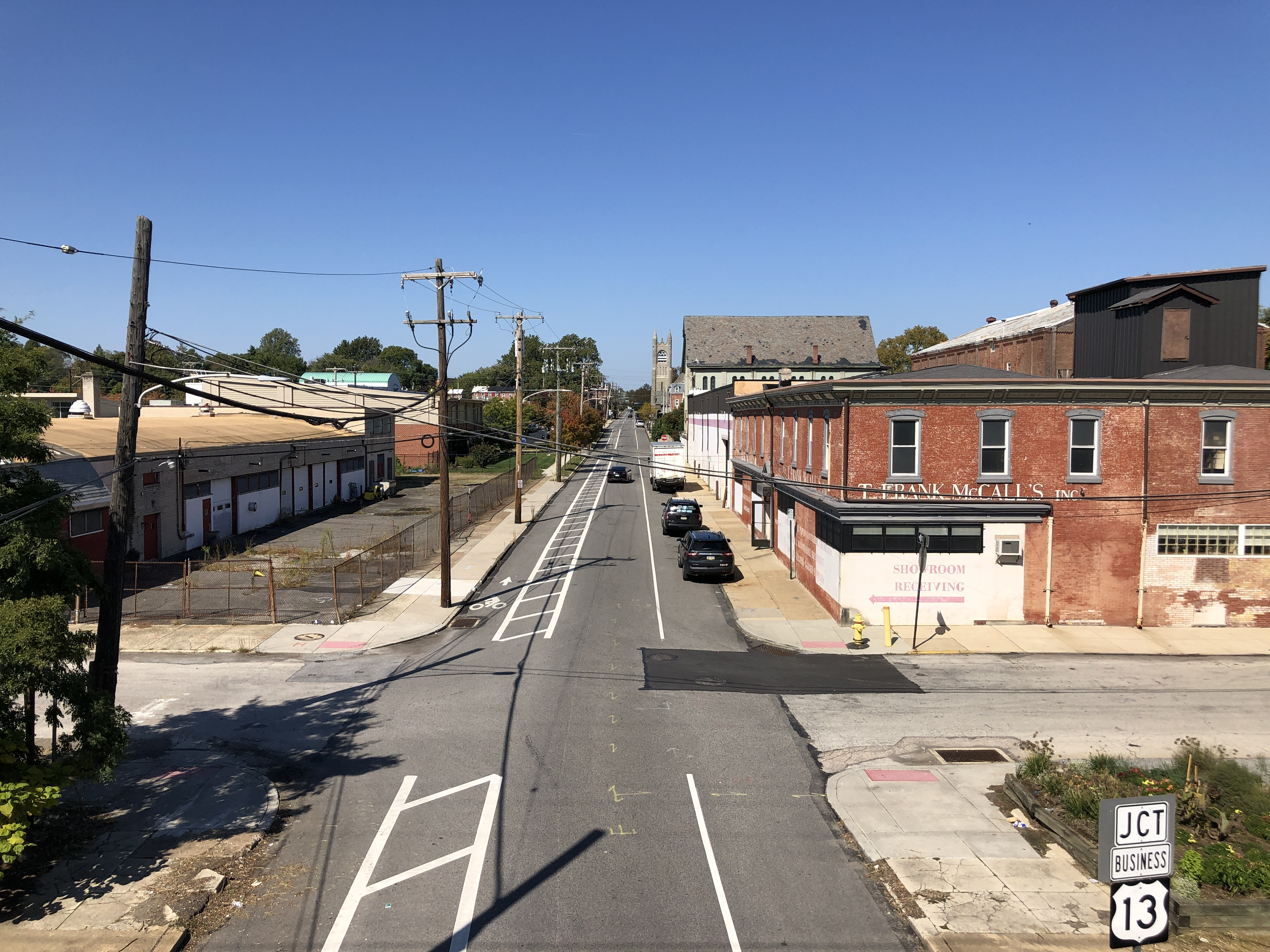
PA 320 northbound along Madison Street in Chester

PA 320 was extended north to US 202 in Bridgeport by 1960, continuing northeast along Spring Mill Road before turning northwest along the present-day PA 23 and passing through West Conshohocken before continuing to Bridgeport. The route followed part of the former PA 123 alignment between Swedeland and Bridgeport. Also by 1960, the US 1 Byp. concurrency was removed. PA 320 was rerouted to use its current alignment to reach its present northern terminus at a realigned PA 23 by 1967, replacing parts of PA 23 Alt. and PA 23 along Montgomery Avenue and South Gulph Road. PA 23 replaced the former PA 320 designation from southeast of West Conshohocken to Bridgeport. In the later part of the 20th century, PA 320 saw increasing traffic levels as it served as one of the main north–south routes through Delaware County. In 1991, the parallel I-476 (Mid-County Expressway) was opened to traffic after years of planning and construction, reducing traffic levels along PA 320. In January 2020, a construction project began to reconstruct and realign PA 320 away from Hanging Rock in Upper Merion Township. Construction was completed in June 2022 at a cost of $9.2 million.

== Major intersections ==
County	Location	mi	km	Destinations	Notes
Delaware	Chester	0.000	0.000	US 13 / PA 291	Southern terminus
Delaware	Chester	0.335	0.539	US 13 Bus. (9th Street)	
Delaware	Chester	0.599	0.964	I-95	Exit 6 on I-95
Delaware	Nether Providence Township	2.180	3.508	PA 252 north – Media	Southern terminus of PA 252
Delaware	Springfield Township	6.203	9.983	PA 420 south (Woodland Avenue)	Northern terminus of PA 420
Delaware	Springfield Township	6.509	10.475	US 1 to I-476	Interchange
Delaware	Marple Township	9.737	15.670	PA 3 (West Chester Pike) – Newtown Square, Upper Darby	
Delaware	Radnor Township	14.372	23.129	US 30 (Lancaster Avenue) to I-476	
Montgomery	Upper Merion Township	17.272	27.797	I-76 east – Philadelphia	No access to I-76 west; exit 330 on I-76
Montgomery	Upper Merion Township	18.832	30.307	PA 23 (River Road) – Bridgeport, Conshohocken	Northern terminus
1.000 mi = 1.609 km; 1.000 km = 0.621 mi: Incomplete access
