= Gulph Mills, Pennsylvania =

Unincorporated community in Pennsylvania, US

Gulph Mills
- Unincorporated community
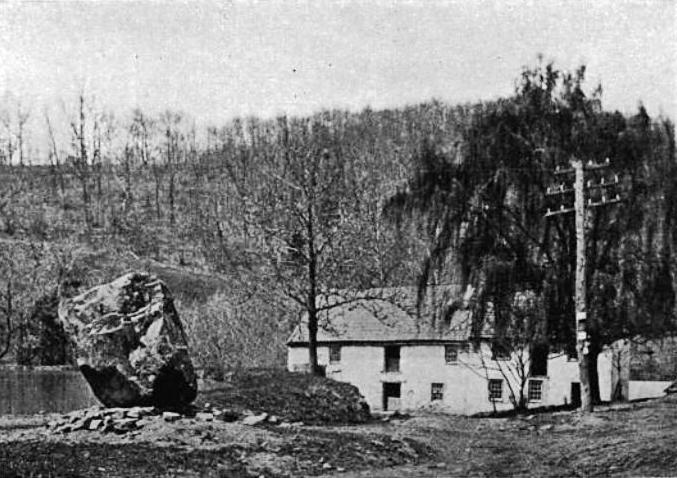
- This 1747 grist mill supplied flour to American soldiers at Valley Forge. The boulder (left) features a bronze plaque commemorating the Continental Army's December 1777 encampment at Gulph Mills. Photograph c.1922.

- Location of Gulph Mills in Pennsylvania Gulph Mills (the United States)
- Coordinates: 40°4′8″N 75°20′24″W
- Country: United States
- State: Pennsylvania
- County: Montgomery
- Township: Upper Merion
- Elevation: 148 ft (45 m)
- Time zone: UTC-5 (Eastern (EST))
  - Summer (DST): UTC-4 (EDT)
- ZIP Code: 19406
- Area codes: 610 and 484
- GNIS feature ID: 1176308

Gulph Mills is an unincorporated community in Upper Merion Township, Montgomery County, Pennsylvania. Located between the Borough of West Conshohocken and King of Prussia, it is served by the Upper Merion Area School District.

The Norristown High Speed Line has a station in Gulph Mills.

== History ==
Gulph Mills was an early industrial area, where mills were erected as early as the 1740s. Between the gorge and the Schuylkill River, Gulph Creek drops more than 25 feet over about 1.5 miles. At least three dams were built to harness the creek and provide steady waterpower for mills along its banks.

“Among those mills was a grist mill to make flour and corn meal, which was called the Gulph Mill; a sawmill to cut logs into lumber, a powder mill to manufacture gun powder, a textile mill to produce cloth, and a paper mill.”

=== Revolutionary War ===
The Continental Army created an ammunition depot at Gulph Mills prior to the October 4, 1777, Battle of Germantown. Located some 15 miles outside the (then) borders of Philadelphia, the hills surrounding the village made the depot defensible using relatively few troops.

The December 5–8, 1777, Battle of White Marsh was the year's last major engagement between British and American forces. General George Washington crossed to the west side of the Schuylkill River and made the Isaac Hughes House in Gulph Mills, later named "Poplar Lane", his headquarters. Gulph Mills was one of three sites he considered for the Continental Army's winter quarters, but Valley Forge, some 9 miles (14.5 km) west, was his final choice.

The main Continental Army assembled at Gulph Mills, beginning December 13, 1777. On December 19, it broke camp and some 12,000 soldiers marched en masse to winter quarters at Valley Forge.

Lieutenant-Colonel Aaron Burr remained at Gulph Mills, commanding a military picket at the south entrance to the gorge.

In 1892, the Gulph Mills encampment was commemorated by a monument erected by the Pennsylvania Society of Sons of the Revolution. It consists of a bronze plaque inlaid into a boulder.

=== Hanging Rock ===
Another attraction of Gulph Mills is "Hanging Rock," the surviving remnant of a natural arch created by Gulph Creek that collapsed millennia ago. Hanging Rock has long been associated with Washington and the Revolutionary War, because the main Continental Army passed by it on the march to Valley Forge. It is located in the gorge through which the creek and Pennsylvania Route 320 both pass. PennDOT has sought to remove Hanging Rock for safety reasons, but preservationists have battled such action since at least 1917.

In January 2020, a construction project began to reconstruct and realign PA 320 away from Hanging Rock. A gradual curve was added to the northbound lane to bypass the rock, and the southbound lane's curve was cantilevered outward over Gulph Creek. Construction was completed in June 2022 at a cost of $9.2 million.

Poplar Lane, the Stone Bridge over Gulph Creek (1789) and Hanging Rock are listed on the National Register of Historic Places.
