= Hanging Rock (Upper Merion Township, Pennsylvania) =

- U.S. National Register of Historic Places
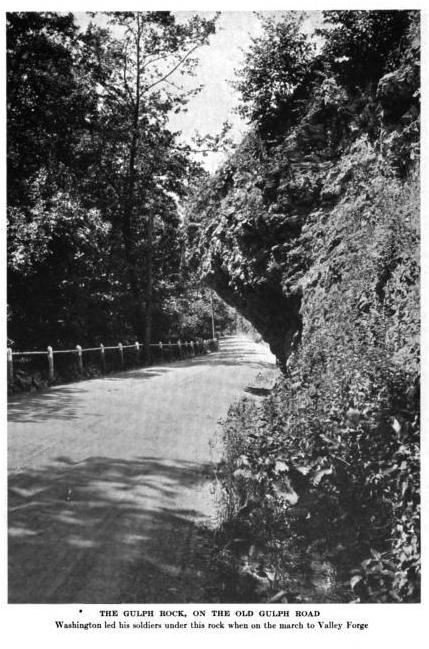
- Hanging Rock in 1917

- Location within Pennsylvania Location within the United States
- Location: 1144 S. Gulph Rd., Gulph Mills, Upper Merion Township, Pennsylvania
- Coordinates: 40°3′55″N 75°20′31″W
- Area: less than one acre
- NRHP reference No.: 97001251
- Added to NRHP: December 24, 1997

Hanging Rock, also known as "Overhanging Rock", "Gulph Rock," and "Drummond's Head", is a natural geologic feature in Gulph Mills, Upper Merion Township, Montgomery County, Pennsylvania. The outcropping of phyllite is the remnant of a natural arch eroded by Gulph Creek, that collapsed millennia ago.

The rock has long been associated with General George Washington and the Continental Army's December 1777 March to Valley Forge.

Hanging Rock was listed on the National Register of Historic Places in 1997.

== History and geographical features ==
The road passing under Hanging Rock, Pennsylvania Route 320 (South Gulph Road), was built between 1711 and 1712 to serve as a public highway.

General George Washington assembled the main body of the Continental Army at Gulph Mills, beginning December 13, 1777. On December 19, some 12,000 troops made the 9-mile March to Valley Forge for winter encampment, 1777–1778.

=== Historical associations ===
On December 19, 1924, the rock formation was dedicated as a memorial to that march by the Valley Forge Historical Society. An excerpt from the address:

One hundred and forty-seven years ago when Washington’s army, defeated and in despair, passed up the Gulph Road on their memorable and piteous march to Valley Forge, those half frozen, half naked, half starving men were not thinking of memorials. They were thinking most likely of death and the ruin of their cause. But God himself even then had set up a memorial eternal and lasting as the very hills of which it forms a part — the Overhanging Rock at Gulph Mills. Just as it witnessed the sufferings of Washington and his army so has it seen the progress and glory of this mighty Nation. No man-made monument can surpass it in beauty, or equal its power to arrest attention and fire the imagination. It is unique. It is impressive. It is one of Nature’s wonders. It tells a story which even he who runs may read — the story of the upbuilding of the American Public. It proclaims Gulph Mills as no other marker ever can or will. Once gone not all the art and science of our boasted 20th Century civilization can replace it. …

Let this memorial stand. Let it be a sign among you so that when your children ask “what means this stone”? tell them that an army of immortals passed through this gorge in defeat and despair, to even greater despair at Valley Forge, but that the spirit which sustained them there, and out of it “the life of America arose regenerate and free.”

— J. Aubrey Anderson, Esq., “The Overhanging Rock at Gulph Mills,” address given at the December 19, 1924 dedication of the rock by the Valley Forge Historical Society.

=== Alterations and accommodations ===
In 1917 and 1954, dynamite was used to reduce Hanging Rock's protrusion into the space above the roadway. The "overhang" of the rock was significantly decreased by these actions, and erosion and trucks sideswiping the rock have further changed its shape over the years.

In January 2022, PennDot began a project to realign Route 320 (South Gulph Road) away from Hanging Rock. A gradual curve in the north-bound lane was built around the rock, which required the south-bound lane to be cantilevered outward over Gulph Creek. The project was completed in June 2022.

== Gallery ==
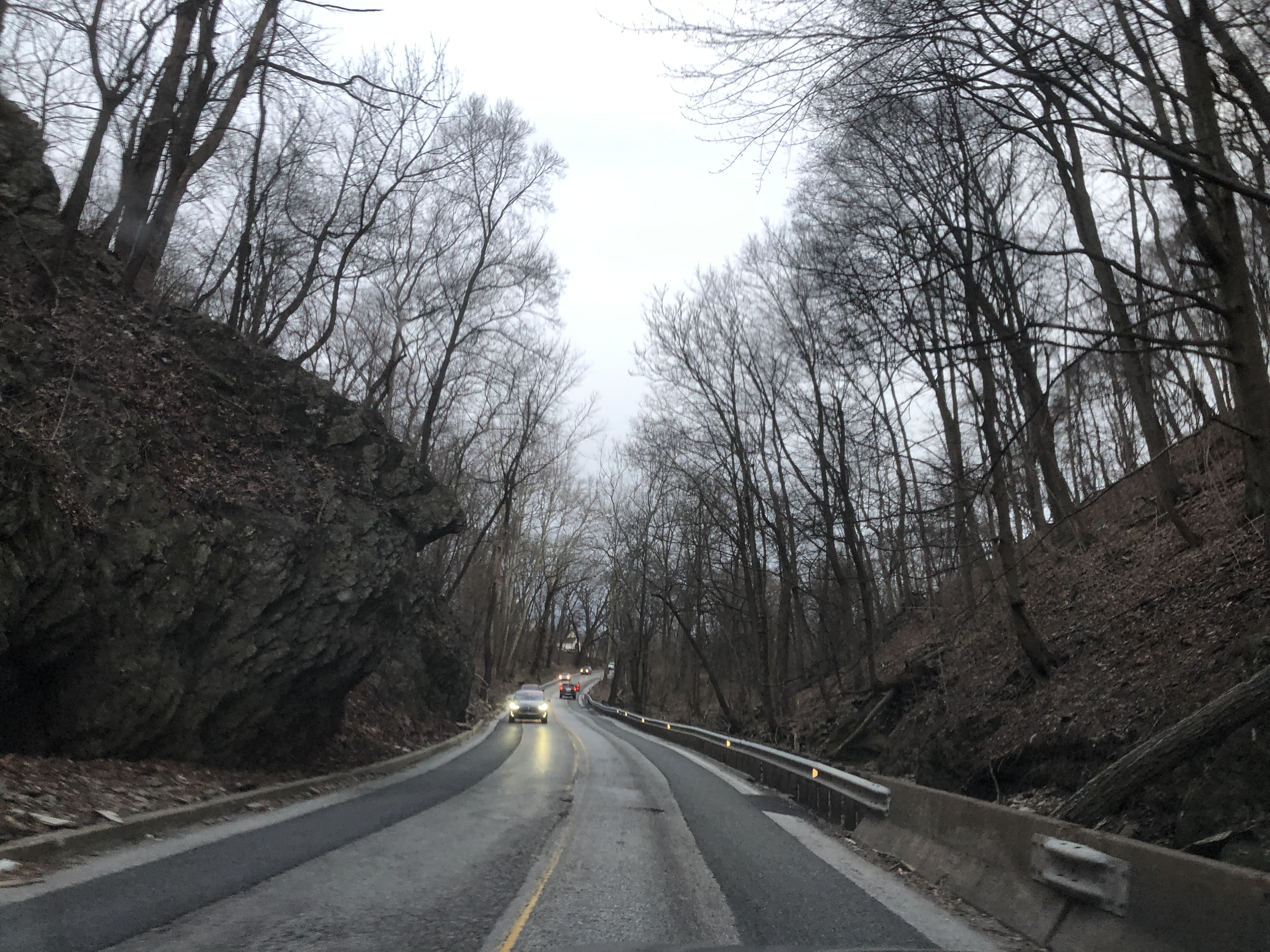
Hanging Rock, looking south on PA Route 320, 2019

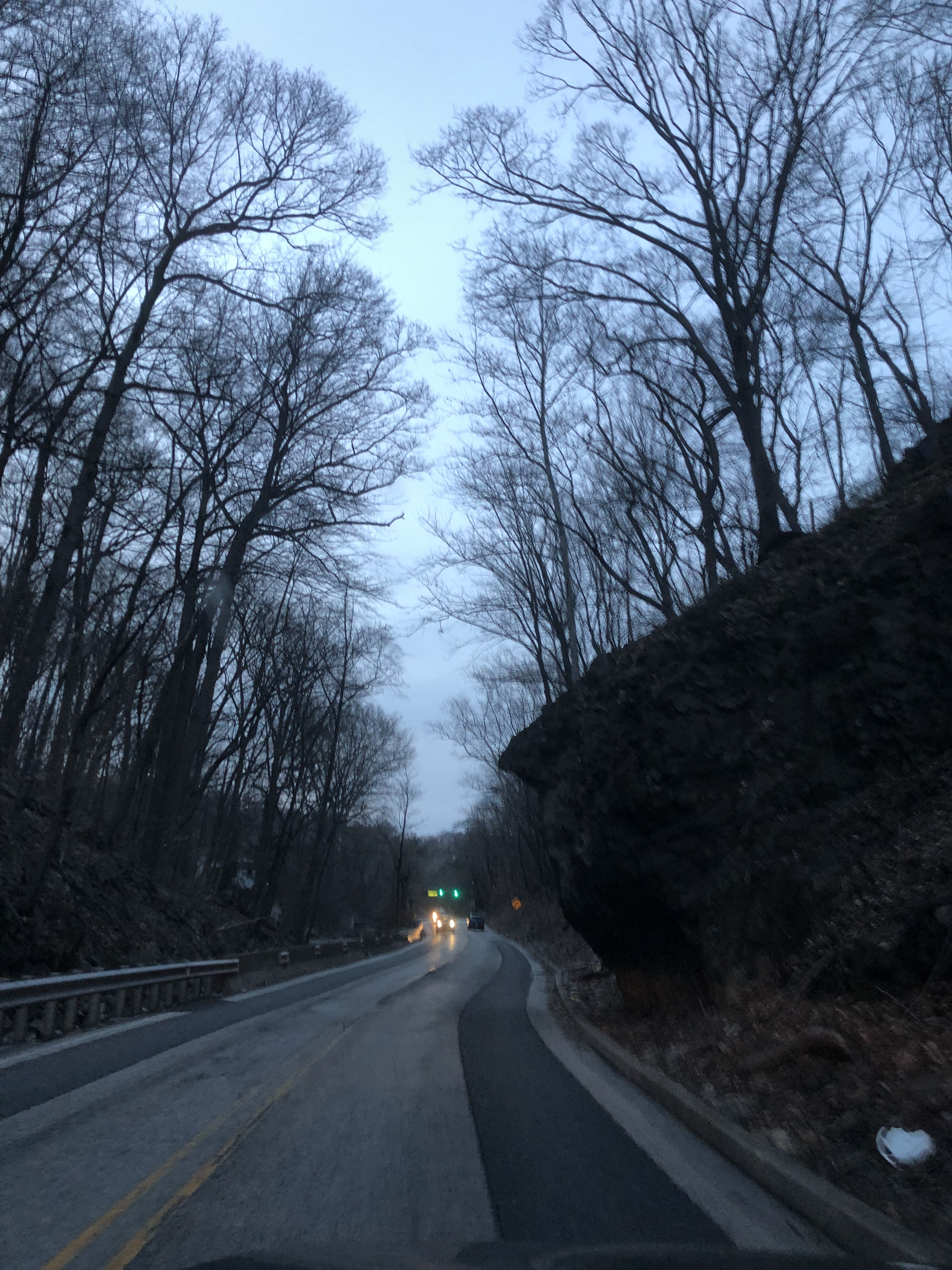
Hanging Rock, looking north on PA Route 320, 2019
