= Poplar Lane =

Historic house in Pennsylvania, United States

- U.S. National Register of Historic Places
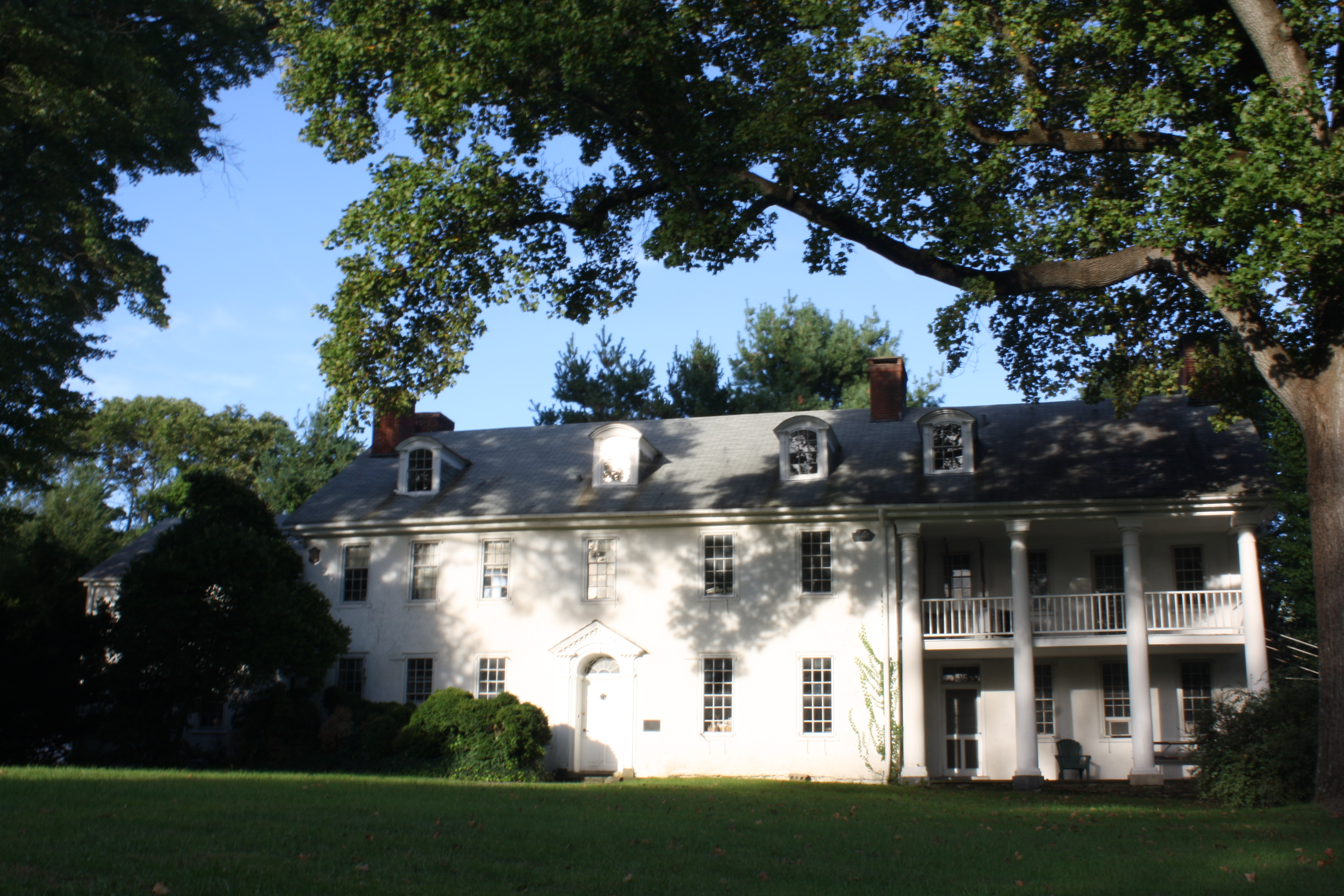
- Poplar Lane. September 2012.

- Location within Pennsylvania Location within the United States
- Location: 1000 Boxwood Ct., Gulph Mills, Upper Merion Township, Pennsylvania
- Coordinates: 40°4′13.6″N 75°20′17.4″W
- Area: 1.5 acres (0.61 ha)
- Built: 1758, 1816, c. 1821
- NRHP reference No.: 78002436
- Added to NRHP: May 22, 1978

"Poplar Lane", also known as "Ballygomingo", is a historic house in Gulph Mills, Upper Merion Township, Montgomery County, Pennsylvania. It served as General George Washington's headquarters in December 1778, prior to the Continental Army's march to winter quarters at Valley Forge.

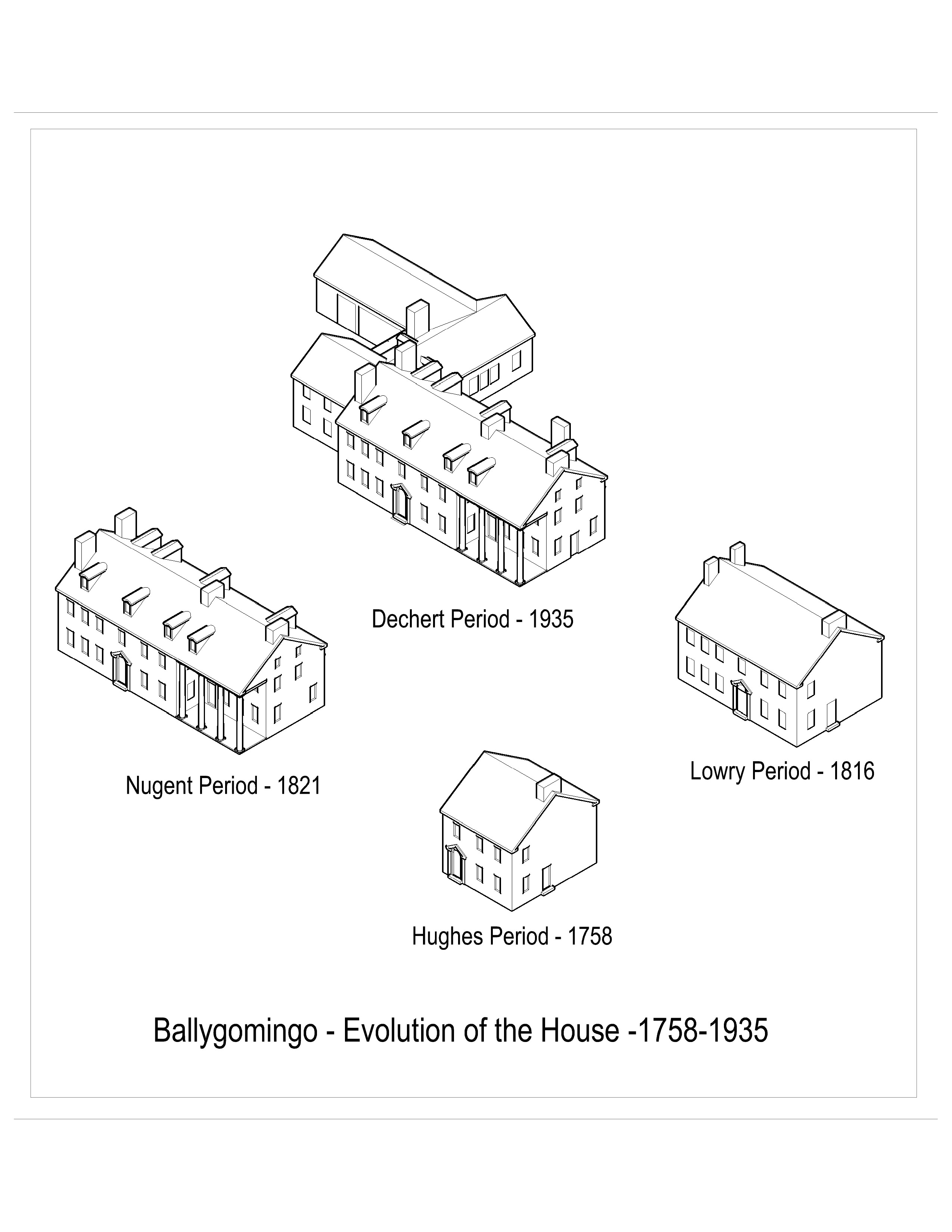
Principal Phases of Construction 1759-2022

The original house seems to have been three bays wide, and was built in 1758. It was widened to six bays in 1816, resulting in an asymmetrical facade. The four-bay wing with the two-story portico was added about 1821.

The current house is a 10-bay, two-and-a-half-story stone building faced with stucco. This includes the 1821 wing, that features a two-story portico with balcony that screens a spacious living room below and a bedroom suite above.

Poplar Lane was added to the National Register of Historic Places in 1978.

== Evolution ==
Comprehensive architectural surveys conducted between 2021 and 2023 have detailed the building's multiple expansions since its initial construction. These have corroborated five major phases of development, as documented in 19th and 20th-century sources and maps.

Poplar Lane's second owner was Thomas Lowry, who doubled the width of the building to six bays during his brief period of ownership. He was followed by George Nugent, who added the South Wing and its columned portico. During the later 19th century, further small additions and outbuildings were added by the Varian family (see Faris and the property atlases). The 1917 photograph in Faris may have been retouched to obscure a small kitchen wing that was enlarged by the next owner, Robert Dechert.

=== 20th Century ===
Robert Dechert was a successful lawyer in Philadelphia who bought the property in 1935. He added a large library, kitchen wing and garage. The architect for this work has not been identified. Some of the woods and wild areas on the grounds were cleared for gardens. Between 1935 and 1965, older damaged trees were removed for new specimen trees, including a cedar of Lebanon and a Chinese sequoia. As of 2025, only one of the Lombardy poplar trees that gave the name "Poplar Lane" to the property remains.

The property was subdivided in the mid-1970s, which left the house on a 1.5-acre lot that included the main residence and a large subterranean icehouse. W. Graham Arader III purchased the house in 1977. The architectural additions since then included the conversion of the garage to a storage area and a further one-story storage area in new construction. A comprehensive interior and exterior restoration and rehabilitation occurred between 2021 and 2023. During this work, a detailed interior and exterior architectural survey documented the changes in this and previous phases. The building now (2025) houses a gallery with maps, art, prints, furniture and rare books from the 18th and 19th centuries with a special focus on the American Revolutionary War and Pennsylvania history.

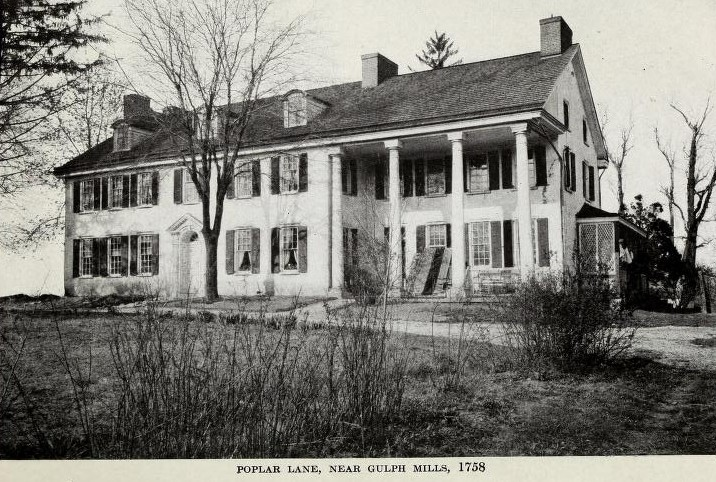
Poplar Lane in 1917

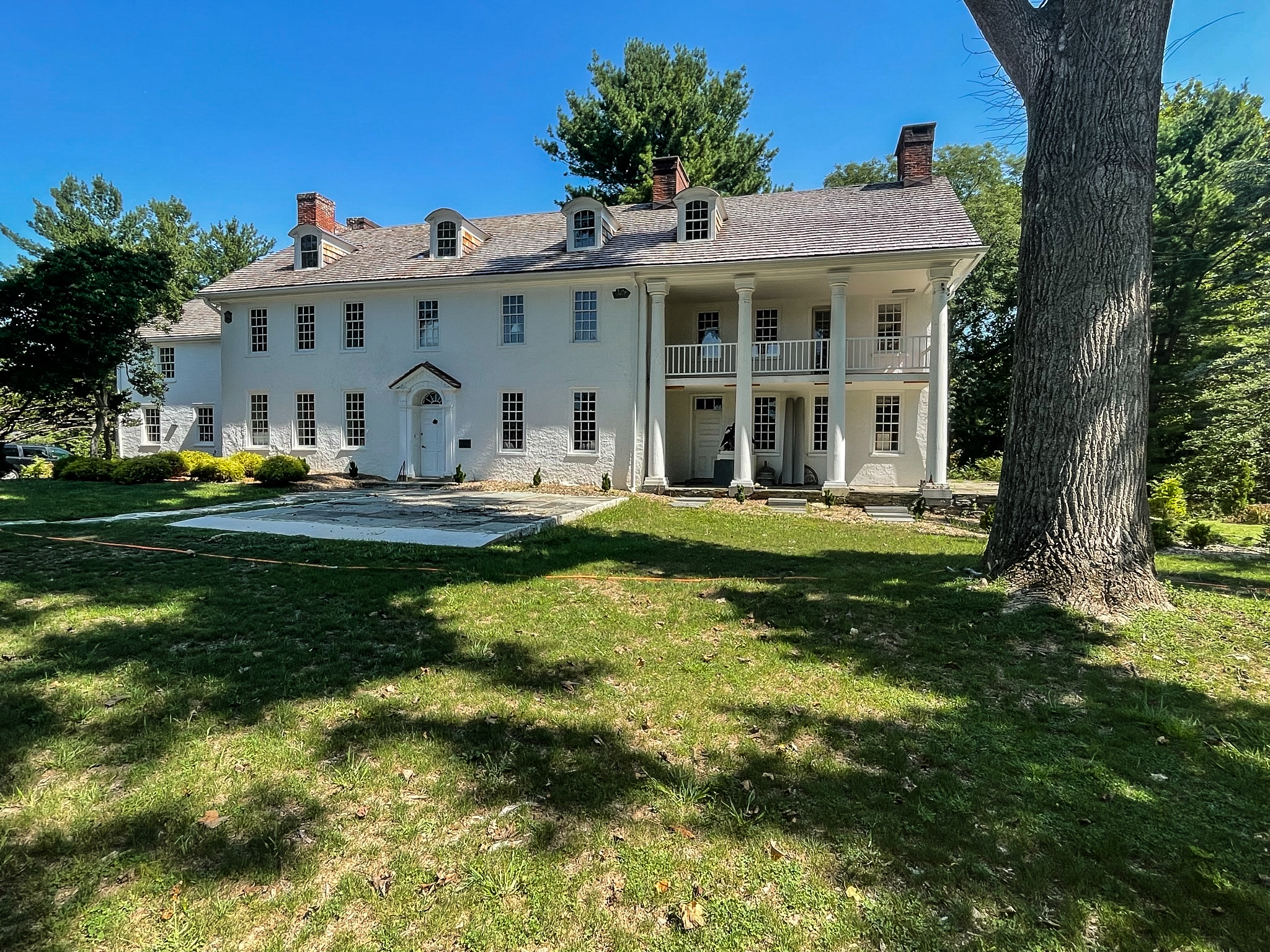
Facade from the south (2022)

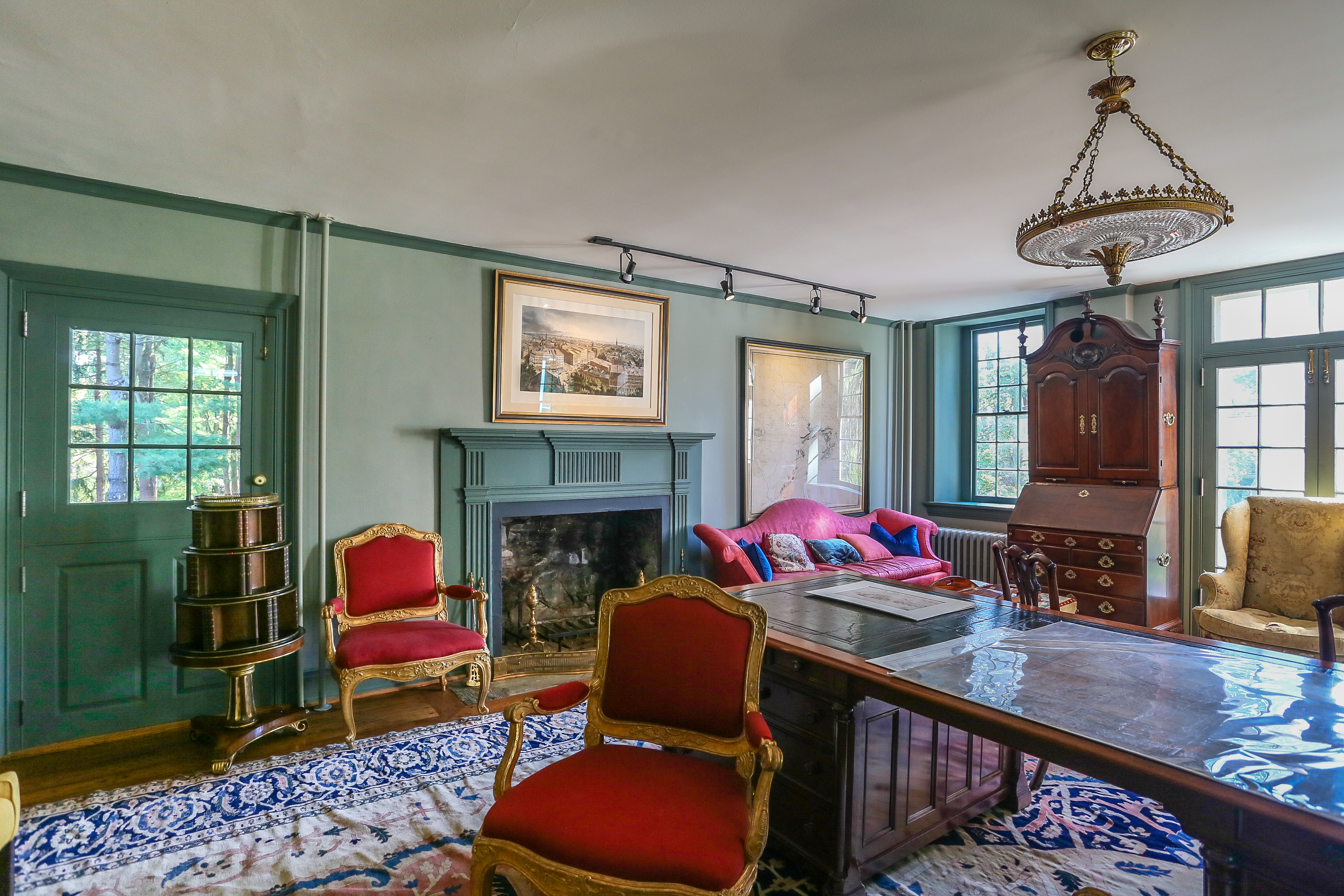
Living Room with fireplace relocated by Robert Dechert (1935)

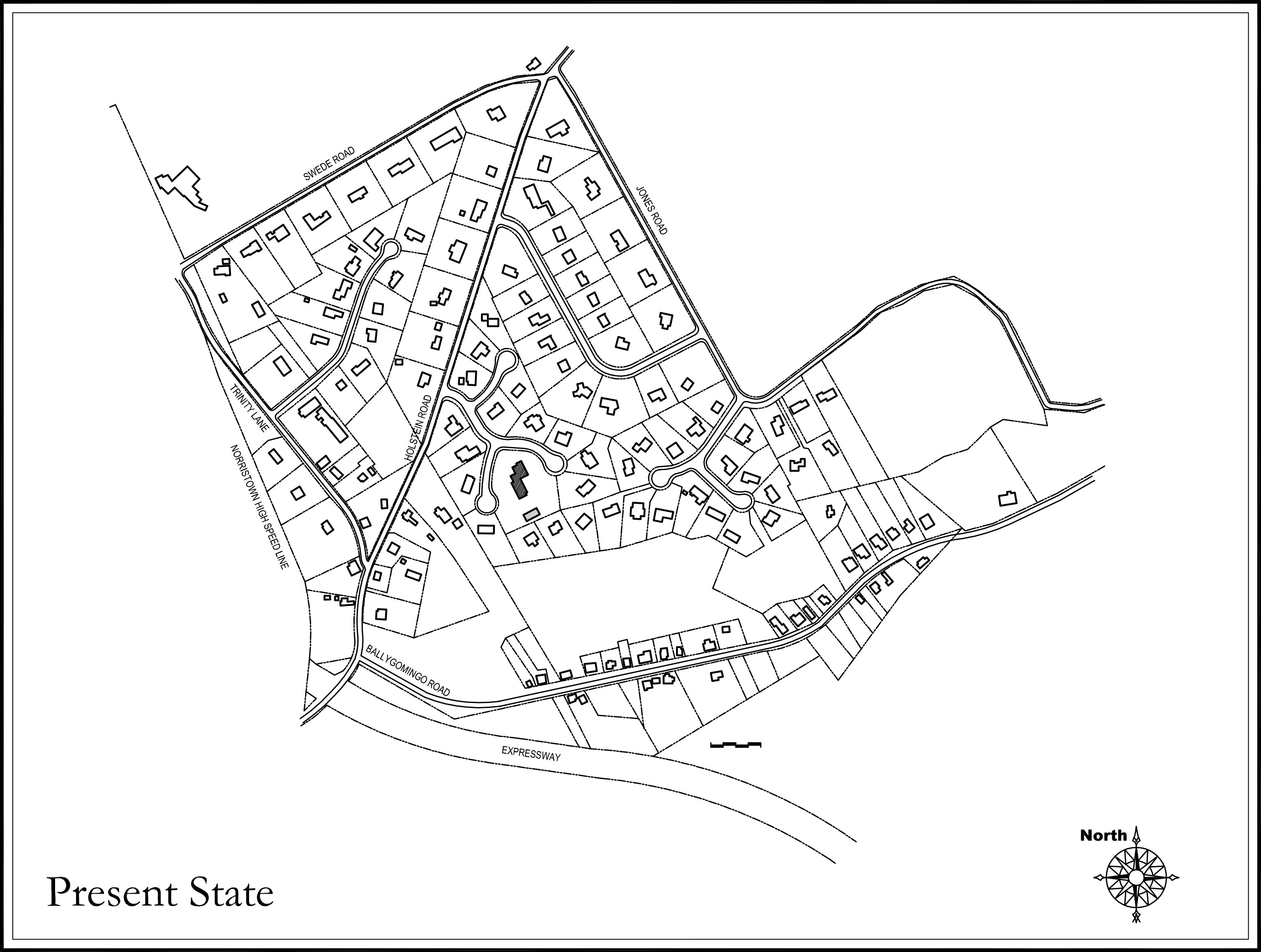
2022 Site plan in current subdivision
