= Bridge in Upper Merion Township =

Bridge in Pennsylvania, United States

- U.S. National Register of Historic Places
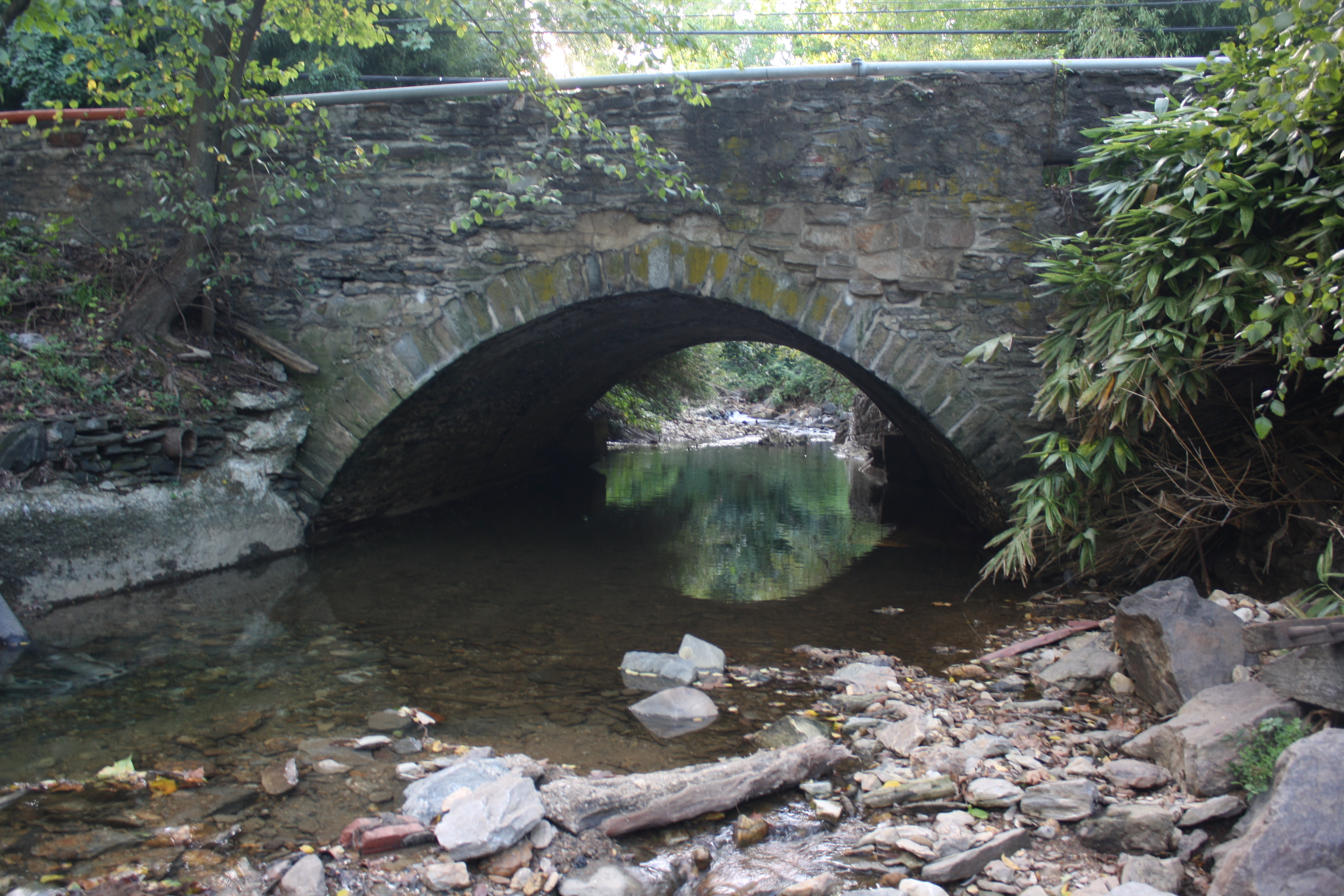
- Bridge in Upper Merion Township in September 2012

- Location within Pennsylvania Location within the United States
- Location: Trinity Ln. over Gulph Creek, Gulph Mills, Upper Merion Township, Pennsylvania, U.S.
- Coordinates: 40°4′8″N 75°20′28″W
- Area: less than one acre
- Built: 1789
- Architectural style: Small-span stone arch
- MPS: Highway Bridges Owned by the Commonwealth of Pennsylvania, Department of Transportation TR
- NRHP reference No.: 88000832
- Added to NRHP: June 22, 1988

Bridge in Upper Merion Township is a historic stone arch bridge located at Gulph Mills in Upper Merion Township, Pennsylvania, now known as the "Trinity Lane Bridge". The bridge crosses Gulph Creek, and was built in 1789. It has a single 20-foot-long (6.1 m) span with a width of 34 feet (10.4 m), and an overall length of 100-foot (30 m).

The bridge's datestone features an archaic spelling of "Federal":

Montgomery
County
Upper Merion
Township.
1789.
In the 2nd year the
Foederal [sic] Union.

The Bridge in Upper Merion was listed on the National Register of Historic Places in 1988. As of August 2021, it was the fifth-oldest bridge in use in the United States.

In 2021, the bridge structure was repaired and rehabilitated by contractor J.D. Eckman, with 100% funding from the Pennsylvania Department of Transportation, also known as PennDOT.

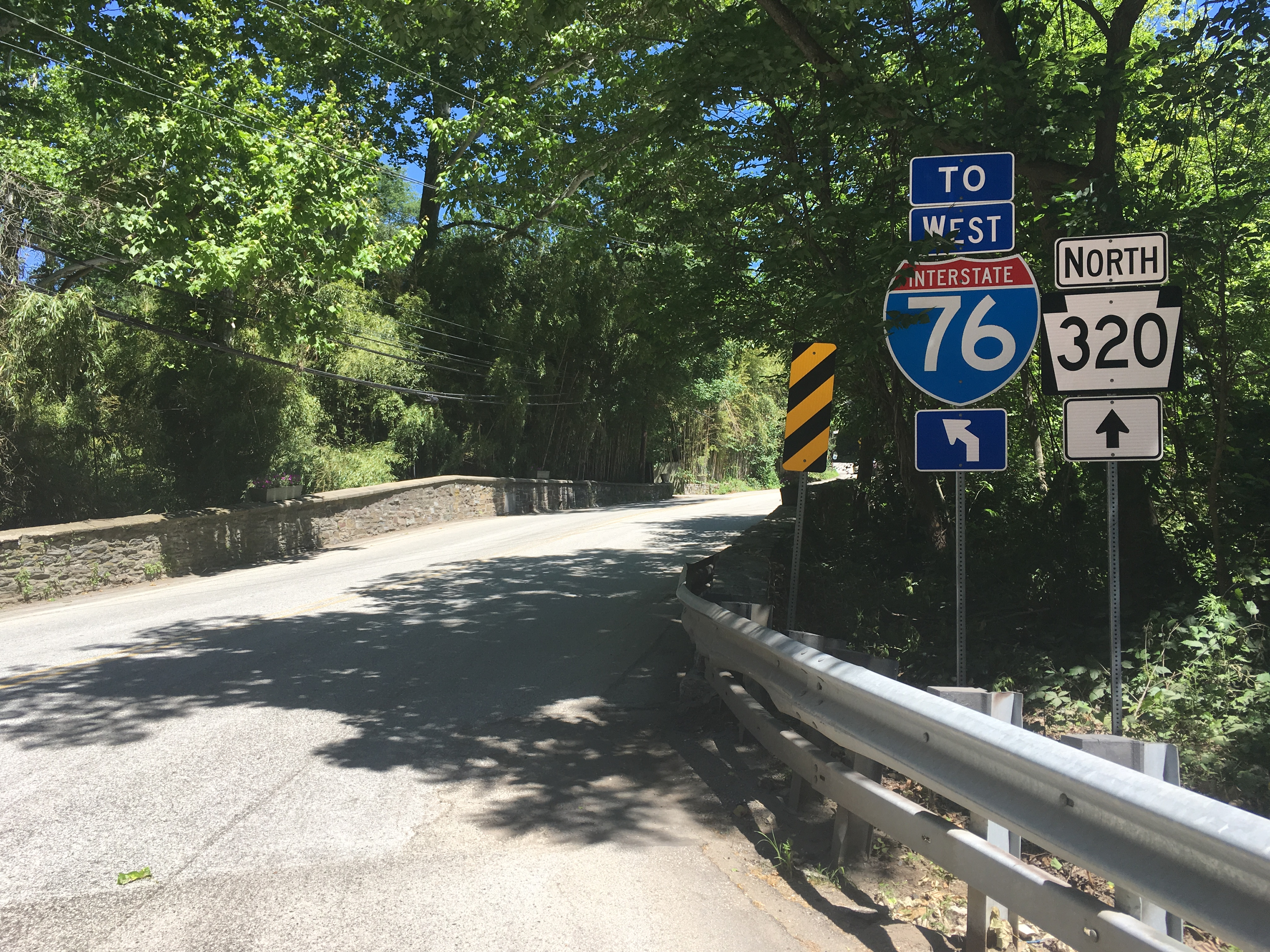
The bridge looking northwest, from Balligomingo Road. Following the rerouting of South Gulph Road to bypass Gulph Mills, this section of PA Rte 320 North was renamed Trinity Lane.

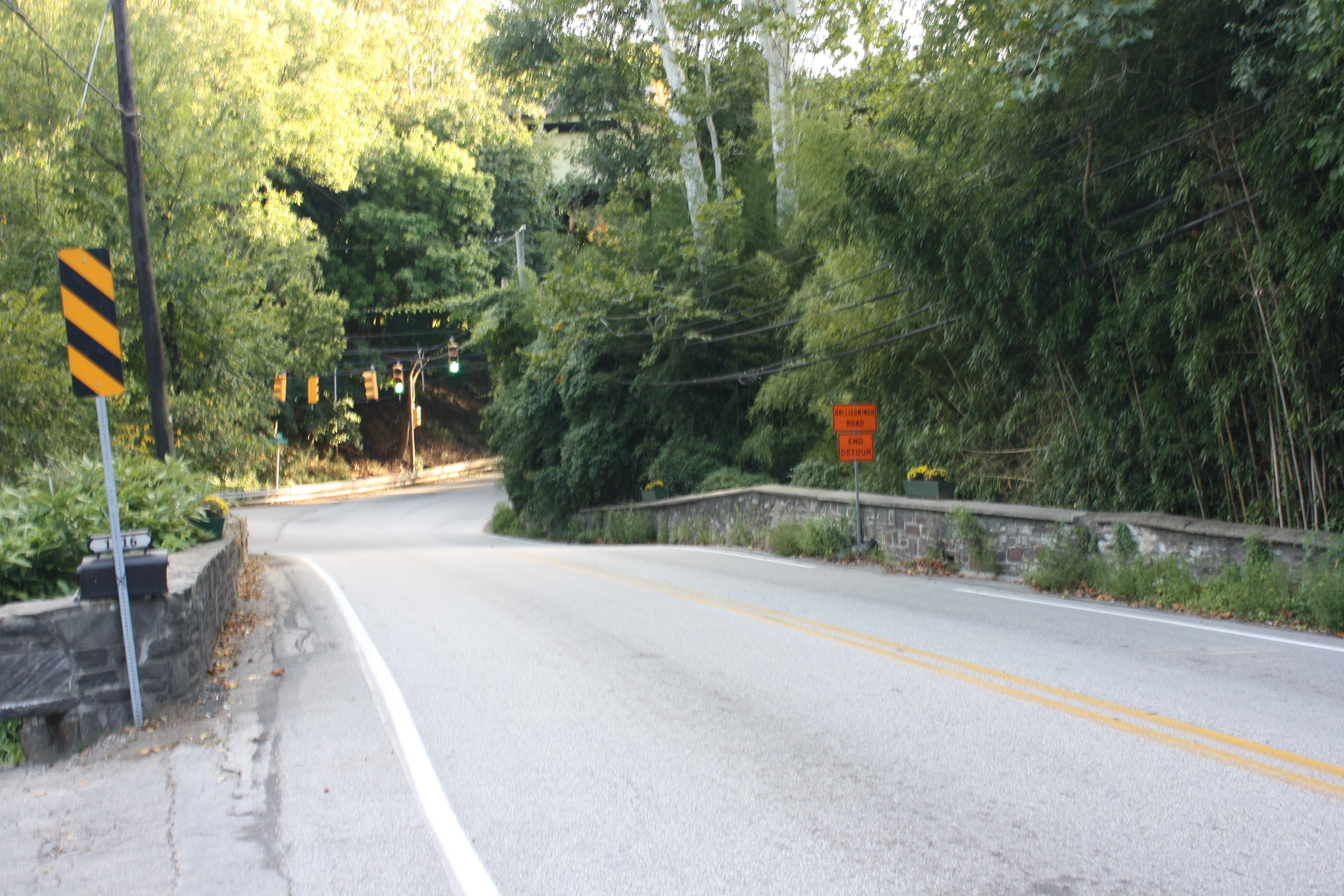
The bridge looking southeast, to the intersection with Balligomingo Road (background, left).
