= Cheswold Lane Asset Management =

Defunct American mutual fund company

- Type: Private
- Industry: Investment Management
- Headquarters: West Conshohocken, Pennsylvania
- Website: www.cheswoldlane.com

Cheswold Lane Asset Management was a mutual fund company founded in 2006 by Colleen Quinn Scharpf, Eric Scharpf and Matthew Taylor and headquartered in West Conshohocken, Pennsylvania, United States. They offered an international high dividend strategy, focused on developed markets in Europe and Asia. They managed both separate accounts and a no-load mutual fund: the Cheswold Lane International High Dividend Fund equity fund.

The company was named for the Cheswold estate, the Haverford, PA summer home of AJ Cassatt, the 7th President of the Pennsylvania Railroad. Cheswold Lane was located adjacent to the former grounds of the Cheswold estate and the current site of the Merion Cricket Club. The firm closed in April 2016.
