= Upper Merion Township, Pennsylvania =

Township in Pennsylvania, US

- Township
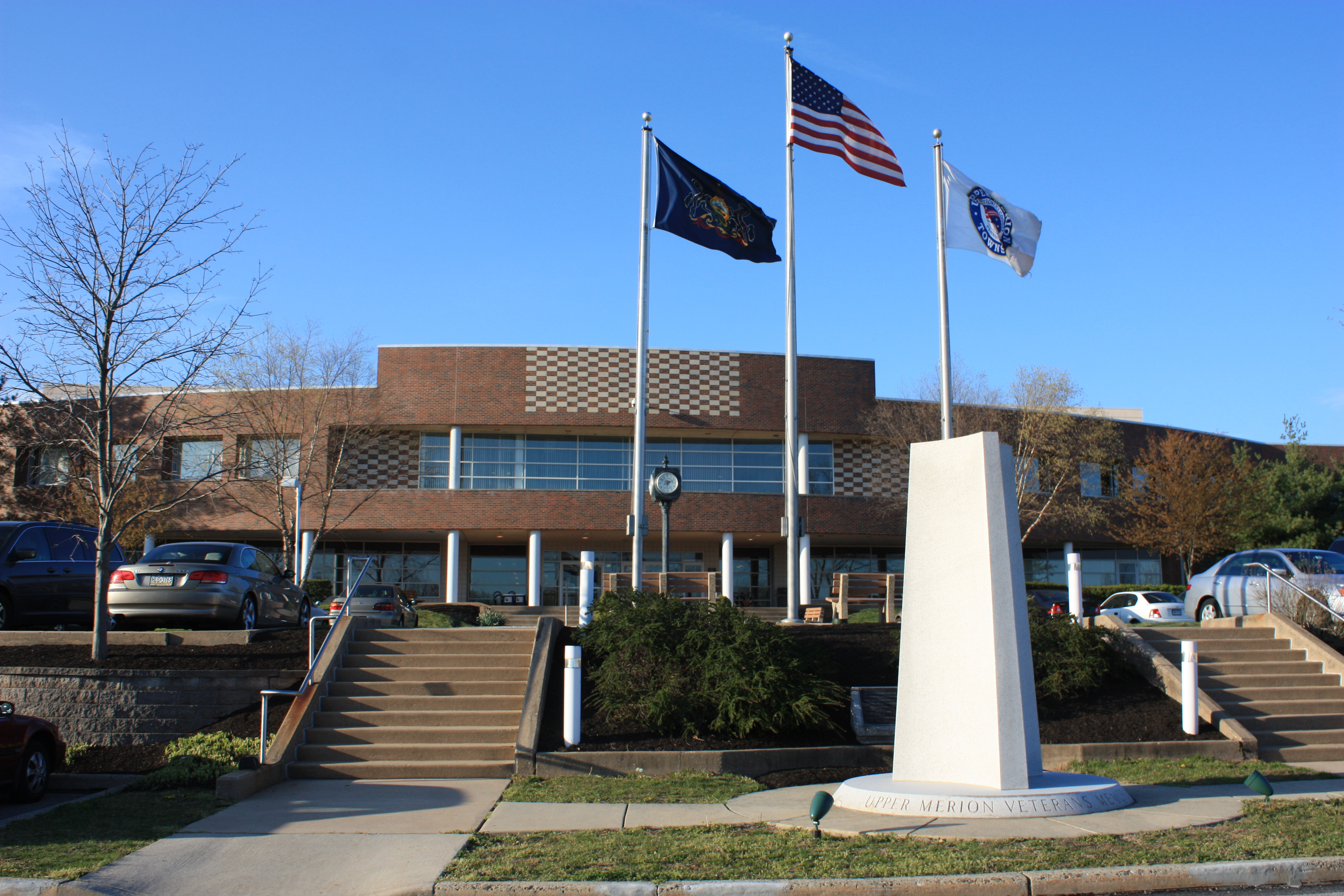
- Upper Merion Township municipal building and public library

- Flag Seal

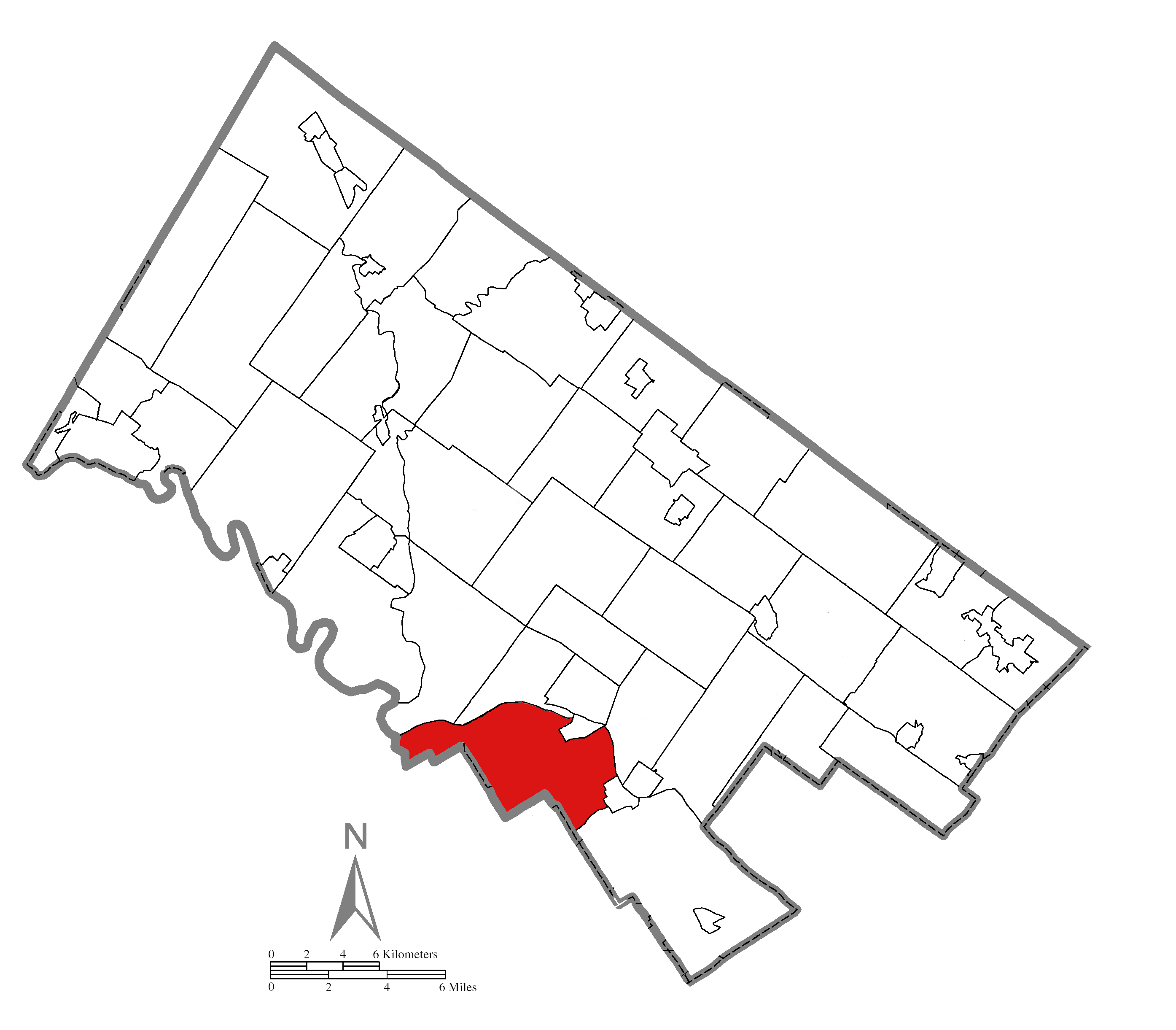

- Location of Upper Merion Township in Pennsylvania Upper Merion Township (the United States)
- Coordinates: 40°05′00″N 75°20′59″W
- Country: United States of America
- State: Pennsylvania
- County: Montgomery
- Incorporated: 1713

Area
  - Total: 17.27 sq mi (44.74 km^{2})
  - Land: 16.95 sq mi (43.91 km^{2})
  - Water: 0.32 sq mi (0.82 km^{2})
- Elevation: 171 ft (52 m)

Population (2020)
  - Total: 33,613
  - Estimate (2016): 28,640
  - Density: 1,689.1/sq mi (652.17/km^{2})
- Time zone: UTC-5 (EST)
  - Summer (DST): UTC-4 (EDT)
- Area codes: 610 and 484
- FIPS code: 42-091-79136
- Website: www.umtownship.org

Upper Merion Township is a township in Montgomery County, Pennsylvania, United States. The population was 33,613 at the 2020 U.S. Census. Located 16 miles (26 km) from Philadelphia, it consists of the villages of Gulph Mills, King of Prussia, Swedeland, Swedesburg, and portions of Radnor, and Wayne.

The westernmost part of the township comprises the largest part of the 1,300-acre (5 km^{2}) Valley Forge National Historical Park. The township is the home of the King of Prussia Mall, the fourth-largest shopping mall in the United States in terms of gross leasable area. King of Prussia also contains a major office park hosting firms such as Lockheed Martin and GlaxoSmithKline.

The name Merion originates with the county of Merioneth in north Wales. Merioneth is an English-language translation of the Welsh Meirionnydd, itself named after Meirchion (or Meirion), grandson of Cunedda Wledig (b. ca. 380 A.D.), King of North Wales.

== History ==
The township's incorporation dates to 1713 when the King of Prussia Inn, the Bird-In-Hand Inn in Gulph Mills, and later the Swedes Ford Inn were required to pay 6 shillings to the Pennsylvania legislature for licenses. The King of Prussia Inn, built in 1719, captures the historical flavor of the township. It was named in honor of Frederick the Great, but became known during the Revolutionary War as a center of food and drink. An alternate story says the Inn, first called Berry's Tavern, got its name to lure in Prussian mercenaries who spent freely.

Upper Merion Township is a township of the second class under Pennsylvania state statutes. A five-member Board of Supervisors, elected at large for staggered six-year terms, governs it. The Board passes legislation and sets overall policy for the Township. A professional township manager runs the day-to-day operations overseeing the activities of 250 full and part-time employees.

The King of Prussia Inn, Poplar Lane, the Washington Memorial Chapel, Hanging Rock and Gulph Mills Bridge are listed on the National Register of Historic Places.

== Geography ==
According to the U.S. Census Bureau, the township has a total area of 17.2 square miles (44.7 km^{2}), of which 16.9 square miles (43.7 km^{2}) is land and 0.4 square mile (1.0 km^{2}) (2.20%) is water. Upper Merion has a hot-summer humid continental climate (Dfa) and the hardiness zone is 7a. It is drained by the Schuylkill River which forms its natural northern and eastern boundary.

Climate data for King of Prussia, Pennsylvania
Month	Jan	Feb	Mar	Apr	May	Jun	Jul	Aug	Sep	Oct	Nov	Dec	Year
Record high °F (°C)	76 (24)	75 (24)	83 (28)	98 (37)	98 (37)	100 (38)	108 (42)	106 (41)	102 (39)	90 (32)	85 (29)	76 (24)	108 (42)
Mean daily maximum °F (°C)	40 (4)	44 (7)	53 (12)	64 (18)	74 (23)	83 (28)	87 (31)	86 (30)	78 (26)	67 (19)	57 (14)	45 (7)	65 (18)
Mean daily minimum °F (°C)	22 (−6)	24 (−4)	31 (−1)	41 (5)	51 (11)	61 (16)	66 (19)	64 (18)	56 (13)	44 (7)	35 (2)	27 (−3)	44 (6)
Record low °F (°C)	−12 (−24)	−5 (−21)	8 (−13)	15 (−9)	29 (−2)	28 (−2)	48 (9)	40 (4)	35 (2)	26 (−3)	14 (−10)	−10 (−23)	−12 (−24)
Average precipitation inches (mm)	3.40 (86)	3.17 (81)	4.00 (102)	4.03 (102)	4.21 (107)	3.98 (101)	4.76 (121)	4.37 (111)	4.87 (124)	3.73 (95)	3.80 (97)	4.17 (106)	48.49 (1,233)
Source: The Weather Channel

== Notable sights ==
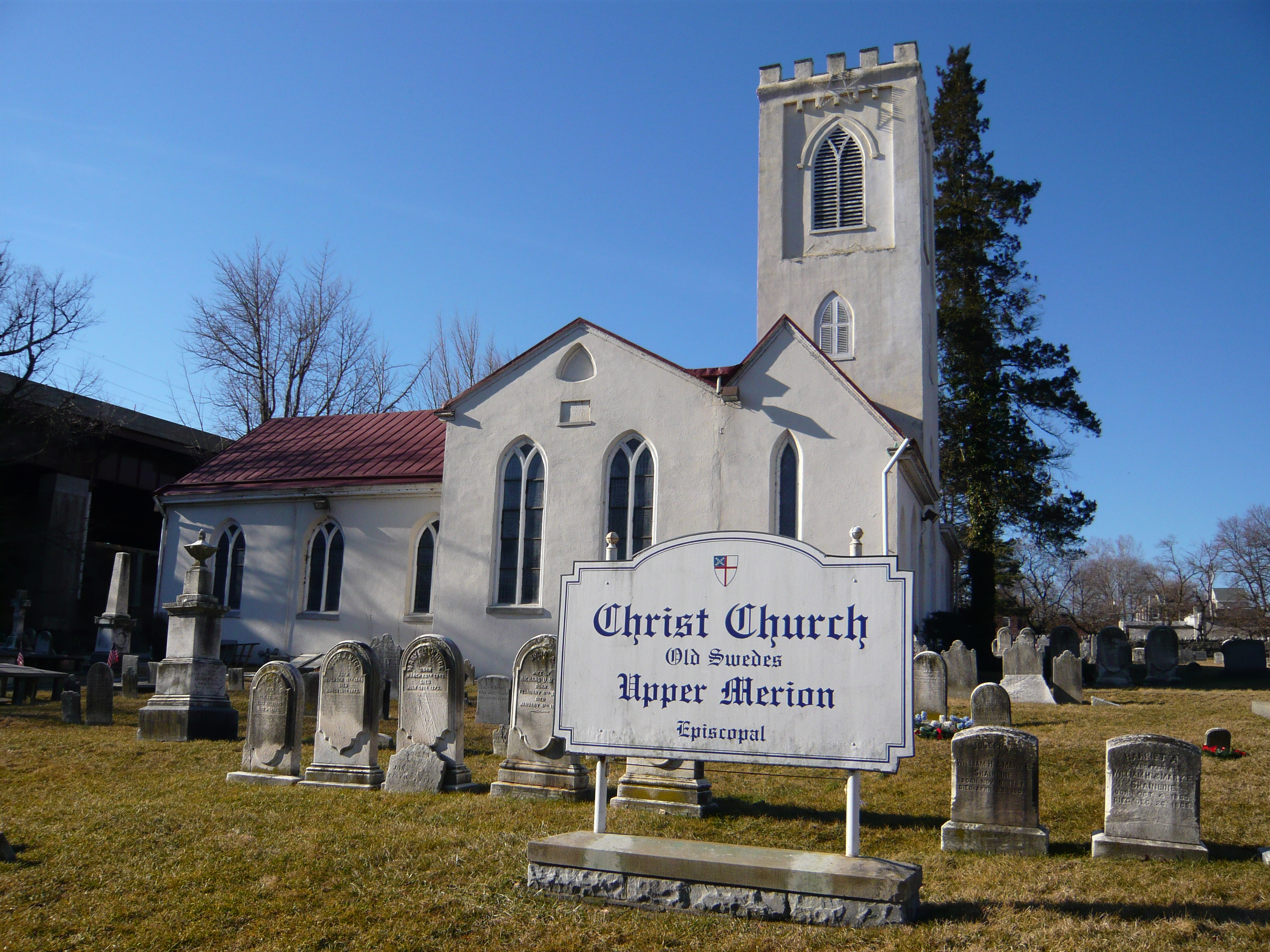
Old Swedes Church (Christ Church) Upper Merion in Swedesburg

Upper Merion Township is home to Valley Forge National Historical Park, which consists of the site where General George Washington and the Continental Army made their encampment at Valley Forge during the winter of 1777–78 in the American Revolutionary War. The King of Prussia Mall, which is the third largest mall in the United States in terms of leasable space with over 450 stores, is located in Upper Merion Township. Other points of interest in Upper Merion Township include the Valley Forge Casino Resort, the King of Prussia Town Center and the King of Prussia Volunteer Fire Company 9/11 Memorial.

Old Swedes Church (Christ Church) was dedicated June 25, 1760, in Swedesburg, replacing a simple log cabin dating to 1735. The original church had served as both a church and school until Christ Church was built. The stained glass windows tell the story of the history of the Swedish colony of New Sweden.

After crossing the Schuylkill River at Swedesford on December 13, 1777, General George Washington and his troops visited Old Swedes Church and encamped there before going on to Valley Forge.

== Demographics ==
Historical population
Census	Pop.	Note	%±
1930	5,889		—
1940	6,143		4.3%
1950	6,404		4.2%
1960	17,096		167.0%
1970	23,743		38.9%
1980	26,138		10.1%
1990	25,722		−1.6%
2000	26,863		4.4%
2010	28,395		5.7%
2020	33,613		18.4%

As of the 2020 census, the township was 69.1% White, 6.5% Black or African American, 0.0% Native American, 19.6% Asian, and 3.5% were two or more races. 4.0% of the population were of Hispanic or Latino ancestry .

As of the 2000 census, there were 26,863 people, 11,575 households, and 7,141 families residing in the township. The population density was 1,593.3 inhabitants per square mile (615.2/km^{2}). There were 12,151 housing units at an average density of 720.7 per square mile (278.3/km^{2}). The racial makeup of the township was 84.75% White, 4.63% African American, 0.13% Native American, 8.45% Asian, 0.05% Pacific Islander, 0.66% from other races, and 1.32% from two or more races. Hispanic or Latino of any race were 1.79% of the population.

There were 11,575 households, out of which 23.1% had children under the age of 18 living with them, 52.3% were married couples living together, 6.8% had a female householder with no husband present, and 38.3% were non-families. 29.7% of all households were made up of individuals, and 7.7% had someone living alone who was 65 years of age or older. The average household size was 2.30 and the average family size was 2.91.

In the township, the population was spread out, with 18.7% under the age of 18, 7.5% from 18 to 24, 33.8% from 25 to 44, 24.3% from 45 to 64, and 15.7% who were 65 years of age or older. The median age was 38 years. For every 100 females, there were 97.0 males. For every 100 females age 18 and over, there were 94.9 males.

The median income for a household in the township was $65,636, and the median income for a family was $78,690. Males had a median income of $51,247 versus $38,166 for females. The per capita income for the township was $34,961. About 1.3% of families and 2.9% of the population were below the poverty line, including 1.6% of those under age 18 and 3.1% of those age 65 or over.

== Government and politics ==
Upper Merion Township is run by an elected five person Board of Supervisors, each of whom serve staggered six year terms. The current supervisors are Chairperson Tina Garzillo (D), Vice Chairperson Bill Jenaway (D), Greg Waks (D), Greg Philips (D) and Carole Kenney (D). Other than Garzillo, who was appointed in June 2018 to finish the term of Erika Spott (D), there has not been a change in the composition of the Board of Supervisors since January 2012 and each of the current Supervisors (other than Garzillo) was re-elected by a significantly greater margin than originally elected. The Chairperson and Vice Chairperson are elected every year in January by their fellow Supervisors.

The recent Chairs of the Upper Merion Township Board of Supervisors: 2022: Carole Kenney; 2021: Bill Jenaway; 2020: Bill Jenaway; 2019: Greg Waks; 2018: Greg Philips; 2017: Bill Jenaway; 2016: Bill Jenaway; 2015: Greg Philips (from January–April); Erika Spott (from May–December); 2014: Greg Waks; 2013: Greg Waks; 2012: Erika Spott; 2011: Ed McBride (R); 2010: Joe Bartlett (R); 2009: Scott Sibley (R); 2008: Scott Sibley (R)

Municipal general election results from 2001–Present:

Year	Name and Vote Total	Name and Vote Total	Name and Vote Total	Name and Vote Total
2001	Anthony "Chuck" Volpi (R) 3294	Sal Sonsino (D) 2138	N/A	N/A
2003	Barbara Frailey (R) 2880	Scott Sibley (R) 2693	Bill Wall, Jr. (D) 2243	Ronald Hartley, Jr. (D) 2184
2005	Joseph Bartlett (R) 2190	Edward McBride (R) 2015	Kenneth Forman (D) 1644	Sandy Moskowitz (D) 1357
2007	Erika Spott (D) 2747	Anthony "Chuck" Volpi (R) 2681	N/A	N/A
2009	Greg Waks (D) 2537	William Jenaway (R) 2424	Carole Kenney (D) 2334	Scott Sibley (R) 2291
2011	Carole Kenney (D) 3185	Greg Philips (D) 3048	Edward McBride (R) 2978	Scott Sibley (R) 2930
2013	Erika Spott (D) 2564	Marianne Hooper (R) 2272	N/A	N/A
2015	Greg Waks (D) 3602	William Jenaway (D) 3446	Dave Furman (R) 2330	Bruce Fegan (R) 2240
2017	Carole Kenney (D) 3485	Greg Philips (D) 3450	Mark A. Volpi (R) 2459	Joseph J. White, Jr. (R) 2376
2019	Tina Garzillo (D) 4445	Mike Napolitan (R) 2806	N/A	N/A
2021	Greg Waks (D) 4698	William Jenaway (D) 4324	Keith Kline (R) 3184	Julia Valenti (R) 3024

All township business meetings are televised by Upper Merion Government Access Television (UMGA-TV). The elected Tax Collector is Evelyn Ankers (D). The elected Board of Auditors are Rhonda Cohen (D), Steve Ciavarri (D) and Kevin Snow (D). The Supervisors hire a township manager to run the operations of the township. The township manager is Anthony Hamaday.

The township is part of the Fourth Congressional District (represented by Rep. Madeleine Dean-D), the 149th State House District (represented by Rep. Tim Briggs-D) and the 17th State Senate District (represented by Sen. Amanda Cappelletti-D).

Presidential elections results
Year	Republican	Democratic
2024	35.4% 6,830	63.1% 12,166
2020	33.9% 6,348	64.9% 12,151
2016	35.3% 5,098	60.7% 8,765
2012	41.2% 5,772	57.6% 8,065
2008	40.1% 5,694	59.1% 8,791
2004	43.1% 6,380	56.5% 8,375
2000	43.5% 5,455	54.2% 6,801
1996	40.8% 4,231	48.8% 5,062
1992	32.3% 5,099	42.6% 5,528

== Economy ==
=== Top employers ===
According to Upper Merion Township's 2024 Comprehensive Annual Financial Report, the top employers in the township are:

#	Employer	# of Employees	% of Employment
1	Lockheed Martin	2,893	5.0%
2	Children's Hospital of Philadelphia	1,307	2.3%
3	US Liability Ins. Co.	1,095	1.9%
4	GlaxoSmithKline	1,045	1.8%
5	CSL Behring LLC	786	1.4%
6	UHS of Delaware Inc.	786	1.4%
7	Vertex Inc	721	1.3%
8	Valley Forge Colonial Ltd.	711	1.2%
9	Commonwealth of PA	643	1.1%
10	FedEx Ground	613	1.1%

== Education ==
Public school students in Upper Merion Township attend schools in the Upper Merion Area School District.

- Upper Merion Area High School (grades 9-12)
- Upper Merion Area Middle School (grades 5-8)
- Bridgeport Elementary School (grades K-4)
- Caley Road Elementary School (grades K-4)
- Candlebrook Elementary School (grades K-4)
- Gulph Elementary School (grades K-4)
- Roberts Elementary School (grades K-4)

Upper Merion Township also has a private school, Mother Teresa Regional Catholic School. It formed in 2012 by the merger of Mother of Divine Providence in King of Prussia and St. Teresa of Avila in Norristown.

Armenian Sisters Academy, an Armenian school, is in Upper Merion Township, with a Radnor postal address.

The Roman Catholic Archdiocese of Philadelphia previously maintained Holy Trinity Elementary School, which had a lower school in Swedesburg and an upper school in Bridgeport. It served as the parish school for Our Lady of Mount Carmel, Saint Augustine, and Sacred Heart churches. The first two churches are in Bridgeport and previously had a joint St. Augustine-Our Lady of Mount Carmel School. Sacred Heart is a Polish church in Swedesburg. 102 children were scheduled to attend in September 2005. Instead it closed in June 2005.

=== Colleges and universities ===
The Penn State Great Valley campus was located in the King of Prussia section of Upper Merion from 1963 to 1978 before relocating to Radnor. In 1982, the campus returned to Upper Merion, staying there until 1987, when it was relocated to its current location in Great Valley.

The American College of Financial Services operates out of the King of Prussia section of the township.

== Transportation ==
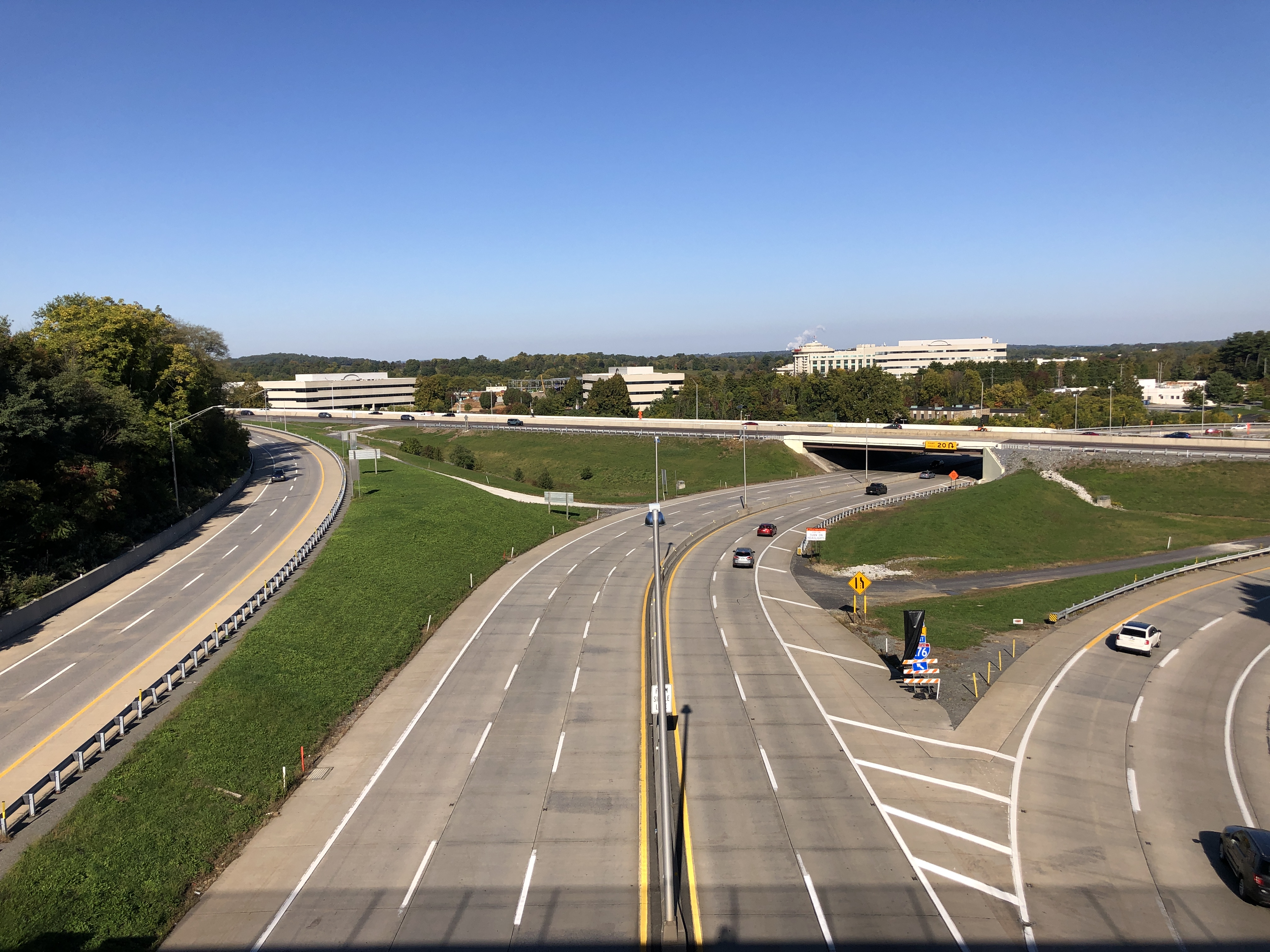
View west along the Schuylkill Expressway (I-76) at the junction with the Pennsylvania Turnpike (I-276) in Upper Merion Township

As of 2018, there were 131.70 miles (211.95 km) of public roads in Upper Merion Township, of which 5.20 miles (8.37 km) were maintained by the Pennsylvania Turnpike Commission (PTC), 41.29 miles (66.45 km) were maintained by the Pennsylvania Department of Transportation (PennDOT) and 85.21 miles (137.13 km) were maintained by the township.

Upper Merion Township is the location of several major highway junctions serving the Philadelphia metropolitan area. The most prominent of these is the interchange of the Pennsylvania Turnpike (I-276) and the Schuylkill Expressway (I-76). The east-west Pennsylvania Turnpike (I-276) traverses the central portion of the township on a southwest-northeast alignment. The Schuylkill Expressway (I-76) junctions with the turnpike at the west edge of the township and heads southeastward across the southern portion of the township, while also having another major highway junction with U.S. Route 202. U.S. Route 202 traverses the township almost parallel to the turnpike, but does veer north further east and crosses the turnpike without an interchange. Aside from its interchange with the Schuylkill, US 202 also interchanges with the eastern terminus of U.S. Route 422 near the west edge of the township. In addition to these major highways, Pennsylvania Route 23 and Pennsylvania Route 320 traverse Upper Merion Township from east to west and north to south respectively, with PA 320 having its northern terminus at PA 23 in the township. Finally, the northernmost segment of Pennsylvania Route 252 enters the far western edge of the township near its terminus at PA 23.

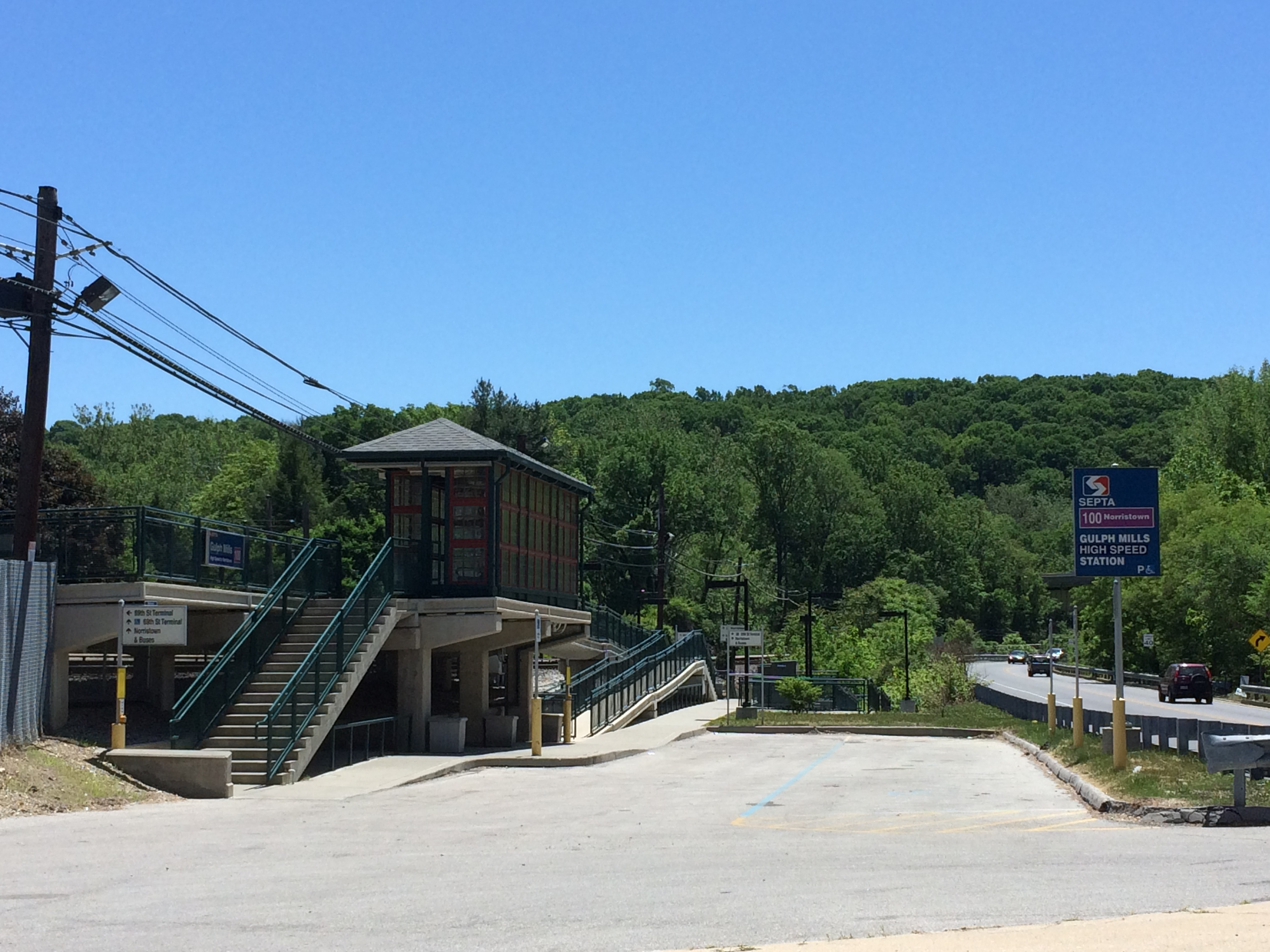
Gulph Mills station on South Gulph Road

SEPTA provides Suburban Bus service to Upper Merion Township along bus routes 92, 95, 99, 123, 124, 125, and 139. SEPTA also operates the M line between 69th Street Transit Center and Norristown Transit Center through Upper Merion Township with stops located at Gulph Mills and Hughes Park. The Greater Valley Forge Transportation Management Association operates The Rambler as a community shuttle around Upper Merion Township Monday through Saturday, serving residential areas, shopping centers, the King of Prussia mall, medical facilities, the Upper Merion Senior Center, and the Upper Merion Township Municipal Building.

== See also ==
- King of Prussia, Pennsylvania
- Wayne, Pennsylvania
- Radnor, Pennsylvania
- Lower Merion, Pennsylvania
- Valley Forge National Historic Park
