= Swedeland, Pennsylvania =

Unincorporated community in Pennsylvania, US

Swedeland, Pennsylvania Matsunk
- Census-designated place
- Location within Pennsylvania
- Coordinates: 40°05′16″N 75°19′52″W
- Country: United States
- State: Pennsylvania
- County: Montgomery
- Township: Upper Merion
- Elevation: 128 ft (39 m)

Population (2020)
  - Total: 1,495
- Time zone: UTC-5 (Eastern (EST))
  - Summer (DST): UTC-4 (EDT)
- ZIP code: 19406
- Area codes: 610 and 484
- GNIS feature ID: 1189158

Swedeland is a small unincorporated community that is located in Upper Merion Township, Montgomery County, Pennsylvania, United States, in the suburbs of Philadelphia. As of the 2020 United States census the population was 1,495.

It was founded as "Matsunk" by Swedish settlers in 1710. The name was changed to Swedeland sometime in the late 19th century.

== History ==
Situated along the Schuylkill River and the Matsunk Creek, this Swedish village was composed of roughly nineteen homes. After the conquering of the Swedish colony by the Dutch, followed by English control, in 1664, a third generation settler with the New Sweden Colony named Peter Yocum the Third (1678–1753) established Swedeland. William Penn offered the Swedish and Finnish colonists land from his grant in this Upper Merion area.

By the mid-nineteenth century, Abraham Supplee operated a factory producing Kentucky Jean, employing some twenty-five hands. The extensive works of the Swede Iron Company were also located here, consisting of two large furnaces and a railroad line leading from the iron ore mines to the Schuylkill River.

The land in the vicinity Swedeland/Matsunk was known for its fertile soil, limestone and iron ore quarries. The Alan Wood Steel Company built a massive steel Plant and Coking Facility in Swedeland in 1919; this brought forth a need for additional housing. Alan Wood Steel operated into the early 1980s.

The Swedeland Volunteer Fire Company was formed in 1920 and continues to protect the citizens of Upper Merion and nearby communities. Swedeland has continued its industrial heritage and is surrounded by pharmaceutical giant GlaxoSmithKline, chemical manufacturer Lonza, the Renaissance Business Park and The Philadelphia Newspapers Incorporated Complex.

== Education ==
The school district is the Upper Merion Area School District.

== See also ==
- New Sweden
