= West Conshohocken, Pennsylvania =

Borough in Pennsylvania, US

Borough of West Conshohocken
- Borough
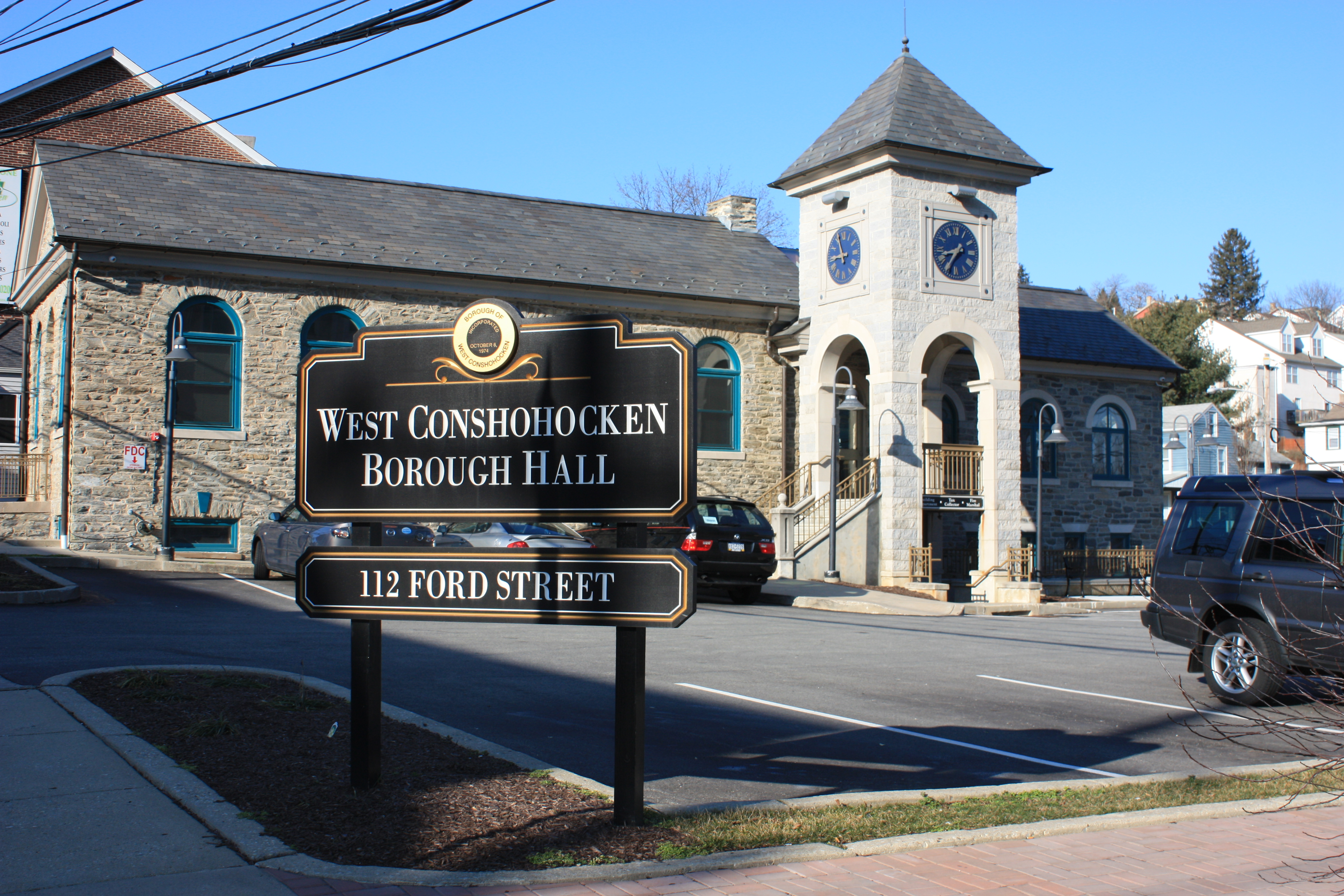
- West Conshohocken Borough Hall

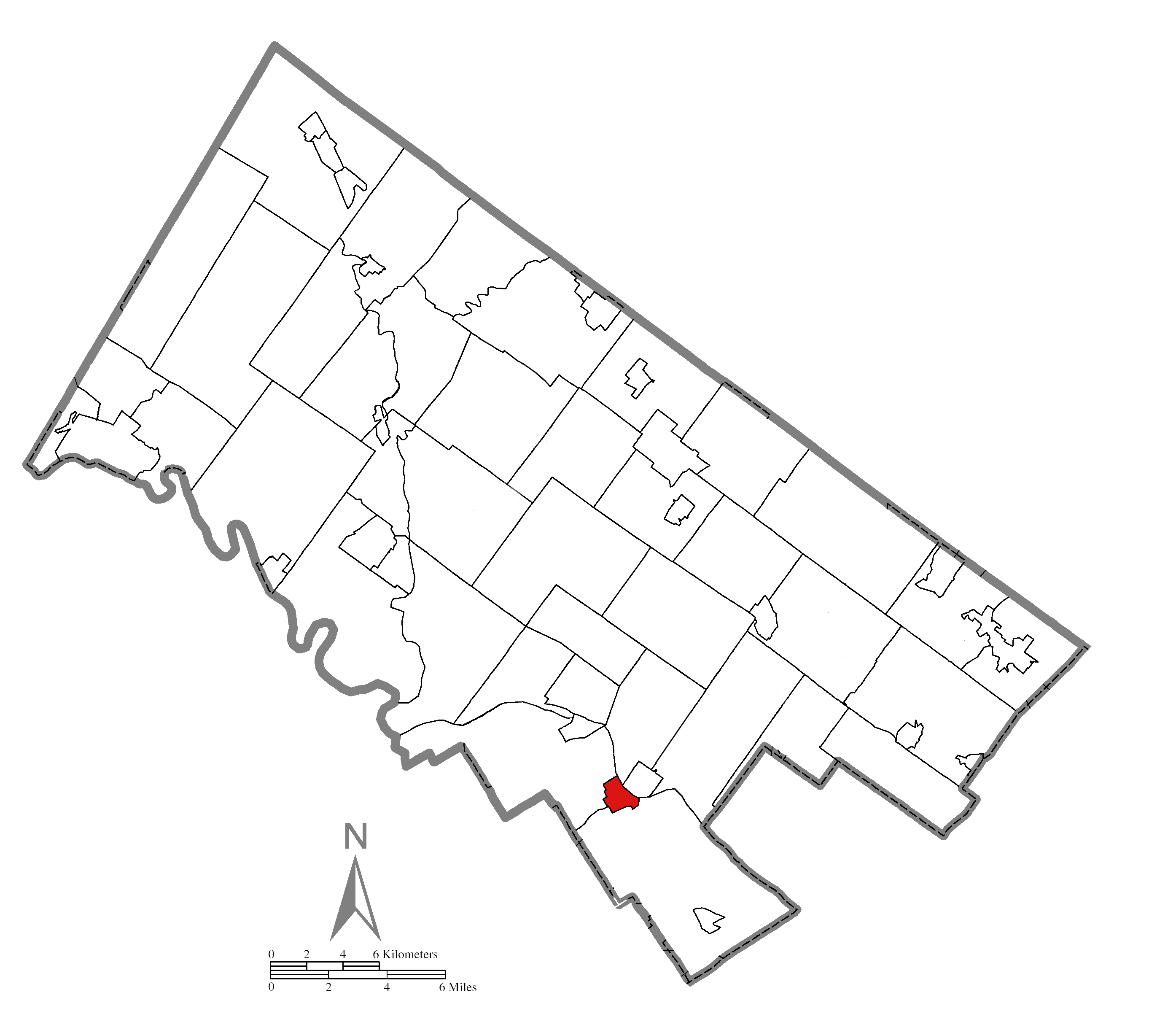
- Location of West Conshohocken in Montgomery County, Pennsylvania

- Location of West Conshohocken in Pennsylvania West Conshohocken (the United States)
- Coordinates: 40°04′10″N 75°18′57″W
- Country: United States
- State: Pennsylvania
- County: Montgomery
- Incorporated: 1874

Government
  - Type: Council-manager
  - Mayor: Danelle Fournier (D)

Area
  - Total: 0.88 sq mi (2.29 km^{2})
  - Land: 0.85 sq mi (2.19 km^{2})
  - Water: 0.039 sq mi (0.10 km^{2})
- Elevation: 144 ft (44 m)

Population (2010)
  - Total: 1,320
  - Estimate (2019): 1,432
  - Density: 1,695.7/sq mi (654.73/km^{2})
- Time zone: UTC-5 (EST)
  - Summer (DST): UTC-4 (EDT)
- ZIP Code: 19428
- Area codes: 610 and 484
- FIPS code: 42-82736
- Website: https://westconsho.com/

West Conshohocken is a borough in Montgomery County, Pennsylvania, United States. As of the 2020 census, West Conshohocken had a population of 1,493.

Its sister community is Conshohocken, located across the Schuylkill River. Montgomery County's seat, Norristown, is located approximately two miles north of, and on the opposite side of the river from, West Conshohocken.

== History ==
West Conshohocken was incorporated October 6, 1874, from land taken almost equally from Lower and Upper Merion Townships. The area's original name had been Balligomingo. As a river borough, there were a large number of mills and other industries utilizing water power. Dougherty Quarry was a prosperous business, producing stone of superior quality known as Conshohocken or Merion Blue. It was much sought after for public buildings, and was shipped by rail throughout the East Coast before supplies were exhausted in the mid-20th century.

With its proximity to highways I-76 and I-476, also known as the Blue Route, West Conshohocken and its sister Conshohocken have experienced moderate office and retail development. West Conshohocken has mid and high-rise commercial development along its waterfront, which in recent years has also spread across the river to Conshohocken's waterfront.

== Geography ==
West Conshohocken is located at 40°4′10″N 75°18′57″W (40.069509, -75.315755).

According to the U.S. Census Bureau, the borough has a total area of 0.9 square miles (2.3 km^{2}), of which 1.0 square mile (2.6 km^{2}) is land and 0.04 square miles (0.10 km^{2}) (4.49%) is water.

=== Climate ===
The climate in this area is characterized by hot, humid summers and generally mild to cool winters. According to the Köppen Climate Classification system, West Conshohocken has a humid subtropical climate, abbreviated "Cfa" on climate maps. Average monthly temperatures range from 32.1 °F in January to 76.6 °F in July. The local hardiness zone is 7a.

== Demographics ==
Historical population
Census	Pop.	Note	%±
1880	1,462		—
1890	1,666		14.0%
1900	1,958		17.5%
1910	2,202		12.5%
1920	2,331		5.9%
1930	2,579		10.6%
1940	2,464		−4.5%
1950	2,482		0.7%
1960	2,254		−9.2%
1970	2,194		−2.7%
1980	1,516		−30.9%
1990	1,294		−14.6%
2000	1,446		11.7%
2010	1,320		−8.7%
2020	1,493		13.1%

As of the 2010 census, the borough was 90.1% White, 3.6% Black or African American, 0.5% Native American, 3.3% Asian, and 1.7% were two or more races. 3.6% of the population were of Hispanic or Latino ancestry

== Politics and government ==
Presidential elections results
Year	Republican	Democratic
2020	33.8% 335	64.8% 642
2016	36.8% 304	57.1% 472
2012	43.2% 325	55.2% 415
2008	41.9% 340	57.8% 469
2004	42.8% 312	56.7% 413
2000	37.5% 220	60.2% 353

West Conshohocken has a city manager form of government with a mayor and a seven-member borough council. The borough manager is Dr. Doug Borgerson, and the mayor is Dr. Danelle Fournier.

The borough is part of the Fourth Congressional District (represented by Rep. Madeleine Dean), the 149th State House District (represented by Rep. Tim Briggs) and the 17th State Senate District (represented by Sen. Amanda Cappelletti).

Public water is provided by Aqua of PA. Sewer facilities were sold in June 2017 to the Borough of Conshohocken for around $9,500,500.00 (9.5 million) West Conshohocken sewers are now owned and managed by the Conshohocken Authority, and all payments go to Conshohocken. Residential trash pickup is still provided by West Conshohocken. A full-time police force serves the community, but fire protection is provided by a volunteer company, the George Clay Steam Fire Engine and Hose Company Number 1, Station 39. SEPTA bus lines provide access to the Norristown Transportation Center, and bus and rail lines connect the borough to other portions of Montgomery County and Philadelphia.

== Transportation ==
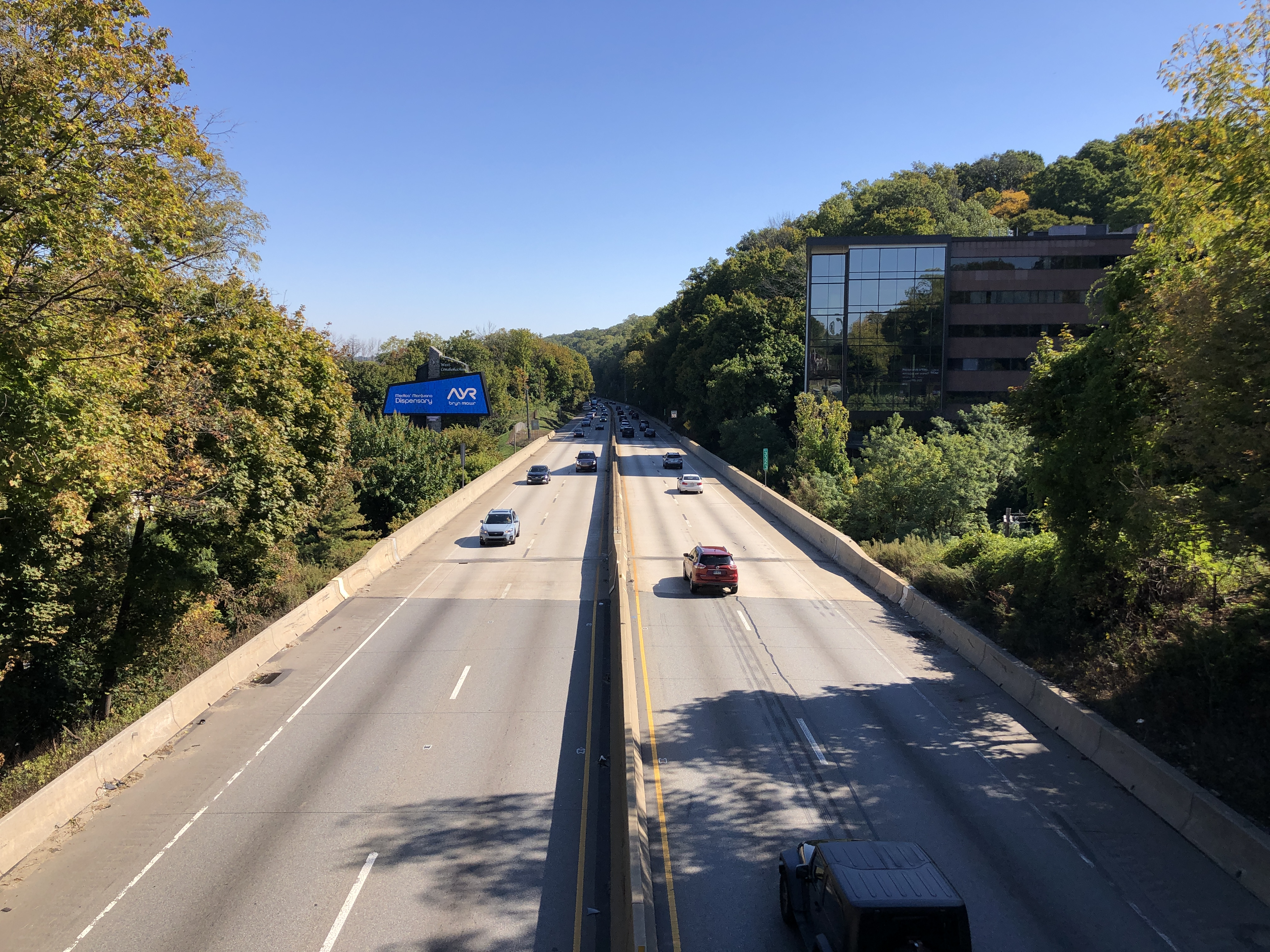
Interstate 76 eastbound in West Conshohocken

As of 2012, there were 11.29 miles (18.17 km) of public roads in West Conshohocken, of which 4.76 miles (7.66 km) were maintained by the Pennsylvania Department of Transportation (PennDOT) and 6.53 miles (10.51 km) were maintained by the borough.

West Conshohocken is the location of one of the major highway junctions of the Philadelphia metropolitan area, including the interchange of the Schuylkill Expressway (Interstate 76) and the "Blue Route" (Interstate 476). PA Route 23 also traverses the borough, providing local access.

SEPTA provides Suburban Bus service to West Conshohocken along Route 95, which runs between Gulph Mills and Willow Grove. The Conshohocken station serving SEPTA Regional Rail's Manayunk/Norristown Line is located across the Schuylkill River in Conshohocken.

== Education ==
West Conshohocken pupils are assigned to schools in the Upper Merion Area School District. Residents have access to the Conshohocken Free Library.

== Healthcare ==
The area is served by two hospitals, Einstein Medical Center Montgomery and Suburban Community Hospital.

== Companies and organizations ==
- ASTM International
- Collectables Records and Alpha Video
- Connelly Foundation
- Cheswold Lane Asset Management
