= Radnor station =

Radnor station may refer to:

- Radnor station (SEPTA Regional Rail)
- Radnor station (NHSL)
