= Villanova South station =

SEPTA Metro station in Radnor Township, Pennsylvania

Villanova South
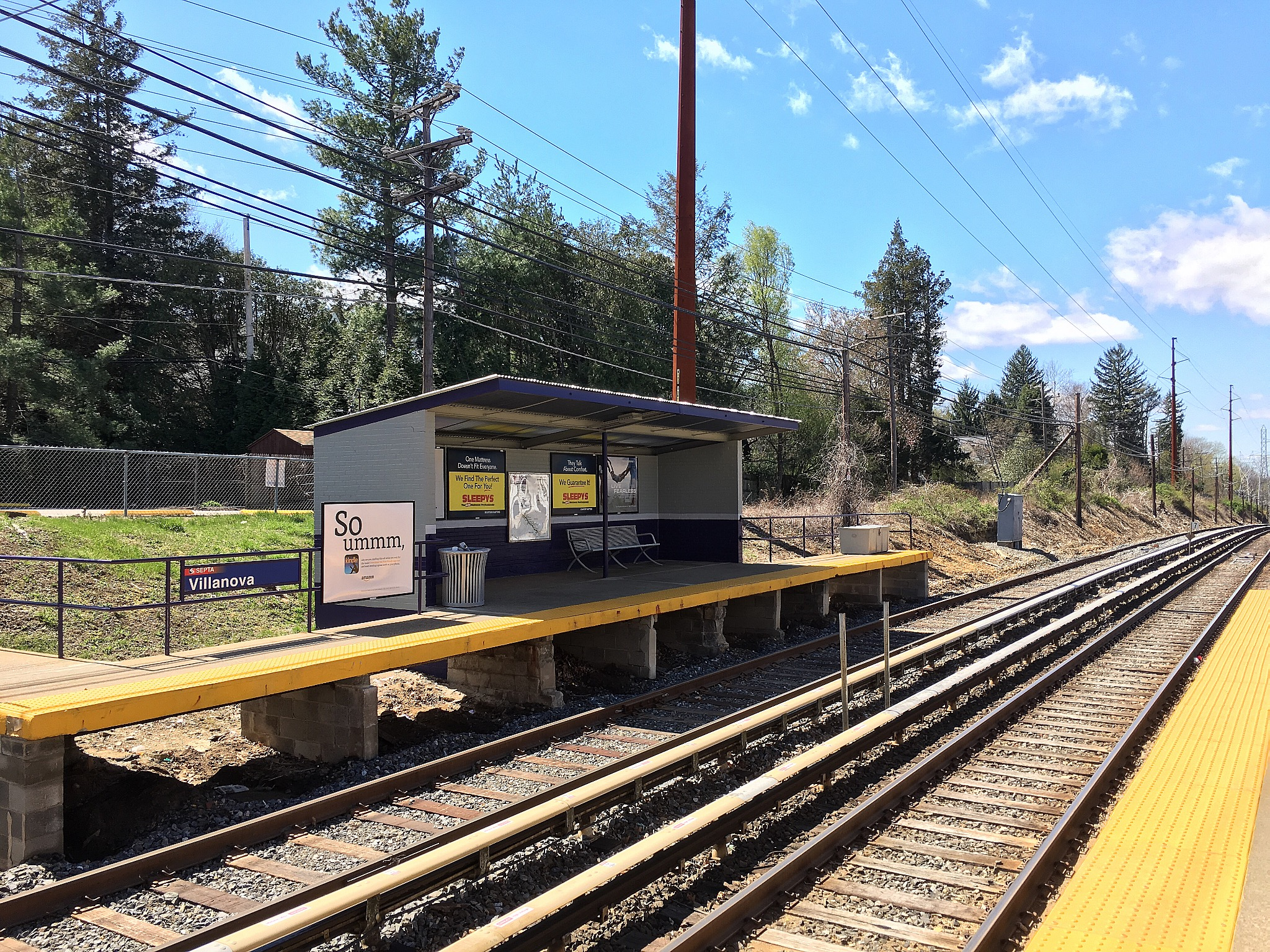

General information
- Location: Aldwyn Lane & Lancaster Avenue; Radnor Township, Pennsylvania
- Coordinates: 40.0340°N 75.3441°W
- Owner: SEPTA
- Platforms: 2 side platforms
- Tracks: 2
- Connections: SEPTA Suburban Bus: 105

Construction
- Parking: 43 spaces
- Cycle facilities: One rack
- Accessible: No

History
- Opened: 1907
- Electrified: Third rail

Services
Preceding station	SEPTA Metro	Following station
Radnor South toward Norristown T.C.	M (SEPTA Metro)	Stadium toward 69th Street T.C.
Former services
Preceding station	Lehigh Valley Transit Company	Following station
Radnor South toward Allentown	Liberty Bell High Speed Line Until 1951	Stadium–Ithan Avenue toward 69th Street
Preceding station	Philadelphia and Western Railroad	Following station
Radnor South toward Strafford	Strafford Branch Until 1956	Stadium–Ithan Avenue toward 69th Street
Location

Villanova South station (formerly known as Villanova station) is a SEPTA Metro rapid transit station near the campus of Villanova University in Radnor Township, Pennsylvania. It serves the Norristown High Speed Line (Route 100). All trains stop at Villanova. The station lies 7 track miles (11 km) from 69th Street Transit Center. The station has off-street parking available.

Villanova station lies east of the former Strafford Spur, which was closed by the Philadelphia and Western Railroad in 1956. The former right of way between Strafford and Radnor serves as the P&W Bicycle Trail.
