= Bridgeport station (SEPTA) =

Rapid transit station in Pennsylvania

Bridgeport
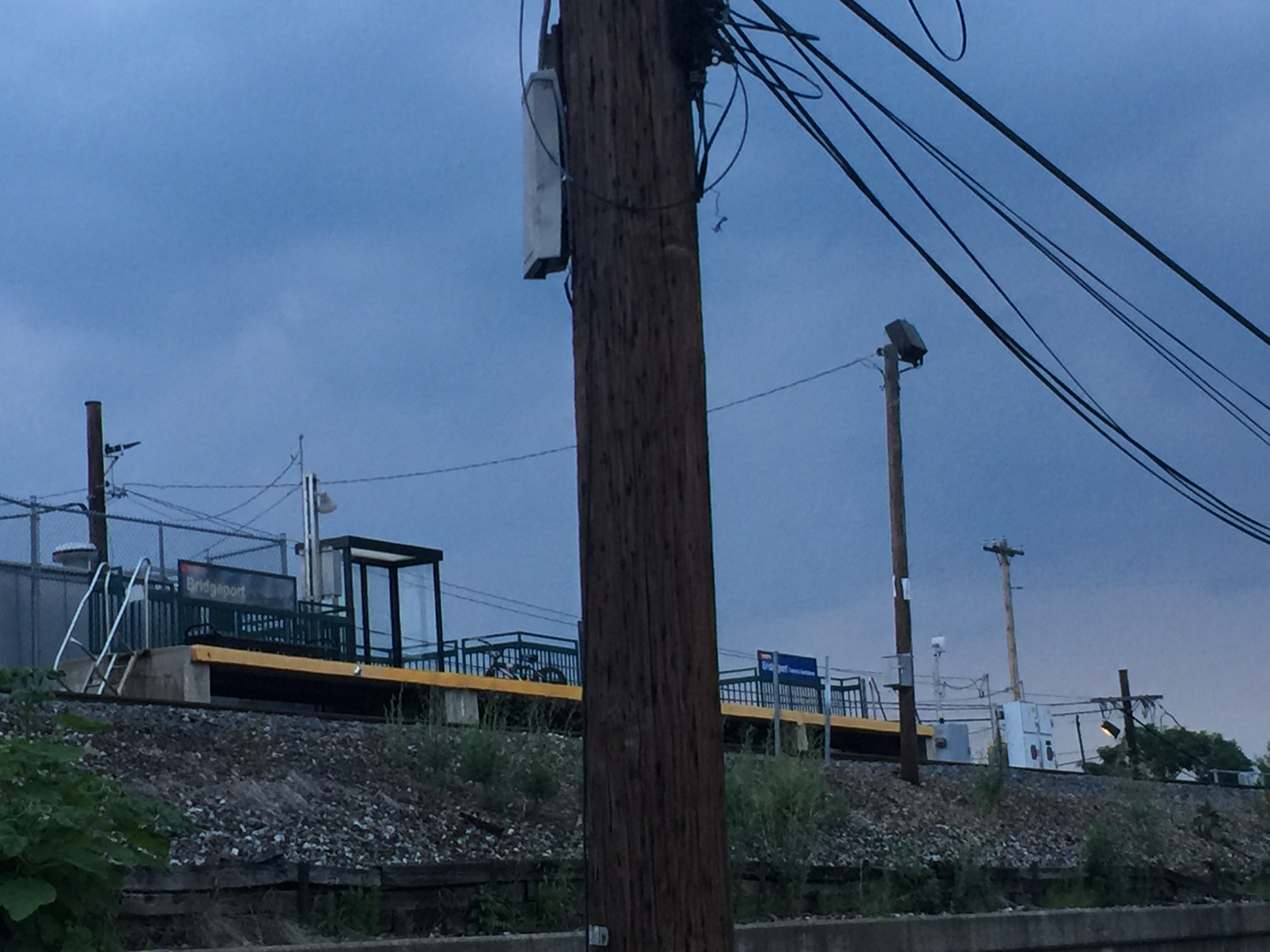
- Bridgeport station in 2017

General information
- Location: Sixth Street near DeKalb Street; Bridgeport, PA
- Coordinates: 40.1049°N 75.3482°W
- Owner: SEPTA
- Platforms: 1 side platform
- Tracks: 1

Construction
- Accessible: No

History
- Opened: 1912
- Electrified: Third rail

Services
Preceding station	SEPTA Metro	Following station
Norristown T.C. Terminus	M (SEPTA Metro)	DeKalb Street toward 69th Street T.C.
Former services
Preceding station	Lehigh Valley Transit Company	Following station
Lafayette Street toward Allentown	Liberty Bell High Speed Line Until 1951	King Manor toward 69th Street
Location

Bridgeport station is a SEPTA Metro rapid transit station in Bridgeport, Pennsylvania. It serves the M. The station is located on Sixth Street near DeKalb Street (US 202), although SEPTA's official website gives the address as being near 5th and Merion Streets. All trains stop at Bridgeport. The station lies 12.8 track miles (20.6 km) from 69th Street Terminal.

== History ==
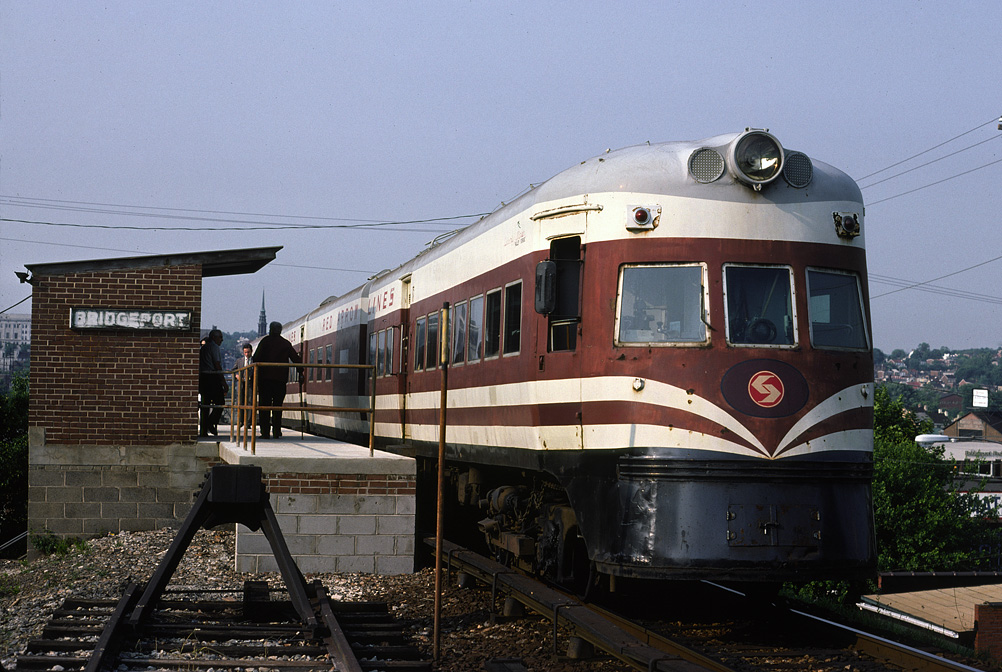
A Red Arrow Lines Liberty Liner at the station in 1976

The station opened in 1912 as part of the Philadelphia and Western Railroad branch line to Norristown. As with the rest of the line, the station was acquired by the Philadelphia Suburban Transportation Company (PSTC) in 1954, which was more popularly known as the Red Arrow Line. The PSTC was absorbed into SEPTA in 1970, which declared it to be part of the becoming the "Norristown High-Speed Line," officially known as Route 100 Trolley.
