= Bridgeport, Pennsylvania =

Borough in Pennsylvania, US

- Borough
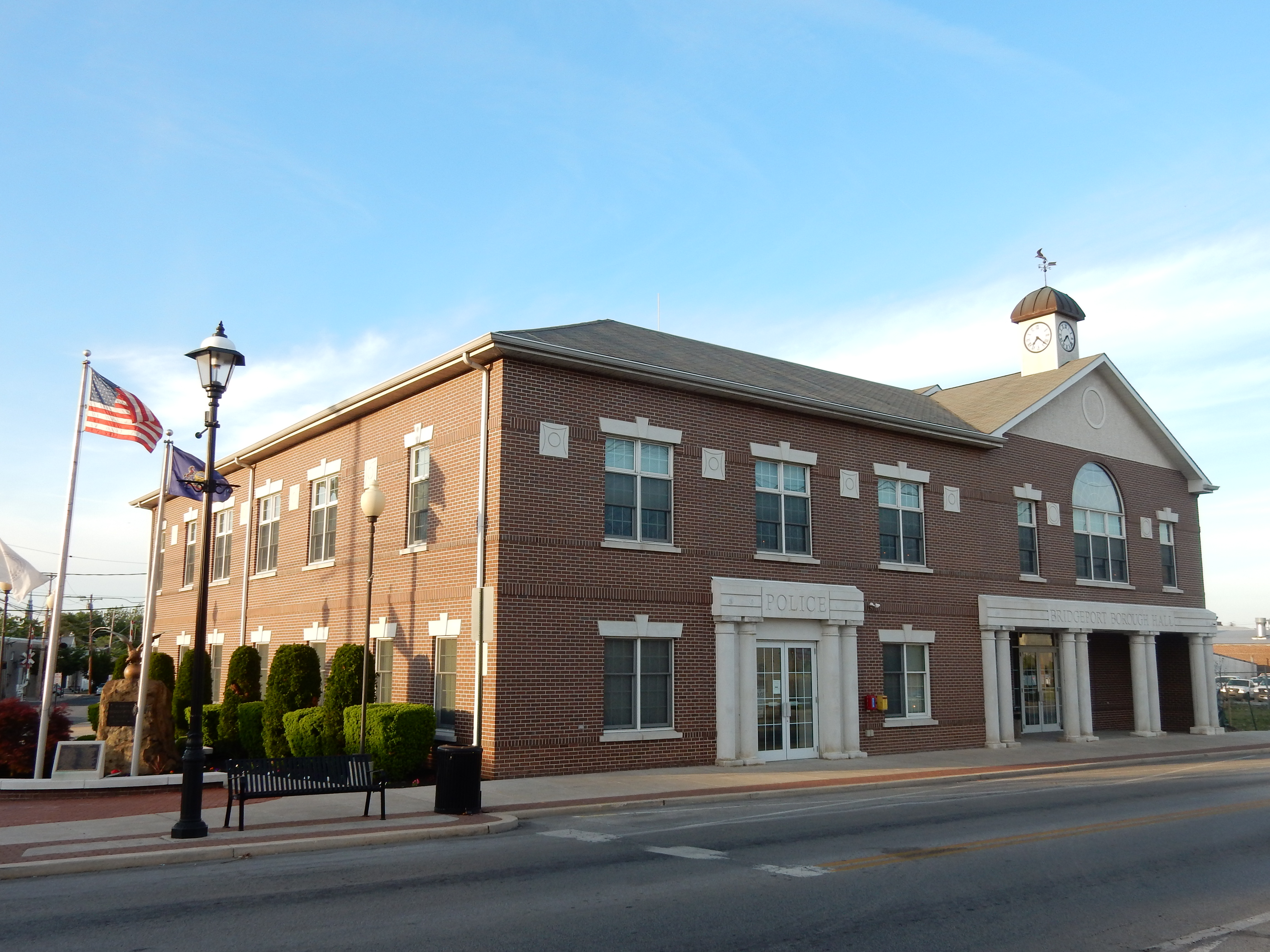
- Bridgeport Borough Hall

- Flag Seal

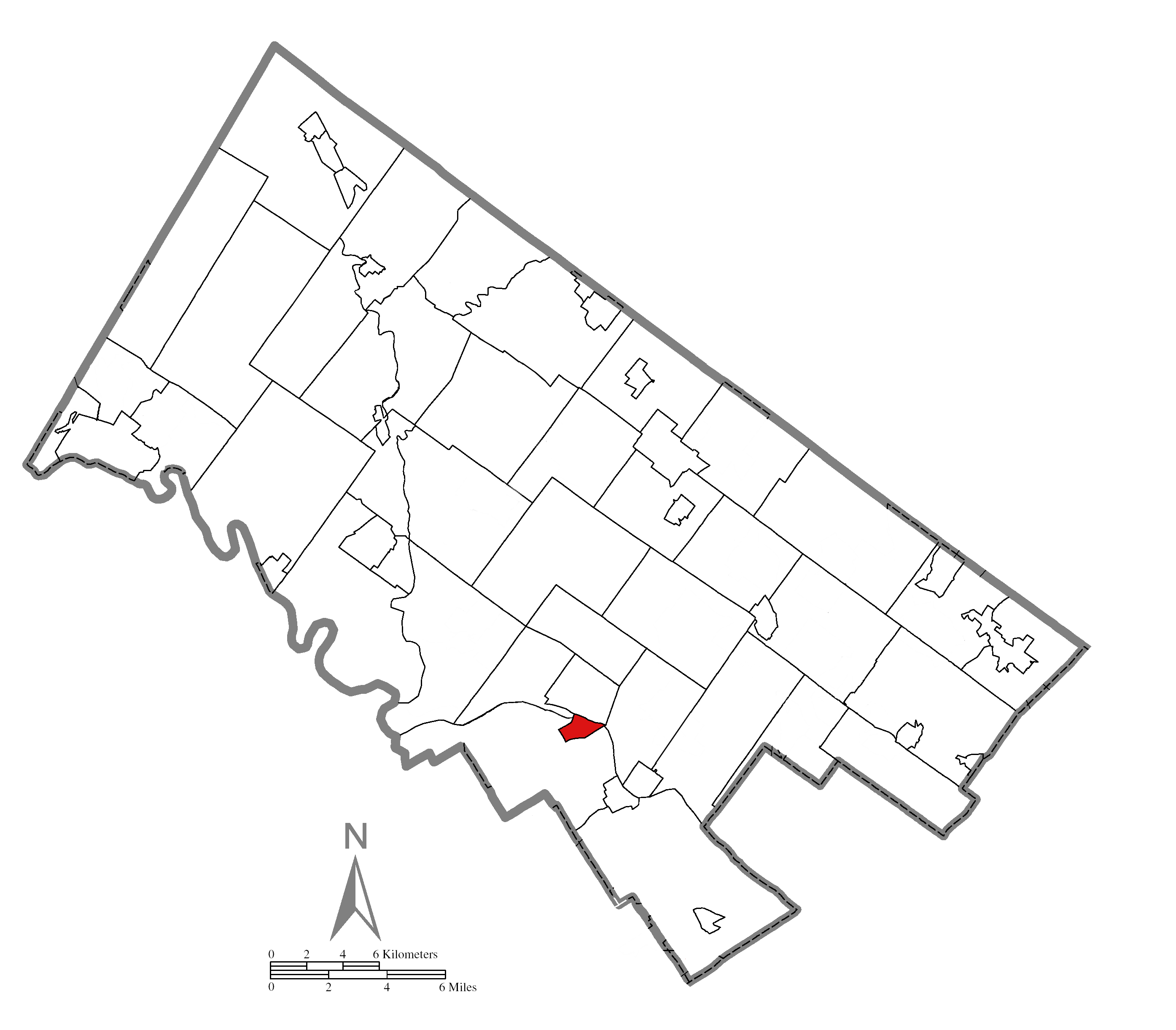
- Location of Bridgeport in Montgomery County, Pennsylvania.

- Location of Bridgeport in Pennsylvania Bridgeport (the United States)
- Coordinates: 40°06′14″N 75°20′35″W
- Country: United States
- State: Pennsylvania
- County: Montgomery

Government
  - Type: Council-Manager
  - Mayor: Tony Heyl

Area
  - Total: 0.71 sq mi (1.85 km^{2})
  - Land: 0.66 sq mi (1.71 km^{2})
  - Water: 0.054 sq mi (0.14 km^{2})
- Elevation: 108 ft (33 m)

Population (2020)
  - Total: 5,015
  - Density: 7,608.5/sq mi (2,937.67/km^{2})
- Time zone: UTC-5 (EST)
  - Summer (DST): UTC-4 (EDT)
- ZIP Code: 19405
- Area codes: 610 and 484
- FIPS code: 42-08568
- Website: https://www.bridgeportborough.org/

Bridgeport is a borough in Montgomery County, Pennsylvania, United States, 18 mi (29 km) north of Philadelphia on the Schuylkill River. Former industries included paper, flour, cotton, woolen mills, steel works, and brickyards. Bridgeport is 6 mi (9.7 km) east of Valley Forge, Pennsylvania. In 1777, during the American Revolutionary War, General George Washington and the Continental Army passed through Bridgeport on their way to their winter encampment in Valley Forge. The population was 5,015 at the 2020 census.

== Climate ==
The climate in this area is characterized by hot, humid summers and generally mild to cool winters. According to the Köppen Climate Classification system, Bridgeport has a humid subtropical climate, abbreviated "Cfa" on climate maps.

Climate data for Bridgeport, Pennsylvania
Month	Jan	Feb	Mar	Apr	May	Jun	Jul	Aug	Sep	Oct	Nov	Dec	Year
Mean daily maximum °C (°F)	4 (39)	6 (42)	11 (51)	17 (63)	23 (74)	28 (83)	31 (87)	29 (85)	26 (79)	19 (67)	13 (55)	7 (44)	18 (64)
Mean daily minimum °C (°F)	−6 (22)	−4 (25)	0 (32)	6 (42)	11 (51)	16 (61)	18 (65)	18 (64)	14 (57)	7 (45)	2 (36)	−3 (27)	7 (44)
Average precipitation mm (inches)	81 (3.2)	76 (3)	99 (3.9)	99 (3.9)	97 (3.8)	91 (3.6)	110 (4.4)	110 (4.3)	110 (4.3)	89 (3.5)	100 (4)	99 (3.9)	1,160 (45.8)
Source: Weatherbase

== Demographics ==
Historical population
Census	Pop.	Note	%±
1850	568		—
1860	1,001		76.2%
1870	1,578		57.6%
1880	1,802		14.2%
1890	2,651		47.1%
1900	3,097		16.8%
1910	3,860		24.6%
1920	4,680		21.2%
1930	5,595		19.6%
1940	5,904		5.5%
1950	5,827		−1.3%
1960	5,306		−8.9%
1970	5,630		6.1%
1980	4,843		−14.0%
1990	4,292		−11.4%
2000	4,371		1.8%
2010	4,554		4.2%
2020	5,015		10.1%

As of the 2010 census, the borough was 79.8% White, 7.9% Black or African American, 0.3% Native American, 2.8% Asian, and 3.4% were two or more races. 12.8% of the population were of Hispanic or Latino ancestry .

As of the census of 2000, there were 4,371 people, 1,983 households, and 1,070 families residing in the borough. The population density was 6,679.9 inhabitants per square mile (2,579.1/km^{2}). There were 2,088 housing units at an average density of 3,190.9 per square mile (1,232.0/km^{2}). The racial makeup of the borough was 91.44% White, 2.68% African American, 0.14% Native American, 2.43% Asian, 1.26% from other races, and 2.06% from two or more races. Hispanic or Latino of any race were 3.84% of the population.

There were 1,983 households, out of which 22.3% had children under the age of 18 living with them, 34.1% were married couples living together, 13.7% had a female householder with no husband present, and 46.0% were non-families. 38.4% of all households were made up of individuals, and 10.1% had someone living alone who was 65 years of age or older. The average household size was 2.20 and the average family size was 2.97.

In the borough the population was spread out, with 18.9% under the age of 18, 10.6% from 18 to 24, 34.3% from 25 to 44, 21.1% from 45 to 64, and 15.0% who were 65 years of age or older. The median age was 37 years. For every 100 females, there were 98.2 males. For every 100 females age 18 and over, there were 99.1 males.

The median income for a household in the borough was $36,899, and the median income for a family was $44,292. Males had a median income of $32,305 versus $27,523 for females. The per capita income for the borough was $19,420. About 5.4% of families and 7.5% of the population were below the poverty line, including 5.7% of those under age 18 and 7.8% of those age 65 or over.

== Government ==
Presidential elections results
Year	Republican	Democratic
2024	37.9% 884	61.2% 1,427
2020	35.2% 762	64.0% 1,386
2016	34.2% 616	59.9% 1,080
2012	35.4% 593	62.1% 1,041
2008	35.4% 611	63.4% 1,093
2004	37.9% 606	61.6% 985
2000	37.8% 439	58.3% 678

Bridgeport has a city manager form of government with a mayor and a seven-member borough council. The borough manager is currently Keith S. Truman, and the mayor is Tony Heyl. Beginning in 2014, council contracted from nine to seven members (2 from each ward and 1 at-large seat).

The borough is part of the Fifth Congressional District (represented by Rep. Mary Gay Scanlon), the 149th State House District (represented by Rep. Tim Briggs) and the 17th State Senate District (represented by Sen. Amanda Cappelletti).

== Education ==
Bridgeport Borough is part of the Upper Merion Area School District.

The Roman Catholic Archdiocese of Philadelphia previously maintained Holy Trinity Elementary School, which had a lower school in Swedesburg and an upper school in Bridgeport. It served as the parish school for Our Lady of Mount Carmel, Saint Augustine, and Sacred Heart churches. The first two churches are in Bridgeport and previously had a joint St. Augustine-Our Lady of Mount Carmel School. Sacred Heart is a Polish church in Swedesburg. 102 children were scheduled to attend in September 2005. Instead it closed in June 2005.

== Infrastructure ==
=== Transportation ===
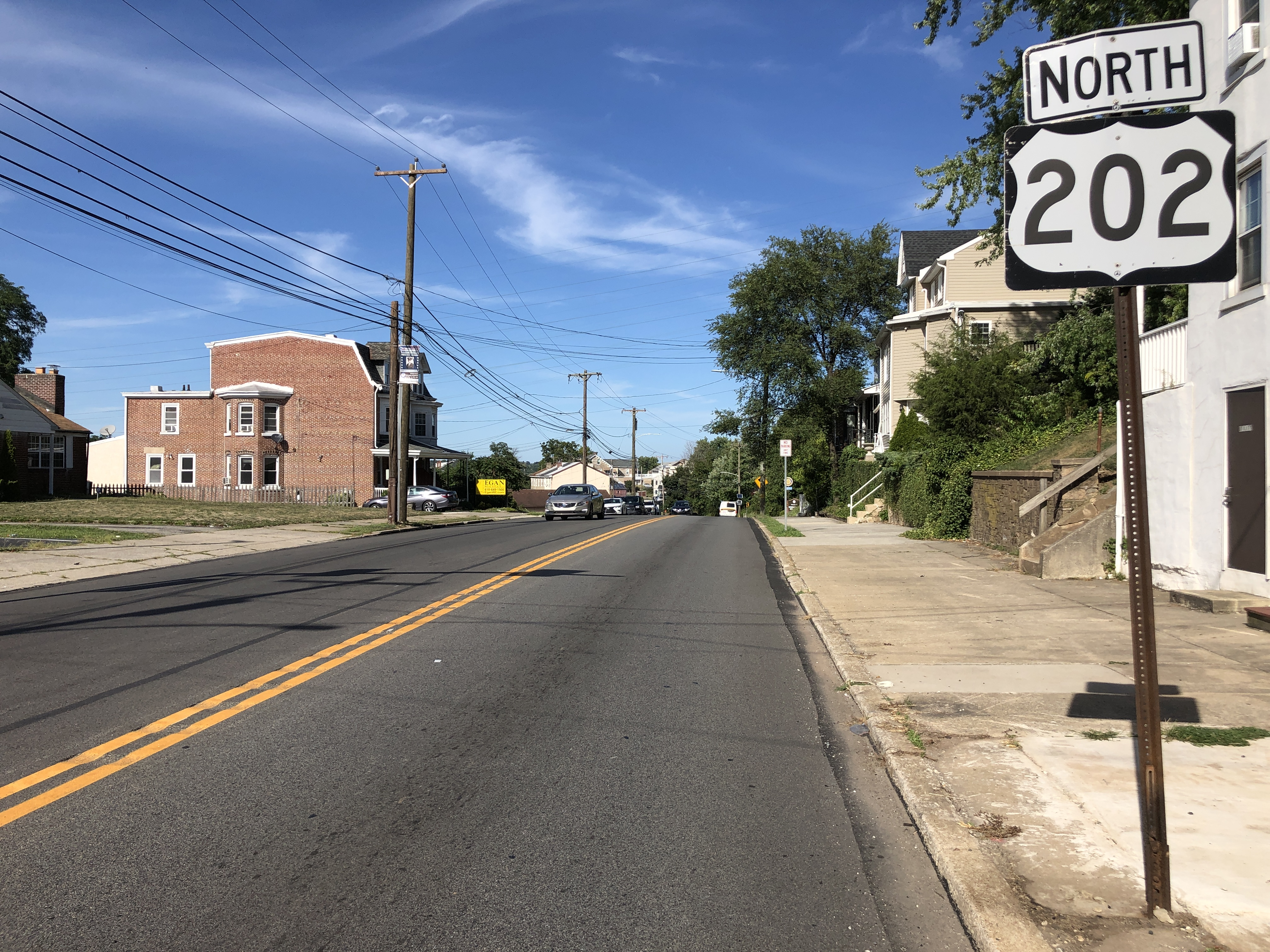
U.S. Route 202 northbound in Bridgeport

As of 2010 there were 13.05 miles (21.00 km) of public roads in Bridgeport, of which 3.78 miles (6.08 km) were maintained by Pennsylvania Department of Transportation (PennDOT) and 9.27 miles (14.92 km) were maintained by the borough.

Main roads serving Bridgeport are U.S. Route 202, which passes north-south, and Pennsylvania Route 23, which traverses east-west. US 202 follows Dekalb Street northbound and Dekalb Pike southbound, while PA 23 follows Fourth Street most of its route through the borough.

SEPTA's Norristown High Speed Line, which runs between the Norristown Transportation Center and the 69th Street Transportation Center, serves Bridgeport at the Bridgeport station and the DeKalb Street station. SEPTA operates the Route 99 bus through Bridgeport, which provides service to the Norristown Transportation Center, King of Prussia, and Phoenixville.

The Bridgeport Bridge is a Historic American Engineering Record-documented Philadelphia & Western Railway bridge spanning the Schuylkill River west of DeKalb Street. It is a single-track curving structure that was built in 1912. The structure, including trestle approaches and spans over the river, has been believed to be "perhaps the longest bridge on an American interurban railroad". The bridge currently carries SEPTA's Norristown High Speed Line.

== Notable people ==
- Brad Scioli – former American football defensive end for the Indianapolis Colts of the National Football League (NFL)
- Leonard Tose – former owner of the Philadelphia Eagles of the National Football League (NFL)
- Ariana Ramsey OLY – American rugby sevens player. She represented the United States at the 2020 and 2024 Summer Olympics, winning bronze in 2024.

== Gallery ==
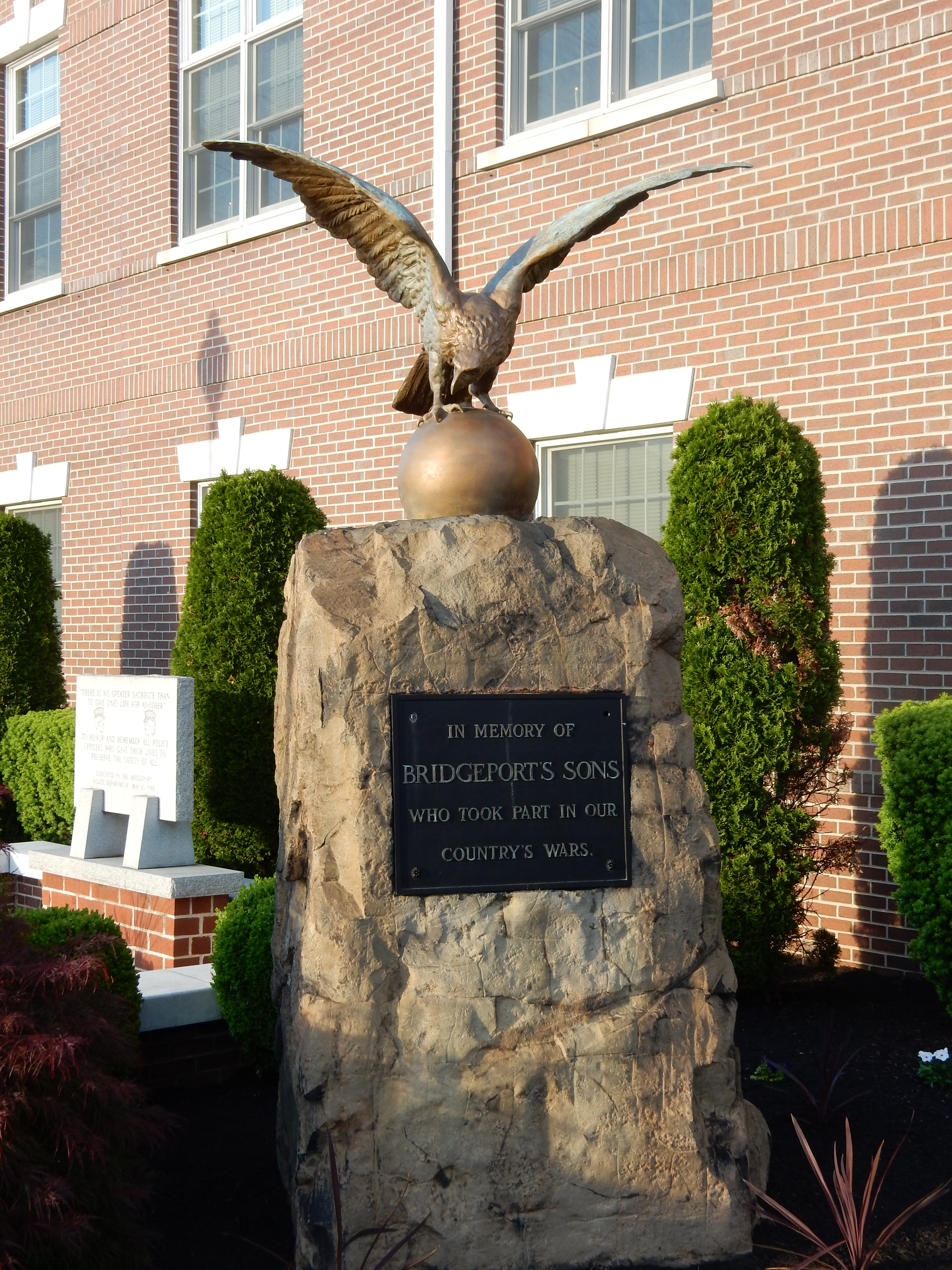
War Memorial near Borough Hall.

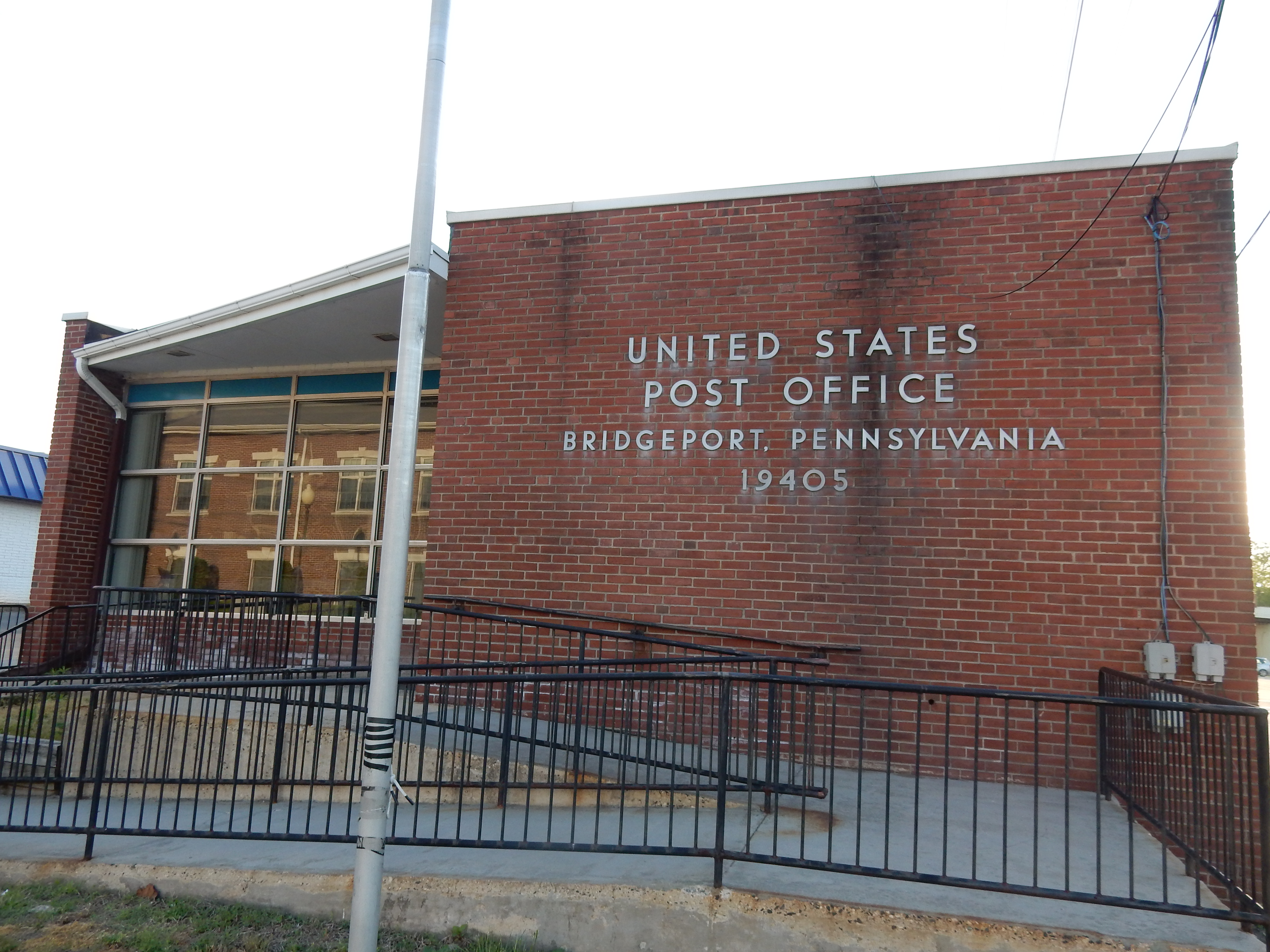
Bridgeport Post Office.

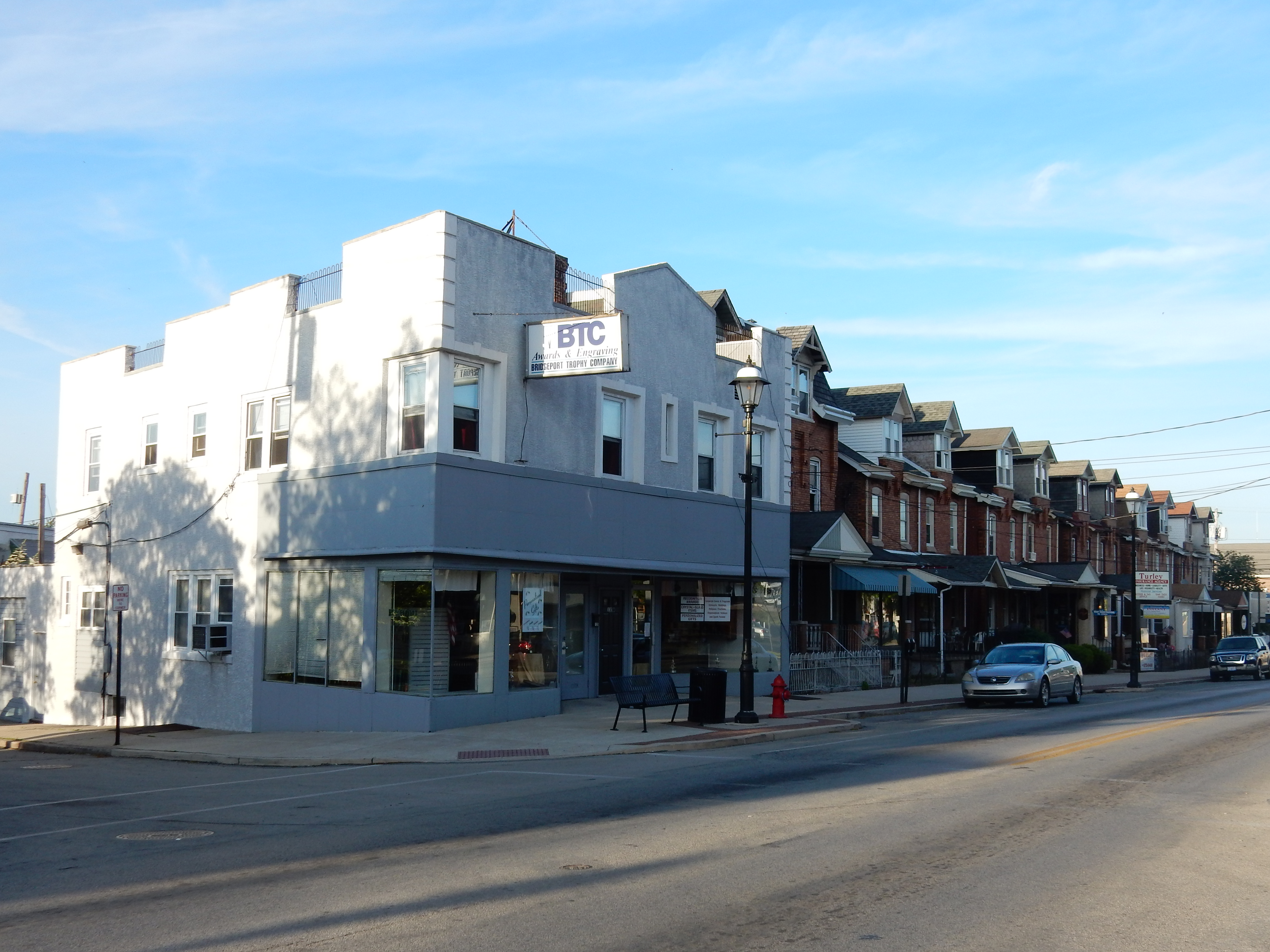
Bridgeport. West 4th Street.

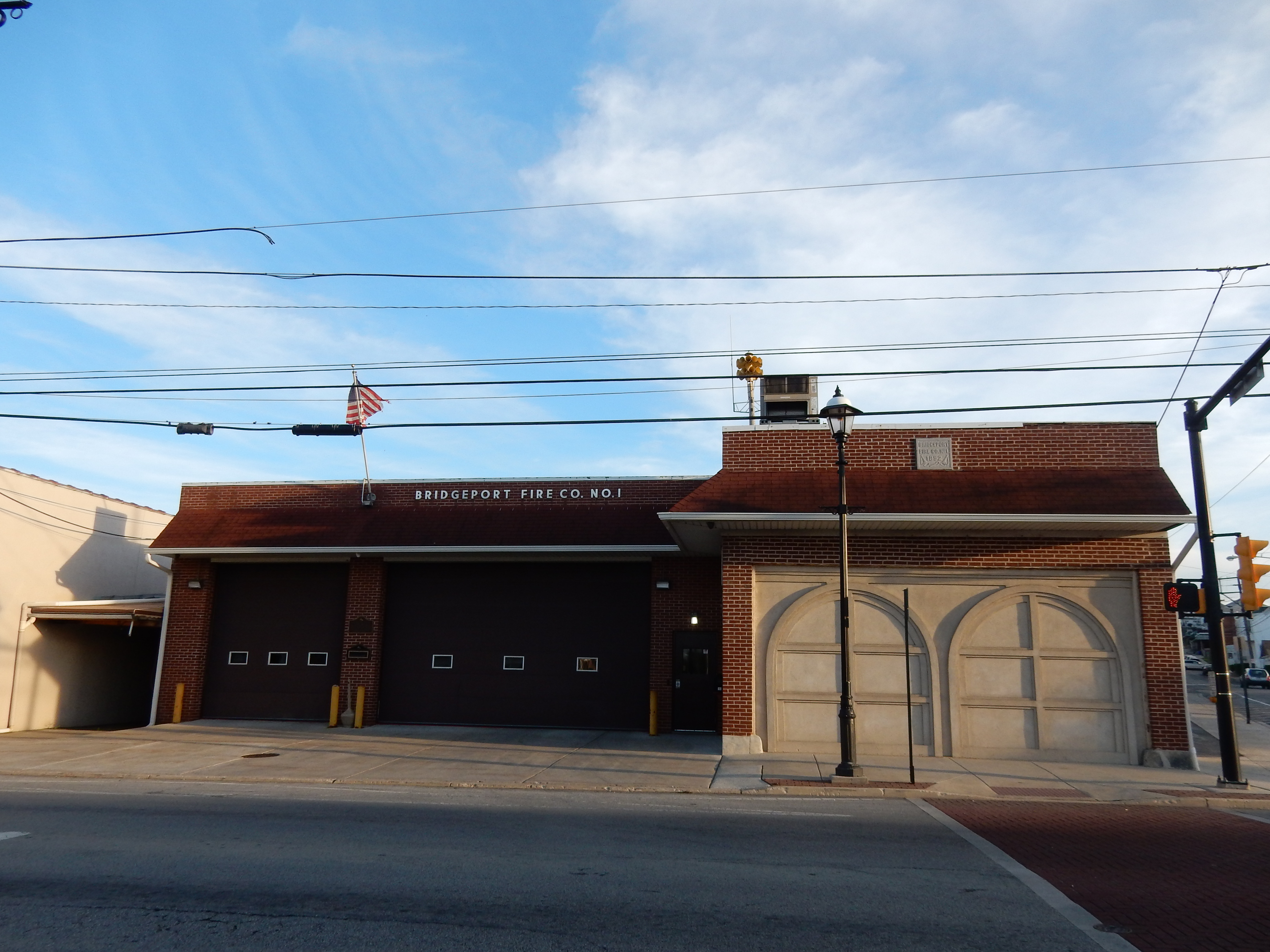
Bridgeport Fire Co No 1.

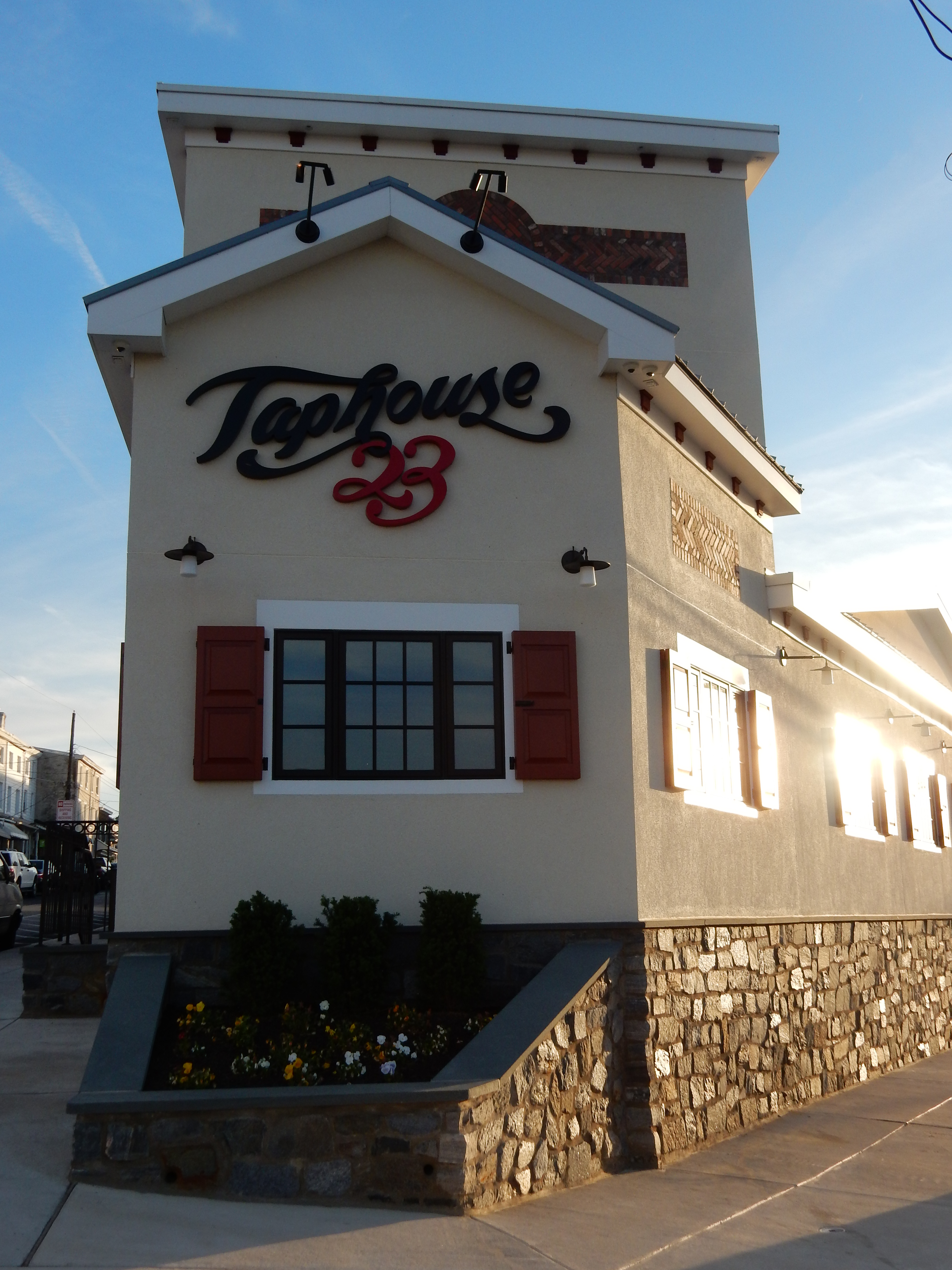
E. 4th St. Taphouse 23.
