= Ithan station =

Historical train station in Pennsylvania

Coordinates: 40.0335°N 75.3726°W

Ithan
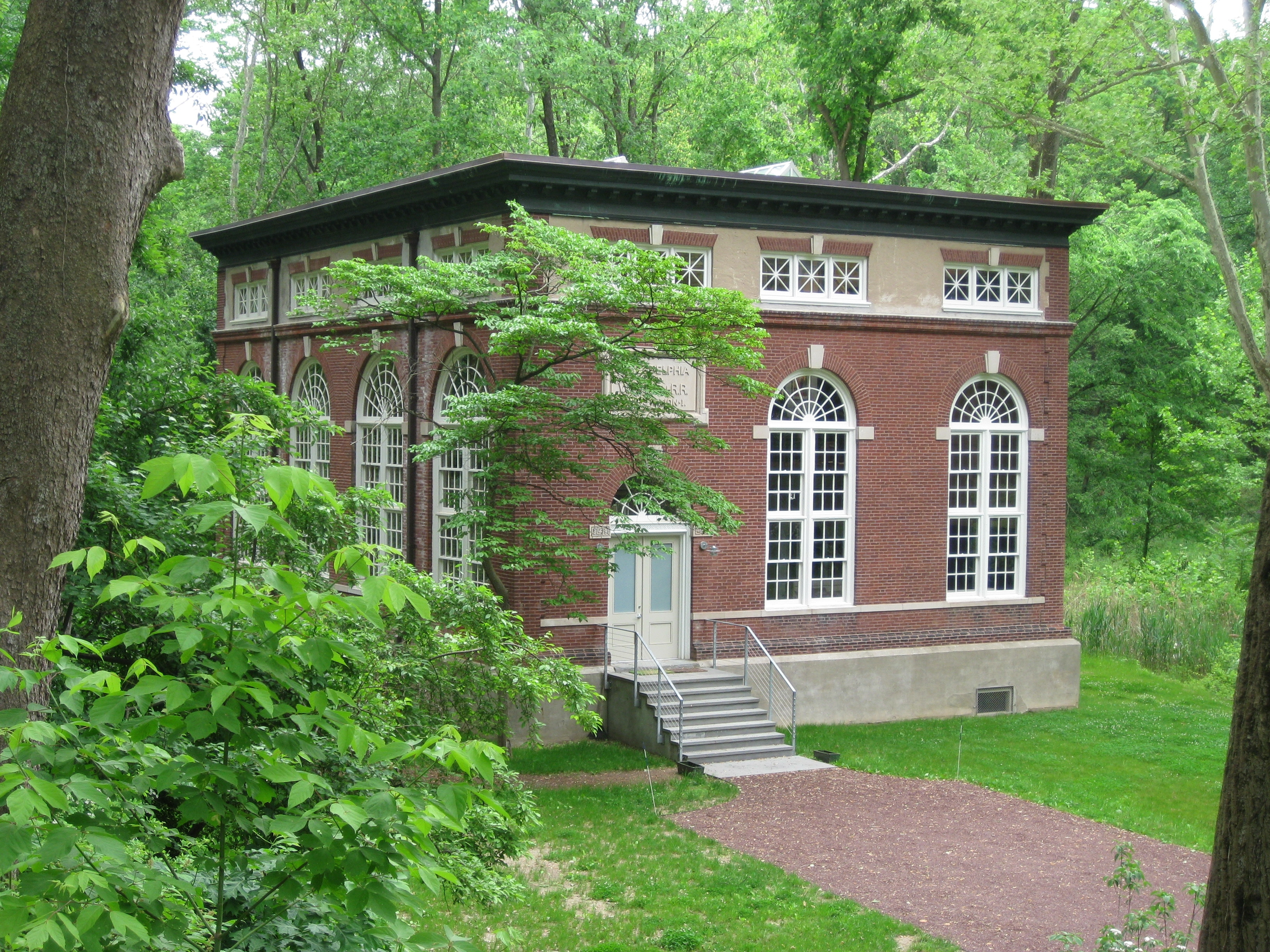
- The Ithan Substation No. 1, located on Conestoga Road in Wayne, on the Strafford line; May, 2009

General information
- System: Former Philadelphia and Western Railroad station

History
- Opened: 1907
- Closed: 1956

Services
Preceding station	Philadelphia and Western Railroad	Following station
St. Davids toward Strafford	Strafford Branch Until 1956	Radnor toward 69th Street
Location

Ithan Station was a former train station of the Philadelphia and Western Railroad outside of Philadelphia, Pennsylvania. It was constructed as a stop on the Strafford Branch of the line that is now known as the Norristown High Speed Line. The station was active along what was then considered to be the main line (1907–1956) until the Norristown branch became the main line in 1912. According to another source, the station was situated between the Wayne Junction and Radnor stations.

== History ==
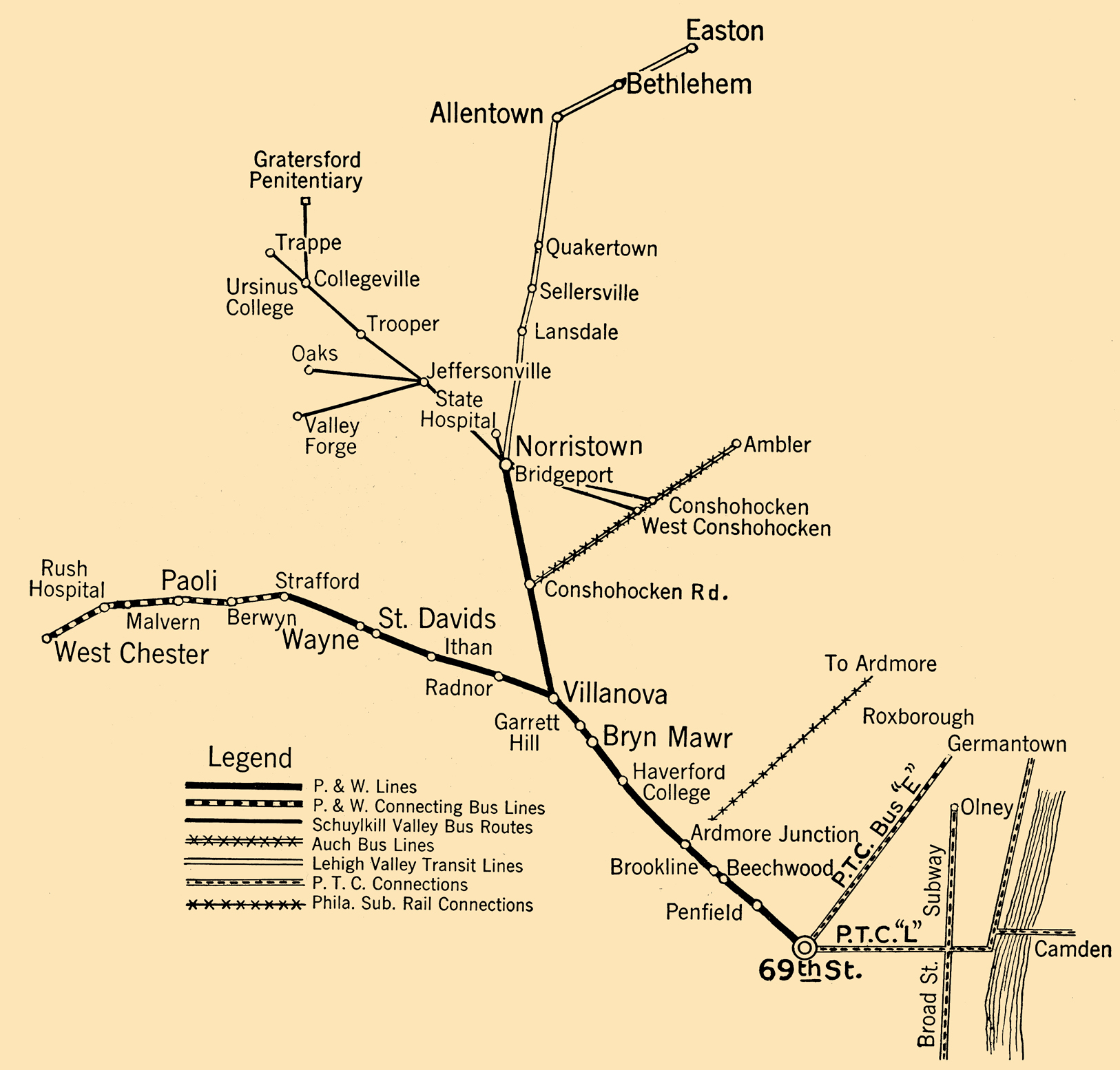
1941 Philadelphia & Western routes and connecting lines

The station was part of the Philadelphia and Western Railroad line that ran from 69th Street station to Strafford when around when the corporation formed and when the line was active in 1907. The reorganized company had a capital stock of $4,000,000, consisting of $3,400,000 of common stock and $600,000 of 5% preferred stock.

The substation was built in 1907 and operated as a power substation for the railroad until 1919. In 1920, Thomas Newhall (the president of the Philadelphia & Western Railroad) purchased the building for his personal use as a recreation and club room, including a squash court and space to house his gun collection. In May 1947, six months after his wife died, Newhall (in a depression state) committed suicide in the building by means of a self-inflicted gunshot wound.

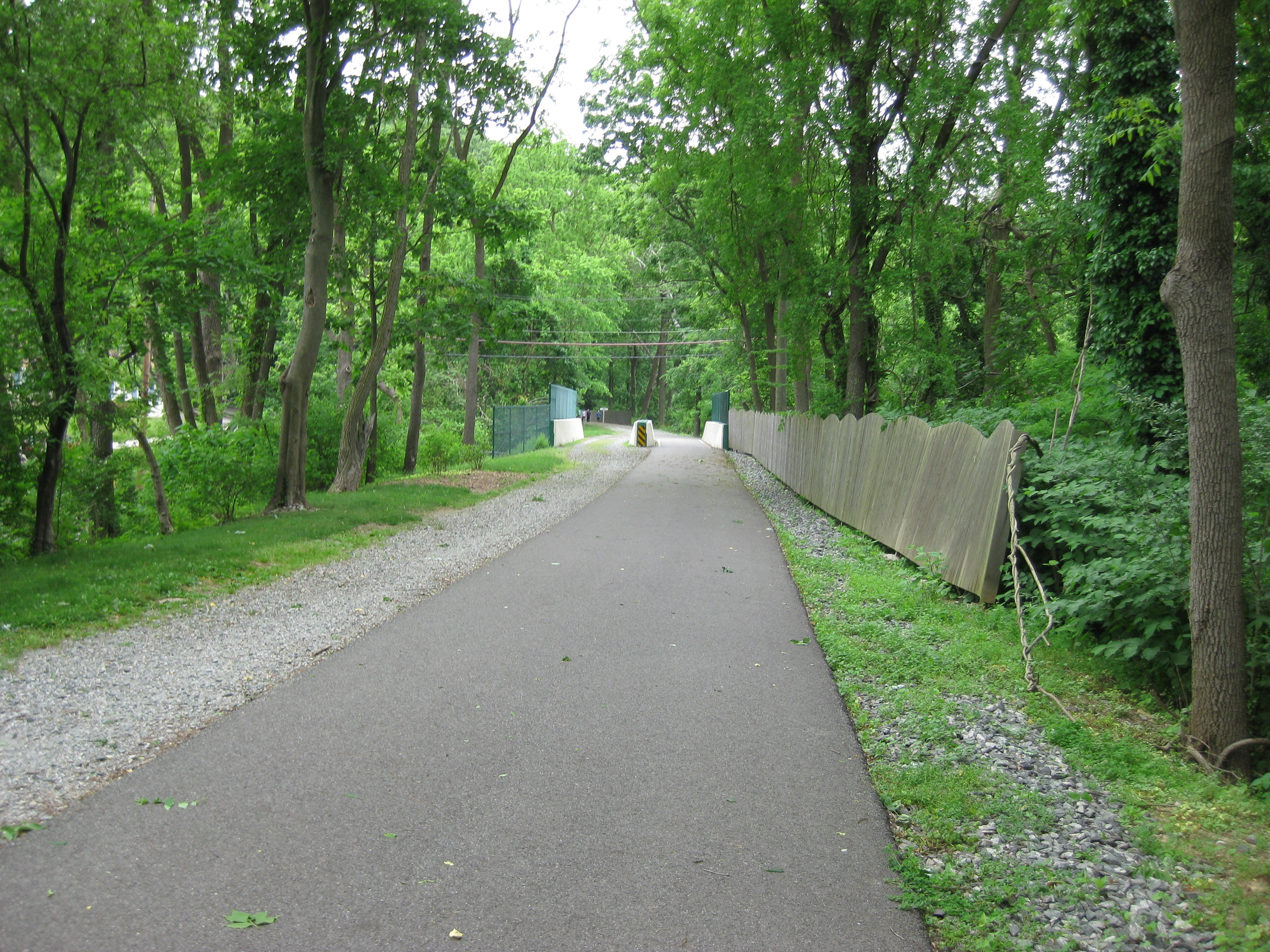
The Radnor Trail at the crossing of Conestoga Road in Wayne, Pennsylvania, formerly the road bed of the P&W Strafford Branch
