= Gulph Mills station =

Rapid transit station in Pennsylvania

Gulph Mills
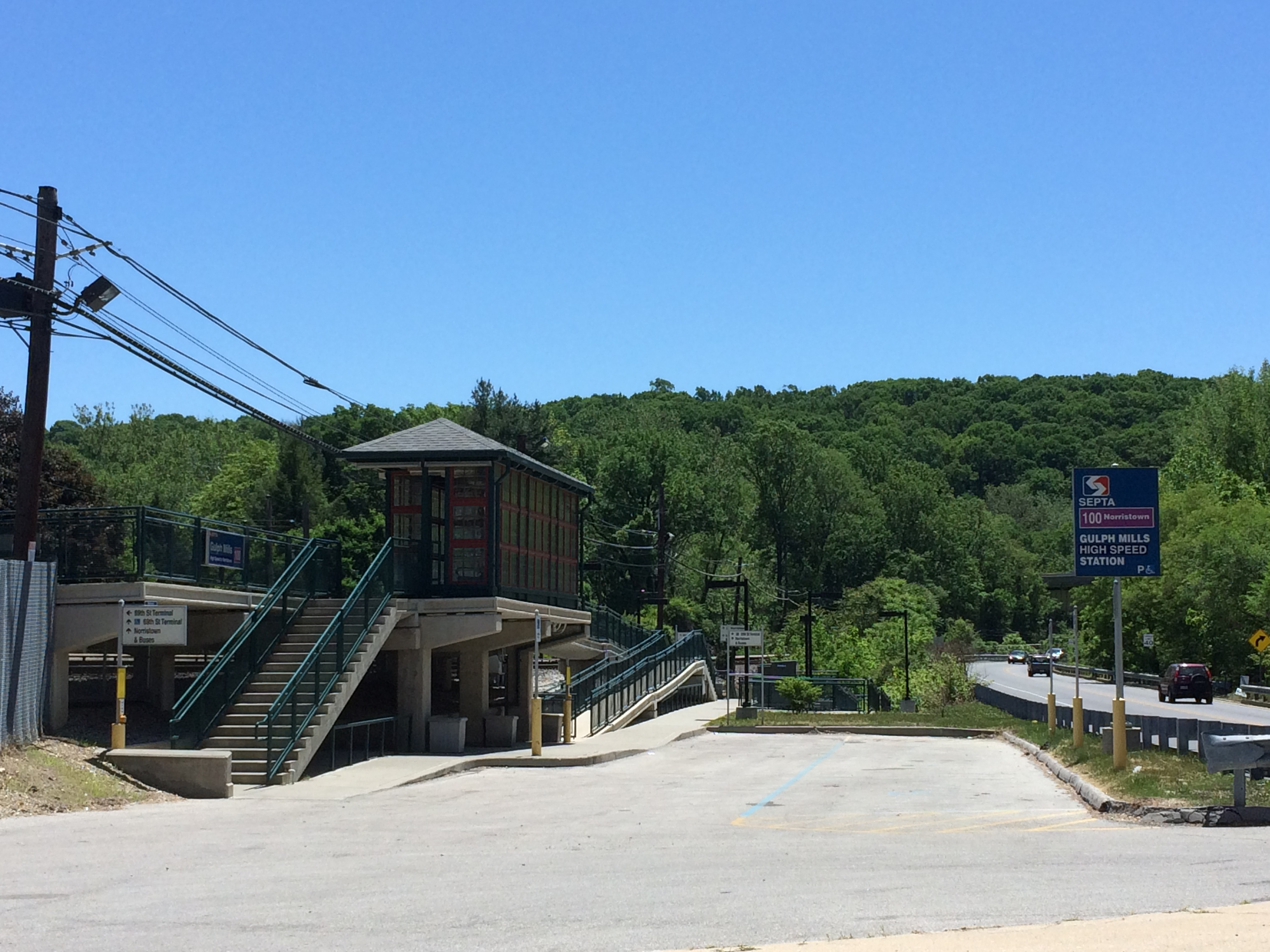
- The southbound platform of Gulph Mills station on South Gulph Road

General information
- Location: Trinity Road and Crest Lane; Upper Merion Township, Pennsylvania
- Coordinates: 40.0710°N 75.3423°W
- Owner: SEPTA
- Platforms: 2 side platforms
- Tracks: 2
- Connections: SEPTA Suburban Bus: 95, 124, 125

Construction
- Parking: Yes
- Accessible: Yes

History
- Rebuilt: 2007
- Electrified: Third rail

Services
Preceding station	SEPTA Metro	Following station
Hughes Park toward Norristown T.C.	M (SEPTA Metro)	Matsonford toward 69th Street T.C.
Former services
Preceding station	Lehigh Valley Transit Company	Following station
Hughes Park toward Allentown	Liberty Bell High Speed Line Until 1951	Matsonford toward 69th Street
Location

Gulph Mills station is a SEPTA Metro rapid transit station in Gulph Mills, Pennsylvania. It serves the M and is located at Trinity Road and Crest Lane in Upper Merion Township, however another parking lot can be found across the tracks on South Gulph Road. This parking lot is only accessible for northbound drivers along South Gulph Road, though. All trains stop at Gulph Mills. Transfers are available for buses to the King of Prussia Mall. The station lies 10.3 track miles (16.6 km) from 69th Street Terminal. There is off-street parking available at this station.

== History ==
The station was originally part of the Red Arrow Division of the Philadelphia Suburban Transportation Company. The station received a refurbish in 2008 which included new shelters and full ADA accessibility.

== Connections ==
Connections are available to SEPTA Suburban Bus routes 95, 124, and 125. Some private employers have connecting shuttles.
