= Matsonford station =

Rapid transit station in Pennsylvania

Matsonford
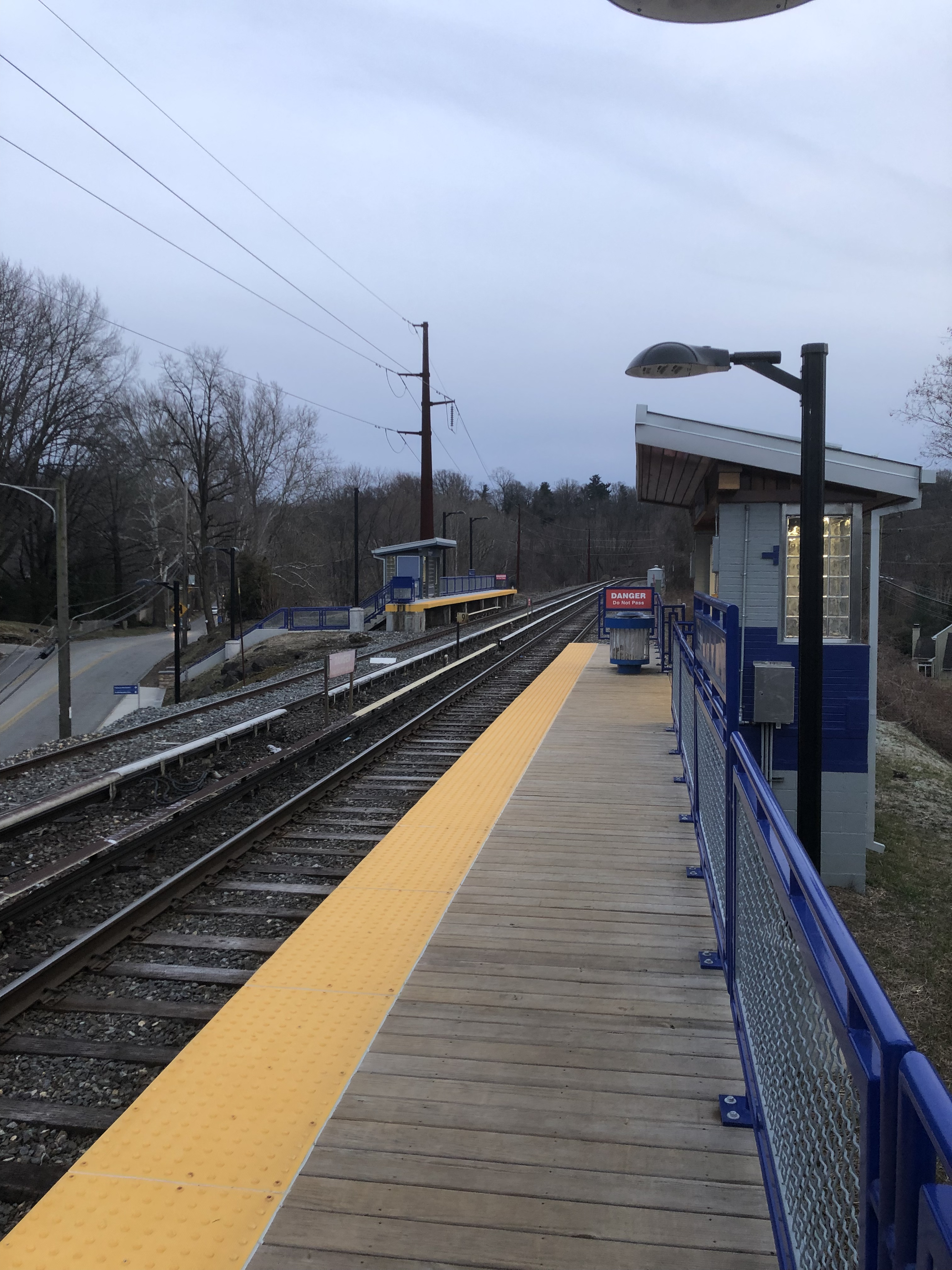
- Matsonford station in 2017

General information
- Location: Matsonford Road and Montgomery Avenue; Lower Merion Township, Pennsylvania
- Coordinates: 40.0582°N 75.3396°W
- Owner: SEPTA
- Platforms: 2 side platforms
- Tracks: 2

Construction
- Structure type: Elevated
- Parking: Yes
- Accessible: No

History
- Electrified: Third rail
- Former names: Conshohocken Road (until October 1995)

Services
Preceding station	SEPTA Metro	Following station
Gulph Mills toward Norristown T.C.	M (SEPTA Metro)	County Line toward 69th Street T.C.
Former services
Preceding station	Lehigh Valley Transit Company	Following station
Gulph Mills toward Allentown	Liberty Bell High Speed Line Until 1951	County Line toward 69th Street
Location

Matsonford station is a SEPTA Metro rapid transit station in Lower Merion Township, Pennsylvania. It serves the M and is located at Matsonford Road and Montgomery Avenue (PA 320). All trains stop at Matsonford. The station lies 9.4 track miles from 69th Street Terminal. There is off-street parking available at this station, over the southwest corner of Matsonford and Montgomery. The tracks run above the southeast corner and bridges can be found over both streets. Until October 1995, the station was named Conshohocken Road.

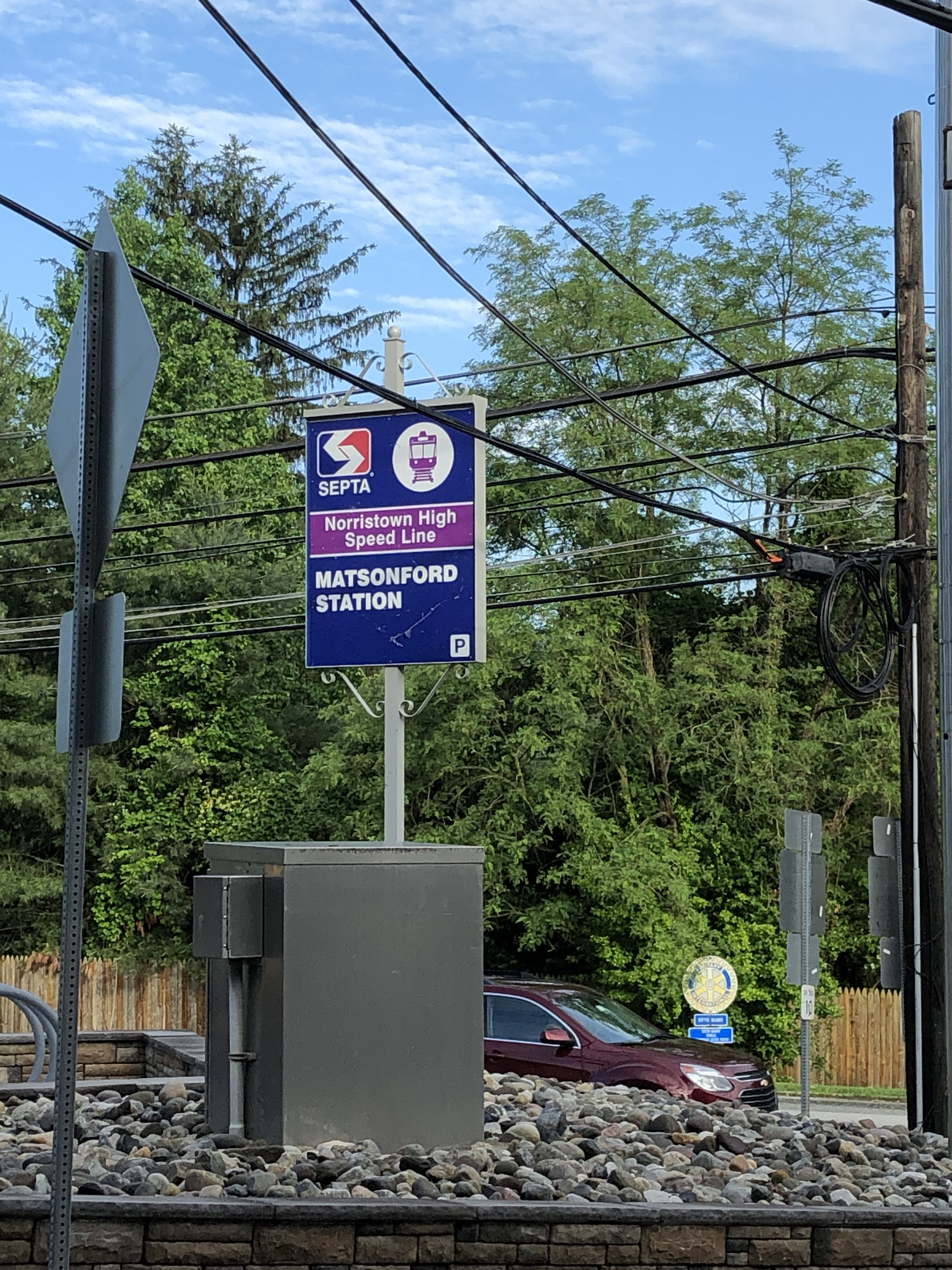
Matsonford station sign
