= County Line station (SEPTA Metro) =

Rapid transit station in Pennsylvania, US

County Line
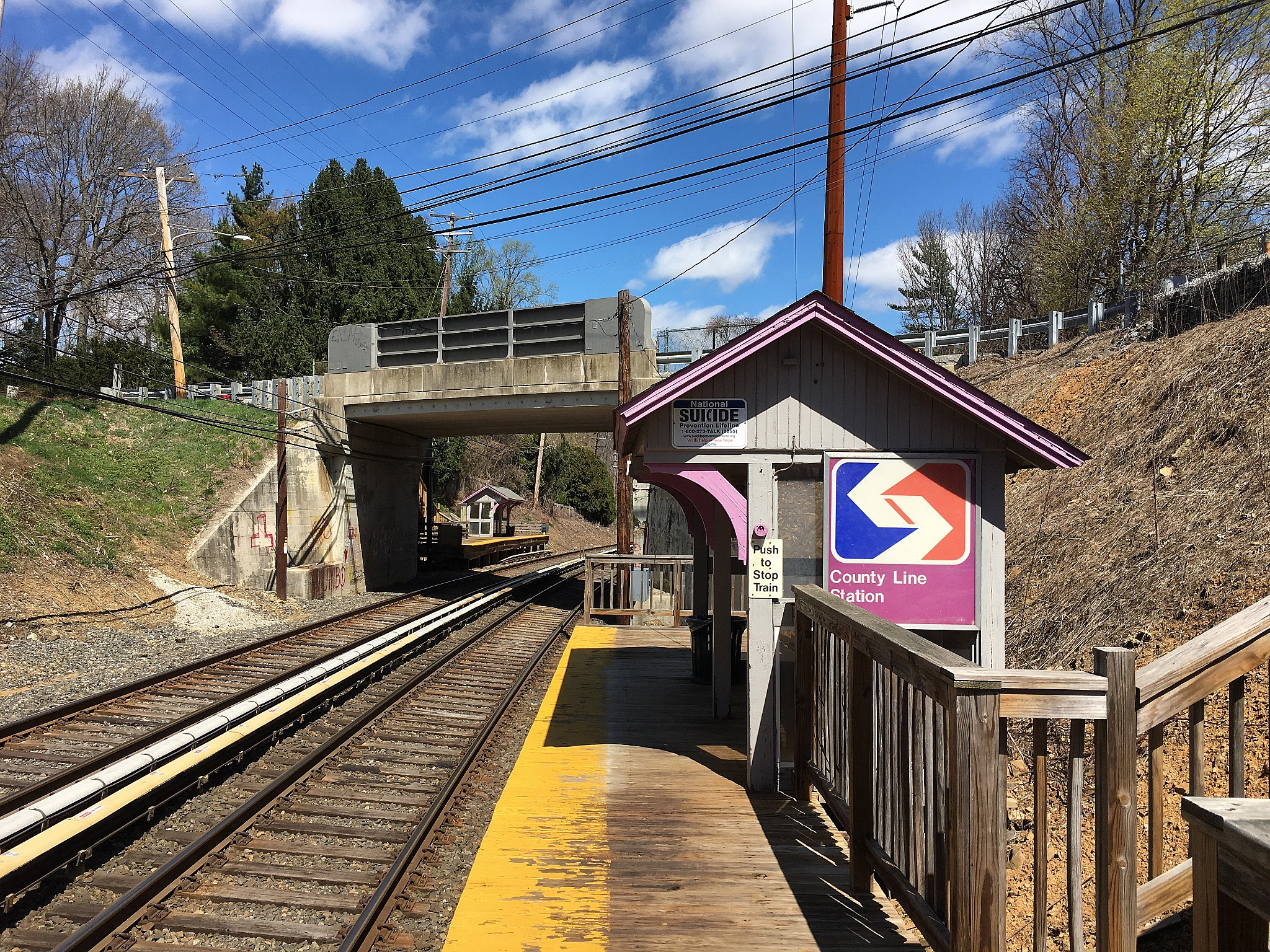

General information
- Location: County Line Road near Matsonford Road; Radnor Township, Pennsylvania.
- Coordinates: 40.0499°N 75.3474°W
- Owner: SEPTA
- Platforms: 2 side platforms
- Tracks: 2

Construction
- Parking: No
- Accessible: No

History
- Opened: c. 1930s
- Electrified: Third rail

Services
Preceding station	SEPTA Metro	Following station
Matsonford toward Norristown T.C.	M (SEPTA Metro)	Radnor toward 69th Street T.C.
Former services
Preceding station	Lehigh Valley Transit Company	Following station
Matsonford toward Allentown	Liberty Bell High Speed Line Until 1951	Radnor toward 69th Street
Location

County Line station is an interurban rapid transit station on the SEPTA Metro M. The station is located on County Line Road near Matsonford Road in Radnor Township, Pennsylvania. All trains stop at the County Line. Trains running south of this station cross under the Keystone Corridor (Philadelphia to Harrisburg Main Line) that carries the Paoli/Thorndale Line as well as Amtrak's Pennsylvanian and Keystone Service trains. The station lies 8.6 track miles (13.8 km) from 69th Street Terminal.

== History ==
The station was built as an infill station in the 1930s along the Lehigh Valley Transit Company line. The community raised $1,300 for the station's construction.

== Utilization ==
County Line station holds the distinction of being the station on the M Line with the least ridership. In 2021, it averaged 14 riders per day. The land use around the station is almost entirely single family residential homes.
