= DeKalb Street station =

Rapid transit station in Pennsylvania

DeKalb St
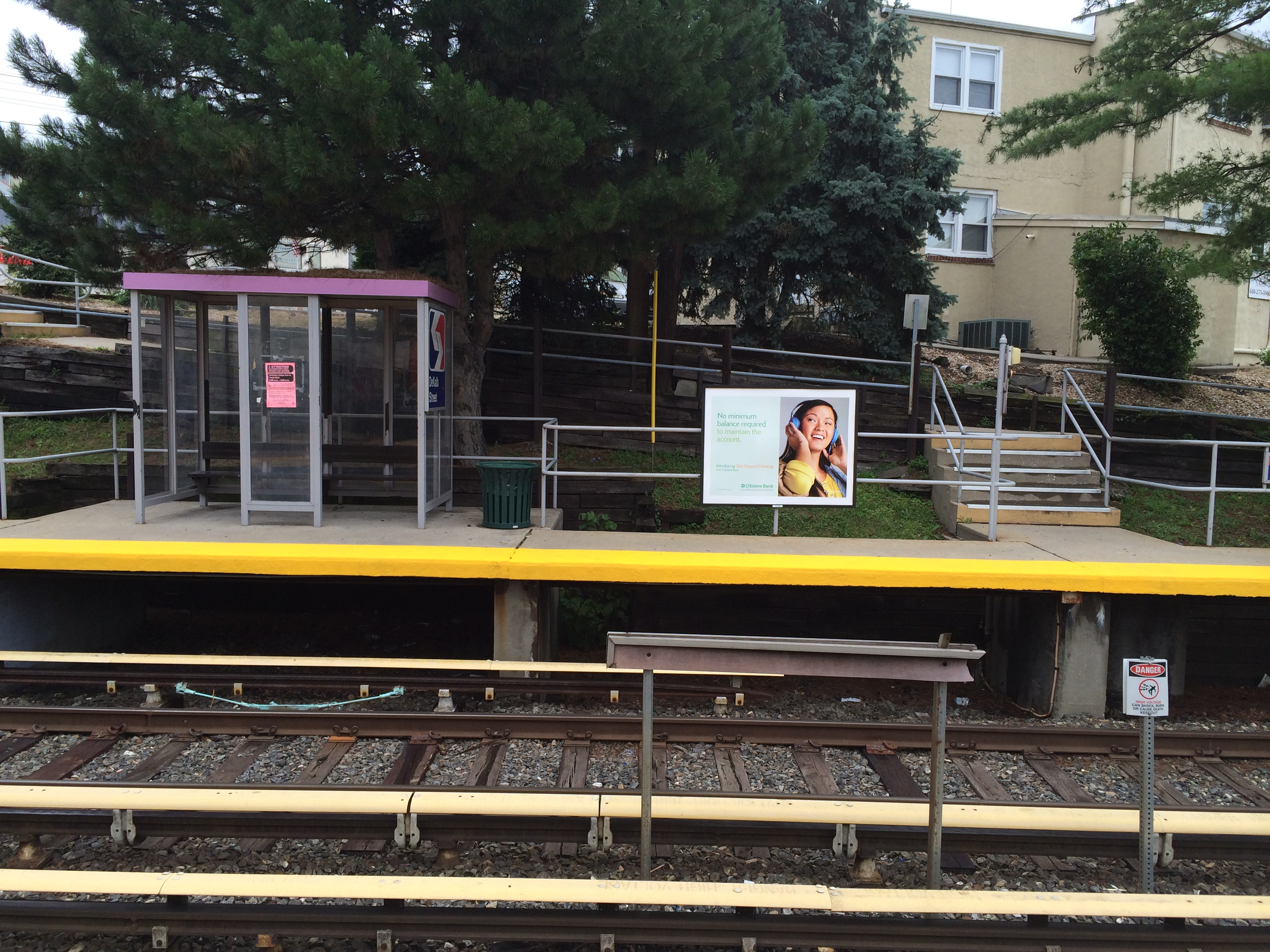

General information
- Location: Ford Street near DeKalb Street; Bridgeport, Pennsylvania,
- Coordinates: 40.0989°N 75.3520°W
- Owner: SEPTA
- Platforms: 2 side platforms
- Tracks: 2
- Connections: SEPTA Suburban Bus: 99

Construction
- Parking: Yes
- Accessible: No

History
- Opened: c. 1912
- Electrified: Third rail
- Former names: King Manor (–2010)

Services
Preceding station	SEPTA Metro	Following station
Bridgeport toward Norristown T.C.	M (SEPTA Metro)	Hughes Park toward 69th Street T.C.
Former services
Preceding station	Lehigh Valley Transit Company	Following station
Bridgeport toward Allentown	Liberty Bell High Speed Line Until 1951	Hughes Park toward 69th Street
Location

DeKalb Street station, formerly known as King Manor station, is a SEPTA Metro rapid transit station in Bridgeport, Pennsylvania. It serves the M and is located on Ford Street near DeKalb Street (U.S. Route 202), although SEPTA gives the address as Ford Street and Crooked Lane. All trains stop at DeKalb Street. The station lies 12.3 track miles (19.8 km) from 69th Street Terminal.

Originally named DeKalb Street station upon opening, the name was changed to King Manor. SEPTA reverted to the station name on September 5, 2010. The platform reflects the new name while the street sign retains the King Manor name.

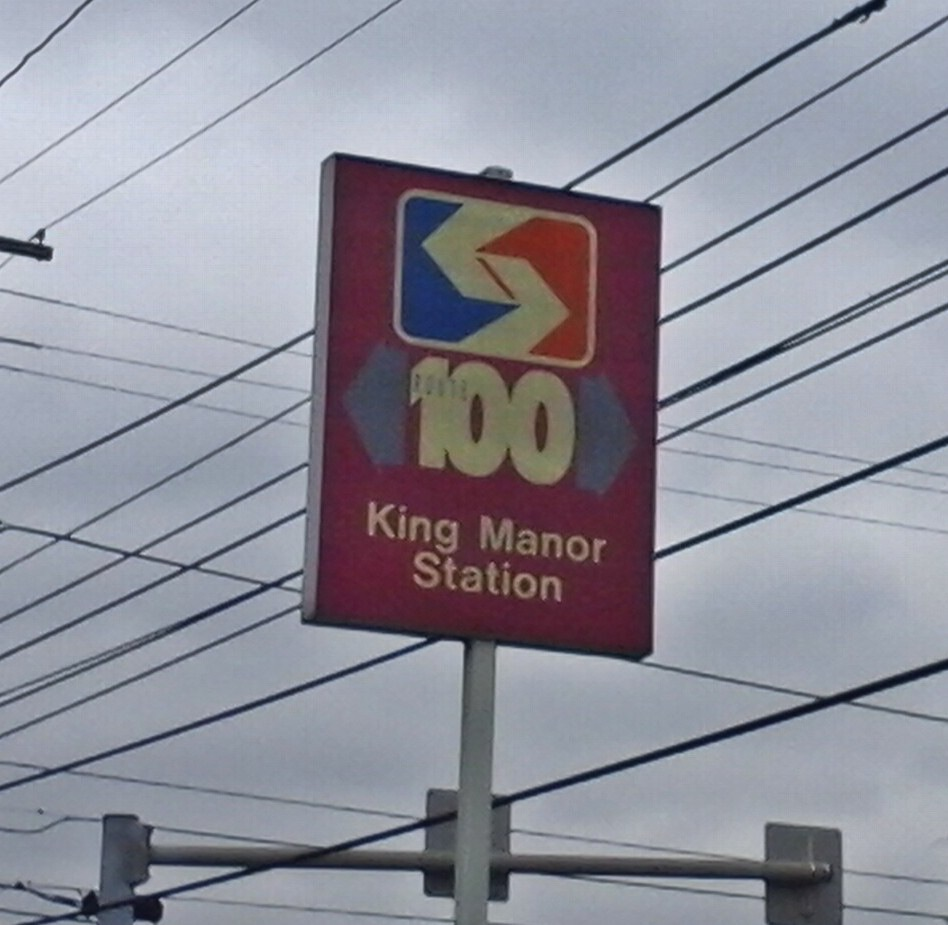
Street signage for Dekalb Street Station — July 2014
