= Hughes Park station =

Rapid transit station in Pennsylvania

Hughes Park
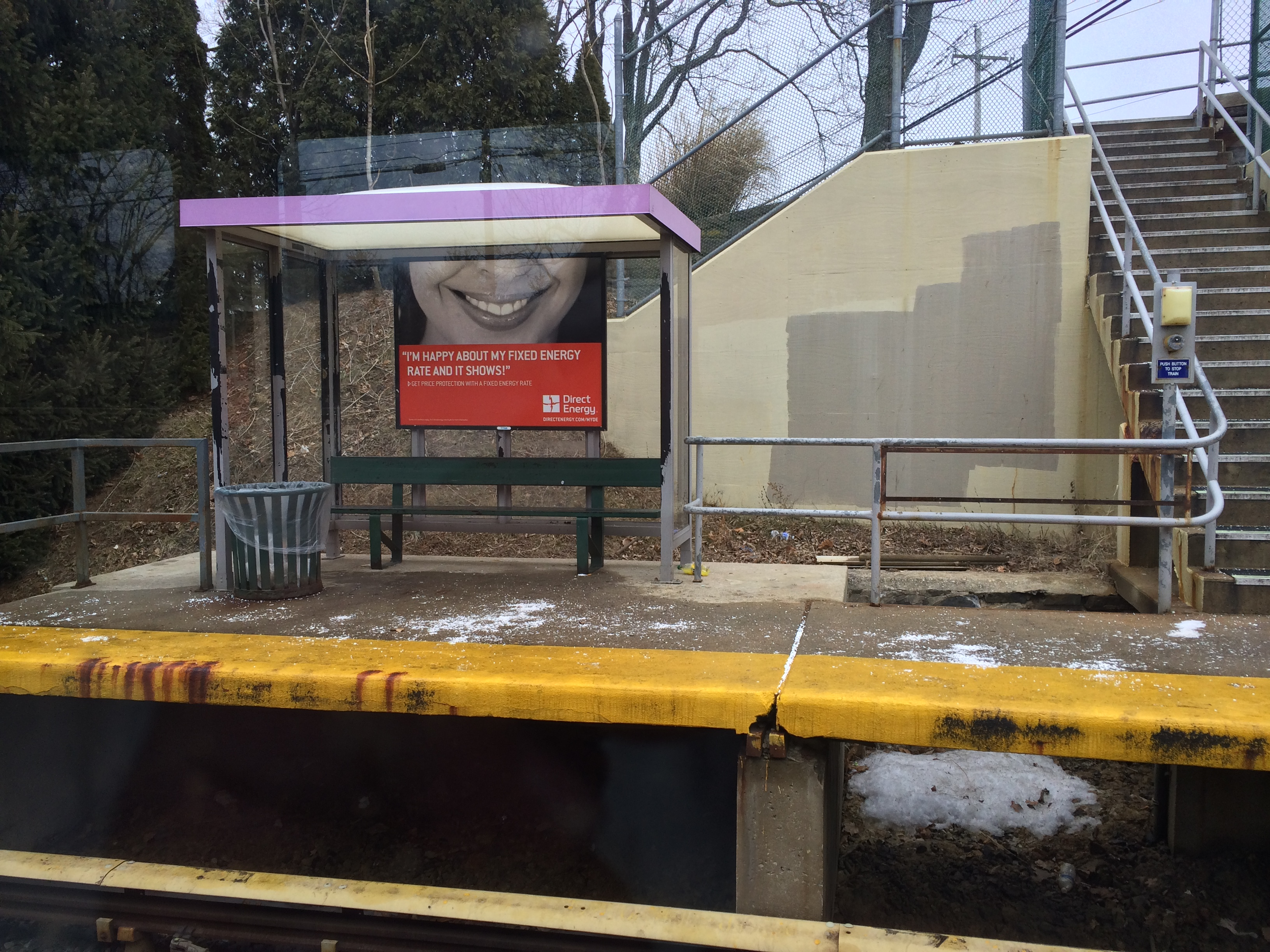

General information
- Location: Crooked Lane & Yerkes Road; Upper Merion Township, Pennsylvania
- Coordinates: 40.0812°N 75.3489°W
- Owner: SEPTA
- Platforms: 2 side platforms
- Tracks: 2

Construction
- Accessible: No

History
- Electrified: Third rail

Services
| Preceding station | SEPTA Metro | Following station |
|---|---|---|
| DeKalb Street toward Norristown T.C. | M (SEPTA Metro) | Gulph Mills toward 69th Street T.C. |
Former services
| Preceding station | Lehigh Valley Transit Company | Following station |
|---|---|---|
| King Manor toward Allentown | Liberty Bell High Speed Line Until 1951 | Gulph Mills toward 69th Street |
Location

Hughes Park station is a SEPTA Metro rapid transit station in Upper Merion Township, Pennsylvania. It serves the M and is located at Yerkes Road and Crooked Lane. All trains stop at Hughes Park. The station lies 11 track miles (18 km) from 69th Street Terminal.
