= Radnor South station =

SEPTA Metro station in Radnor, Pennsylvania

Radnor South
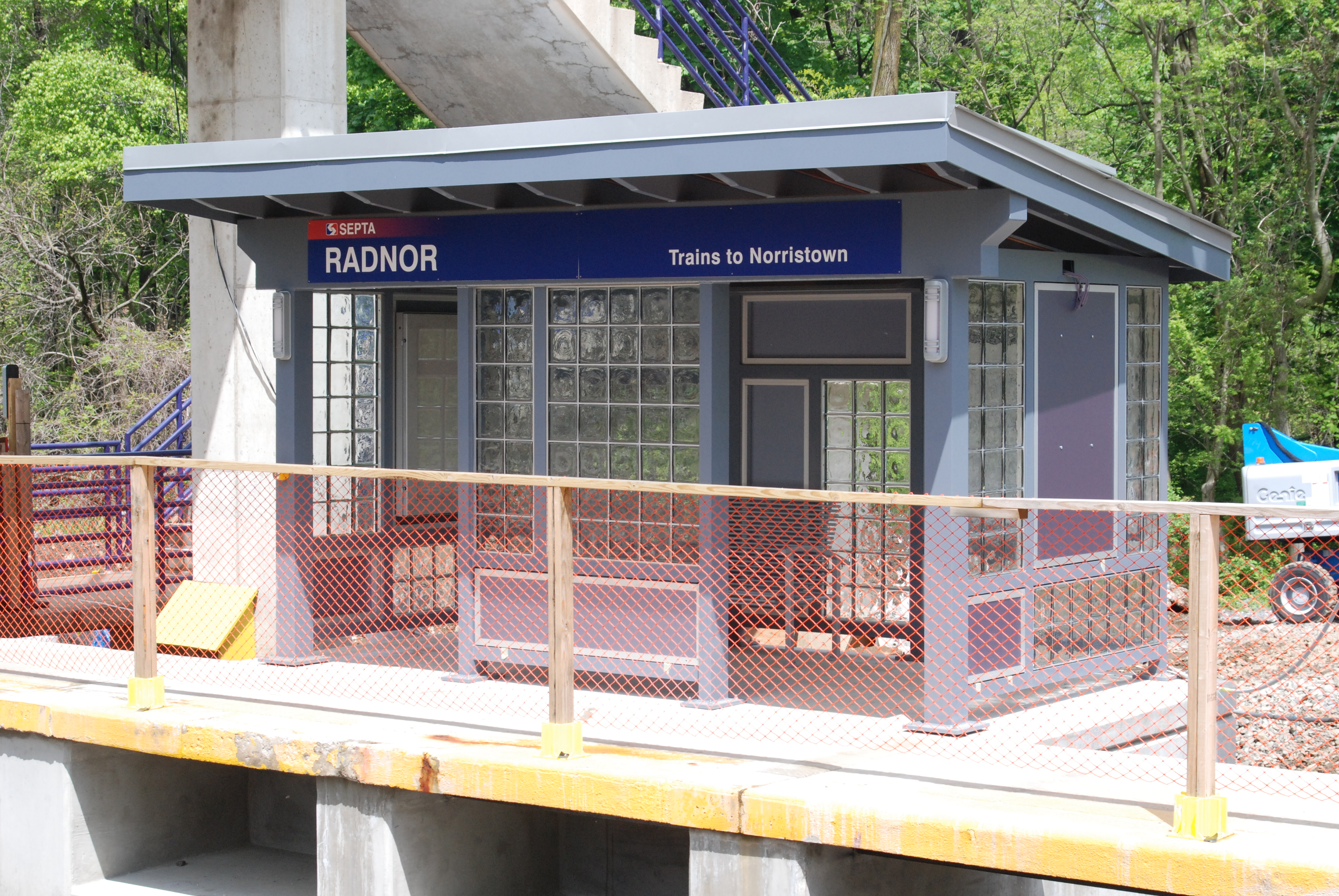
- Radnor station reconstruction in 2016

General information
- Location: Near Station Drive & King of Prussia Road; Radnor, Pennsylvania
- Coordinates: 40.0420°N 75.3537°W
- Owner: SEPTA
- Platforms: 2 side platforms
- Tracks: 2
- Connections: SEPTA Suburban Bus: 105

Construction
- Parking: Yes
- Accessible: No

Services
Preceding station	SEPTA Metro	Following station
County Line toward Norristown T.C.	M (SEPTA Metro)	Villanova South toward 69th Street T.C.
Former services
Preceding station	Lehigh Valley Transit Company	Following station
County Line toward Allentown	Liberty Bell High Speed Line Until 1951	Villanova South toward 69th Street
Preceding station	Philadelphia and Western Railroad	Following station
Ithan toward Strafford	Strafford Branch Until 1956	Villanova South toward 69th Street
Location

Radnor South station (formerly known as Radnor Station) is a SEPTA Metro rapid transit station in Radnor, Pennsylvania. It is in Radnor Township.

It serves the M and is located on King of Prussia Road. All trains stop at Radnor. The station is located near the Paoli/Thorndale Line Radnor station, and is close to Radnor High School and Archbishop John Carroll High School. Trains running northwest of this station cross under the Keystone Corridor (Philadelphia to Harrisburg Main Line) that carries the Paoli/Thorndale Line as well as Amtrak's Pennsylvanian and Keystone Service trains. The station lies 7.9 track miles (12.7 km) from 69th Street Terminal. The station has off-street parking available.
