= How I Built This =

American business podcast

- Genre: Business
- Language: English

Creative team
- Created by: Guy Raz

Cast and voices
- Hosted by: Guy Raz

Production
- Length: About 60 minutes

Publication
- Original release: September 12, 2016
- Provider: Wondery (podcast)/National Public Radio (radio)
- Updates: Weekly

Related
- Website: wondery.com/shows/how-i-built-this/

How I Built This is an American podcast about "innovators, entrepreneurs, idealists, and the stories behind the movements they built" produced by NPR.

== History ==
How I Built This began on September 12, 2016, as a podcast where the host, NPR journalist Guy Raz, talks to innovators, entrepreneurs, and idealists, about the stories behind the movements they built.

In 2018, due to the success of the program, Guy Raz launched the "How I Built This Summit" at the Yerba Buena Center for the Arts in San Francisco, California. The event features keynote speakers (many of whom have been featured on the podcast) and networking activities. The event also features career-focused workshops and breakout sessions for pass-holders.

In 2020, Guy Raz released his book How I Built This: The Unexpected Paths to Success from the World's Most Inspiring Entrepreneurs, which highlights key moments and stories from the podcast.

In 2022, How I Built This signed a licensing deal with Wondery, with subsequent radio distribution remaining with NPR.

== Awards ==
How I Built This has earned 13 podcast industry award nominations, including 4 wins. It won the 2023 Webby Award for Best Business Podcast.

== Episodes ==
Episode (NPR/ Wondery+)	Title	Notes	Airdate	Original Airdate
1	Spanx: Sara Blakely		September 12, 2016	
2	Instagram: Kevin Systrom and Mike Krieger		September 19, 2016	
3	Urban One: Cathy Hughes	company was called Radio One when episode was published	September 26, 2016	
4	Clif Bar: Gary Erickson		October 3, 2016	
5	VICE: Suroosh Alvi		October 10, 2016	
6	Airbnb: Joe Gebbia		October 17, 2016	
7	Dermalogica: Jane Wurwand		October 24, 2016	
8	Samuel Adams: Jim Koch		October 31, 2016	
9	Music Mogul: L.A. Reid	co-founded LaFace Records	November 7, 2016	
10	Celebrity Chef: José Andrés		November 14, 2016	
11	Southwest Airlines: Herb Kelleher		November 21, 2016	
12	Angie's List: Angie Hicks		November 28, 2016	
13	Serial Entrepreneur: Mark Cuban	appears on Shark Tank	December 5, 2016	
14	Patagonia: Yvon Chouinard		December 12, 2016	
15	Melissa & Doug: Melissa and Doug Bernstein		December 19, 2016	
16	Warby Parker: Dave Gilboa and Neil Blumenthal		December 26, 2016	
17	Zumba: Beto Perez and Alberto Perlman		January 2, 2017	
18	Drybar: Alli Webb		January 9, 2017	
19	Honest Tea: Seth Goldman		January 16, 2017	
20	Zappos: Tony Hsieh		January 23, 2017	
21	Virgin Group: Sir Richard Branson		January 30, 2017	
22	Kate Spade: Kate and Andy Spade		February 6, 2017	
23	Lyft: John Zimmer		February 13, 2017	
24	Live Episode! Beyond Meat: Ethan Brown		February 16, 2017	
25	Crate & Barrel: Gordon Segal		February 20, 2017	
26	Atari and Chuck E. Cheese's: Nolan Bushnell		February 27, 2017	
27	Chesapeake Bay Candle: Mei Xu		March 6, 2017	
28	5-Hour Energy: Manoj Bhargava		March 13, 2017	
29	Kendra Scott: Kendra Scott		March 20, 2017	
30	Power Rangers: Haim Saban		March 27, 2017	
31	AOL: Steve Case		April 3, 2017	
32	Instacart: Apoorva Mehta		April 10, 2017	
33	1-800-GOT-JUNK?: Brian Scudamore		April 17, 2017	
34	Real Estate Mogul: Barbara Corcoran	appears on Shark Tank	April 24, 2017	
35	Lady Gaga and Atom Factory: Troy Carter		May 1, 2017	
36	Lonely Planet: Maureen and Tony Wheeler		May 8, 2017	
37	Whole Foods Market: John Mackey		May 15, 2017	
38	Compaq: Rod Canion		May 22, 2017	
39	TOMS: Blake Mycoskie		May 29, 2017	
40	Five Guys: Jerry Murrell		June 5, 2017	
41	Carol's Daughter: Lisa Price		June 12, 2017	
42	WeWork: Miguel McKelvey		June 19, 2017	
43	TRX: Randy Hetrick		June 26, 2017	
44	Spanx: Sara Blakely*		July 3, 2017	September 12, 2016
45	Rolling Stone: Jann Wenner		July 11, 2017	
46	Aden + Anais: Raegan Moya-Jones		July 17, 2017	
47	Samuel Adams: Jim Koch*		July 24, 2017	October 31, 2016
48	Live Episode! BuzzFeed: Jonah Peretti	also co-founded The Huffington Post	July 27, 2017	
49	Kickstarter: Perry Chen		July 31, 2017	
50	Rent The Runway: Jenn Hyman		August 7, 2017	
51	Urban One: Cathy Hughes*		August 14, 2017	September 26, 2016
52	Edible Arrangements: Tariq Farid		August 21, 2017	
53	Airbnb: Joe Gebbia*		August 28, 2017	October 17, 2016
54	Live Episode! Reddit: Alexis Ohanian and Steve Huffman		August 31, 2017	
55	VICE: Suroosh Alvi*		September 4, 2017	October 10, 2016
56	Barre3: Sadie Lincoln		September 11, 2017	
57	The Chipmunks: Ross Bagdasarian Jr. and Janice Karman		September 18, 2017	
58	Southwest Airlines: Herb Kelleher*		September 25, 2017	November 21, 2016
59	Live Episode! Starbucks: Howard Schultz		September 28, 2017	
60	Stonyfield Yogurt: Gary Hirshberg		October 2, 2017	
61	Teach For America: Wendy Kopp		October 9, 2017	
62	Bumble: Whitney Wolfe		October 16, 2017	
63	Burton Snowboards: Jake Carpenter		October 23, 2017	
64	Chipotle: Steve Ells		October 30, 2017	
65	Eileen Fisher: Eileen Fisher		November 6, 2017	
66	Instagram: Kevin Systrom and Mike Krieger*		November 13, 2017	September 19, 2016
67	Ben & Jerry's: Ben Cohen and Jerry Greenfield		November 20, 2017	
68	Framebridge: Susan Tynan		November 27, 2017	
69	Zumba: Beto Perez and Alberto Perlman*		December 4, 2017	January 2, 2017
70	Tom's of Maine: Tom Chappell		December 11, 2017	
71	Live Episode! Black Entertainment Television: Robert Johnson		December 14, 2017	
72	LearnVest: Alexa von Tobel		December 17, 2017	
73	Patagonia: Yvon Chouinard*		December 25, 2017	December 12, 2016
74	Live Episode! The Home Depot: Arthur Blank		December 27, 2017	
75	Clif Bar: Gary Erickson*		January 1, 2018	October 3, 2016
76	Kate Spade: Kate and Andy Spade*		January 8, 2018	February 6, 2017
77	LinkedIn: Reid Hoffman		January 15, 2018	
78	Serial Entrepreneur: Marcia Kilgore	founded Bliss (spa)	January 22, 2018	
79	Dell Computers: Michael Dell		January 29, 2018	
80	Melissa & Doug: Melissa And Doug Bernstein*		February 5, 2018	December 19, 2016
81	Dyson: James Dyson		February 12, 2018	
82	Warby Parker: Dave Gilboa and Neil Blumenthal*		February 19, 2018	December 26, 2016
83	Wikipedia: Jimmy Wales		February 26, 2018	
84	Live Episode! Jeni's Splendid Ice Creams: Jeni Britton Bauer		February 28, 2018	
85	1-800-GOT-JUNK?: Brian Scudamore*		March 5, 2018	April 17, 2017
86	The Knot: Carley Roney and David Liu		March 12, 2018	
87	Lärabar: Lara Merriken		March 19, 2018	
88	Atari and Chuck E. Cheese's: Nolan Bushnell*		March 26, 2018	February 27, 2017
89	Stitch Fix: Katrina Lake		April 2, 2018	
90	Fubu: Daymond John	appears on Shark Tank	April 9, 2018	
91	Wayfair: Niraj Shah and Steve Conine		April 16, 2018	
92	Dermalogica: Jane Wurwand*		April 23, 2018	October 24, 2016
93	Panera Bread/Au Bon Pain: Ron Shaich		April 30, 2018	
94	Stripe: Patrick and John Collison		May 7, 2018	
95	Real Estate Mogul: Barbara Corcoran*		May 14, 2018	April 24, 2017
96	Bob's Red Mill: Bob Moore		May 21, 2018	
97	Lady Gaga and Atom Factory: Troy Carter*		May 28, 2018	May 1, 2017
98	Minted: Mariam Naficy		June 4, 2018	
99	Remembering Kate Spade*		June 5, 2018	February 6, 2017
100	Honest Tea: Seth Goldman*		June 11, 2018	January 16, 2017
101	Lululemon Athletica: Chip Wilson		June 18, 2018	
102	Lyft: John Zimmer*		June 25, 2018	February 13, 2017
103	Chicken Salad Chick: Stacy Brown		July 2, 2018	
104	Lonely Planet: Maureen and Tony Wheeler*		July 9, 2018	May 8, 2017
105	Steve Madden: Steve Madden		July 16, 2018	
106	Drybar: Alli Webb*		July 23, 2018	January 9, 2017
107	Slack: Stewart Butterfield		July 30, 2018	
108	Carol's Daughter: Lisa Price*		August 6, 2018	June 12, 2017
109	Live Episode! RXBAR: Peter Rahal		August 13, 2018	
110	Angie's List: Angie Hicks*		August 20, 2018	November 28, 2016
111	TRX: Randy Hetrick*		August 27, 2018	June 26, 2017
112	WeWork: Miguel McKelvey*		September 3, 2018	June 19, 2017
113	Live Episode! New Belgium Brewing Company: Kim Jordan		September 10, 2018	
114	Bobbi Brown Cosmetics: Bobbi Brown		September 17, 2018	
115	Power Rangers: Haim Saban*		September 24, 2018	March 27, 2017
116	Cisco Systems and Urban Decay Cosmetics: Sandy Lerner		October 1, 2018	
117	Method: Adam Lowry and Eric Ryan		October 8, 2018	
118	Rent The Runway: Jenn Hyman*		October 15, 2018	August 7, 2017
119	Tempur-Pedic: Bobby Trussell		October 22, 2018	
120	Betterment: Jon Stein		October 29, 2018	
121	Barre3: Sadie Lincoln*		November 5, 2018	September 11, 2017
122	DoorDash: Tony Xu		November 12, 2018	
123	Rent the Runway's Jenn Hyman At The HIBT Summit	Special Episode – Original Story from August 7, 2017	November 15, 2018	
124	Whole Foods Market: John Mackey*		November 19, 2018	May 15, 2017
125	Method's Adam Lowry And Eric Ryan at the HIBT Summit	Special Episode – Original Story from October 8, 2018	November 22, 2018	
126	Live Episode! Glossier: Emily Weiss		November 26, 2018	
127	Lyft's John Zimmer At The HIBT Summit	Special Episode – Original Story from February 13, 2017	November 29, 2018	
128	ActOne Group: Janice Bryant Howroyd		December 3, 2018	
129	Airbnb's Joe Gebbia At The HIBT Summit	Special Episode – Original Story from October 17, 2016	December 6, 2018	
130	Burton Snowboards: Jake Carpenter*		December 10, 2018	October 23, 2017
131	Stitch Fix's Katrina Lake At The HIBT Summit	Special Episode – Original Story from April 2, 2018	December 13, 2018	
132	Live Episode! Dollar Shave Club: Michael Dubin		December 17, 2018	
133	Lisa Price Of Carol's Daughter At The HIBT Summit	Special Episode – Original Story from June 12, 2017	December 20, 2018	
134	The Chipmunks: Ross Bagdasarian Jr. and Janice Karman*		December 24, 2018	September 18, 2017
135	Kickstarter: Perry Chen*		December 31, 2018	July 31, 2017
136	Remembering Herb Kelleher*		January 4, 2019	November 21, 2016
137	SoulCycle: Julie Rice and Elizabeth Cutler		January 7, 2019	
138	Five Guys: Jerry Murrell*		January 14, 2019	June 5, 2017
139	Bonobos: Andy Dunn		January 21, 2019	
140	Canva: Melanie Perkins		January 28, 2019	
141	JetBlue Airways: David Neeleman		February 4, 2019	
142	TOMS: Blake Mycoskie*		February 11, 2019	May 29, 2017
143	Burt's Bees: Roxanne Quimby		February 18, 2019	
144	Eileen Fisher: Eileen Fisher*		February 25, 2019	November 6, 2017
145	Squarespace: Anthony Casalena		March 4, 2019	
146	Logic: Logic and Chris Zarou		March 11, 2019	
147	Away: Jen Rubio		March 18, 2019	
148	Compaq: Rod Canion*		March 25, 2019	May 22, 2017
149	Springfree Trampoline: Keith Alexander and Steve Holmes		April 1, 2019	
150	Chez Panisse: Alice Waters		April 8, 2019	
151	Men's Wearhouse: George Zimmer		April 15, 2019	
152	Bumble: Whitney Wolfe Herd*		April 22, 2019	October 16, 2017
153	Live Episode! Peloton: John Foley		April 29, 2019	
154	Framebridge: Susan Tynan*		May 6, 2019	November 27, 2017
155	Belkin International: Chet Pipkin		May 13, 2019	
156	Zappos: Tony Hsieh*		May 20, 2019	January 23, 2017
157	Stacy's Pita Chips: Stacy Madison		May 27, 2019	
158	Live Episode! Tofurky: Seth Tibbott		June 3, 2019	
159	Allbirds: Tim Brown and Joey Zwillinger		June 10, 2019	
160	Chesapeake Bay Candle: Mei Xu*		June 17, 2019	March 6, 2017
161	Yelp: Jeremy Stoppelman		June 24, 2019	
162	Dave's Killer Bread: Dave Dahl		July 1, 2019	
163	Teach For America: Wendy Kopp*		July 8, 2019	October 9, 2017
164	EO Products: Susan Griffin-Black and Brad Black		July 15, 2019	
165	Dyson: James Dyson*		July 22, 2019	February 12, 2018
166	Live Episode! Angie's BOOMCHICKAPOP: Angie and Dan Bastian		July 29, 2019	
167	Shopify: Tobias Lütke		August 5, 2019	
168	Serial Entrepreneur: Marcia Kilgore*		August 12, 2019	January 22, 2018
169	Stonyfield Yogurt: Gary Hirshberg*		August 19, 2019	October 2, 2017
170	Aden + Anais: Raegan Moya-Jones*		August 26, 2019	July 17, 2017
171	The Life Is Good Company: Bert and John Jacobs		September 2, 2019	
172	Dippin' Dots: Curt Jones		September 9, 2019	
173	Stitch Fix: Katrina Lake*		September 16, 2019	April 2, 2018
174	Headspace: Andy Puddicombe and Rich Pierson		September 23, 2019	
175	Live Episode! Walker and Company: Tristan Walker		September 30, 2019	
176	The Knot: Carley Roney and David Liu*		October 7, 2019	March 12, 2018
177	Live Episode! Milk Bar: Christina Tosi		October 14, 2019	
178	Gimlet Media: Alex Blumberg and Matt Lieber		October 21, 2019	
179	Lärabar: Lara Merriken*		October 28, 2019	March 19, 2018
180	Fubu: Daymond John*	appears on Shark Tank	November 4, 2019	April 9, 2018
181	Live Episode! Luke's Lobster: Luke Holden and Ben Conniff		November 7, 2019	
182	Evite: Selina Tobaccowala|		November 11, 2019	
183	Crate & Barrel: Gordon Segal*		November 18, 2019	February 20, 2017
184	Remembering Jake Burton Carpenter*		November 21, 2019	October 23, 2017
185	Outdoor Voices: Tyler Haney		November 25, 2019	
186	Live Episode! OtterBox: Curt Richardson		December 2, 2019	
187	Live From The HIBT Summit: Sara Blakely Of Spanx	Special Episode – Original Story from September 12, 2016	December 5, 2019	
188	Minted: Mariam Naficy*		December 9, 2019	June 4, 2018
189	Live From The HIBT Summit: Troy Carter	Special Episode – Original Story from May 1, 2017	December 12, 2019	
190	Tate's Bake Shop: Kathleen King		December 16, 2019	
191	Live From The HIBT Summit: Instagram: Kevin Systrom and Mike Krieger	Special Episode – Original Story from September 19, 2016	December 19, 2019	
192	Steve Madden: Steve Madden*		December 23, 2019	July 16, 2018
193	Live From The HIBT Summit: Edible Arrangements: Tariq Farid	Special Episode – Original Story from August 21, 2017	December 19, 2019	
194	Chicken Salad Chick: Stacy Brown*		December 30, 2019	July 2, 2018
195	Dell Computers: Michael Dell*		January 6, 2020	January 29, 2018
196	Live From The HIBT Summit: Serial Entrepreneur: Marcia Kilgore	Special Episode – Original Story from January 22, 2018	January 9, 2020	
197	Spindrift: Bill Creelman		January 13, 2020	
198	Happy Family Organics: Shazi Visram		January 20, 2020	
199	Wikipedia: Jimmy Wales*		January 27, 2020	February 26, 2018
200	Live From The HIBT Summit: Stewart Butterfield	Special Episode – Original Story from July 30, 2018	January 30, 2020	
201	M.M.LaFleur: Sarah LaFleur		February 3, 2020	
202	Panera Bread/Au Bon Pain: Ron Shaich*		February 10, 2020	April 30, 2018
203	Live From The HIBT Summit: David Neeleman of JetBlue Airways	Special Episode – Original Story from February 4, 2019	February 13, 2020	
204	Eventbrite: Julia Hartz		February 17, 2020	
205	Lululemon Athletica: Chip Wilson*		February 24, 2020	June 18, 2018
206	Live From The HIBT Summit: Jeni Britton Bauer of Jeni's Splendid Ice Creams		February 27, 2020	
207	Video Artist: Casey Neistat		March 2, 2020	
208	Stripe: Patrick and John Collison*		March 9, 2020	May 7, 2018
209	Live From The HIBT Summit: Stacy Madison of Stacy's Pita Chips	Special Episode – Original Story from May 27, 2019	March 12, 2020	
210	Birchbox: Katia Beauchamp		March 16, 2020	
211	Ben & Jerry's: Ben Cohen and Jerry Greenfield*		March 23, 2020	November 20, 2017
212	Sierra Nevada Brewing Company: Ken Grossman		March 30, 2020	
213	How I Built Resilience: Live with Jeni Britton Bauer		April 2, 2020	
214	S'well: Sarah Kauss		April 6, 2020	
215	How I Built Resilience: Live with Susan Griffin-Black		April 9, 2020	
216	Sweetgreen: Nicolas Jammet and Jonathan Neman		April 13, 2020	
217	How I Built Resilience: Live with David Neeleman and Tristan Walker		April 16, 2020	
218	Brooklinen: Vicki and Rich Fulop		April 20, 2020	
219	How I Built Resilience: Live with Simon Sinek		April 23, 2020	
220	Fitbit: James Park		April 27, 2020	
221	How I Built Resilience: Live with José Andrés		April 30, 2020	
222	Cotopaxi: Davis Smith		May 4, 2020	
223	How I Built Resilience: Live with Christina Tosi and Gary Erickson and Kit Crawford		May 7, 2020	
224	How I Built Resilience: Live with Stewart Butterfield and Steve Holmes		May 9, 2020	
225	Impossible Foods: Pat Brown		May 11, 2020	
226	How I Built Resilience: Live with Samin Nosrat and Alice Waters and Fanny Singer		May 14, 2020	
227	How I Built Resilience: Live with Tobias Lütke and Jon Stein		May 16, 2020	
228	Jo Loves: Jo Malone CBE		May 18, 2020	
229	How I Built Resilience: Live with Tony Xu and Marcia Kilgore		May 21, 2020	
230	How I Built Resilience: Live with Sarah LaFleur		May 23, 2020	
231	reCAPTCHA and Duolingo: Luis von Ahn		May 25, 2020	
232	How I Built Resilience: Live with Kyle Connaughton and Daniel Humm		May 28, 2020	
233	How I Built Resilience: Live with Alli Webb and Andy Puddicombe and Rich Pierson		May 30, 2020	
234	Sub Pop Records: Bruce Pavitt and Jonathan Poneman		June 1, 2020	
235	How I Built Resilience: Live with Jenn Hyman		June 4, 2020	
236	How I Built Resilience: Live with Troy Carter		June 6, 2020	
237	Supergoop!: Holly Thaggard		June 8, 2020	
238	How I Built Resilience: Live with Kevin Hart		June 11, 2020	
239	How I Built Resilience: Live with Y-Vonne Hutchinson		June 13, 2020	
240	Shake Shack: Danny Meyer		June 15, 2020	
241	How I Built Resilience: Live with Cathy Hughes		June 18, 2020	
242	How I Built Resilience: Live with Sadie Lincoln		June 20, 2020	
243	Ring: Jamie Siminoff		June 22, 2020	
244	How I Built Resilience: Live with Deval Patrick		June 25, 2020	
245	How I Built Resilience: Live with Melanie Perkins and Bill Creelman		June 27, 2020	
246	ClassPass: Payal Kadakia		June 29, 2020	
247	Tempur-Pedic: Bobby Trussell*		July 6, 2020	October 22, 2018
248	How I Built Resilience: Live with Sharon Chuter		July 9, 2020	
249	How I Built Resilience: Live with Morgan DeBaun		July 11, 2020	
250	Tatcha: Vicky Tsai		July 13, 2020	
251	How I Built Resilience: Live with Julia Hartz		July 16, 2020	
252	How I Built Resilience: Live with John Foley		July 18, 2020	
253	La Colombe Coffee Roasters: Todd Carmichael and J.P. Iberti		July 20, 2020	
254	How I Built Resilience: Songe LaRon of Squire		July 23, 2020	
255	How I Built Resilience: Jeremy Zimmer of United Talent Agency		July 25, 2020	
256	The Laundress: Lindsey Boyd		July 27, 2020	
257	How I Built Resilience: Taha Bawa of Goodwall		July 30, 2020	
258	How I Built Resilience: Sarah Harden and Lauren Neustadter of Hello Sunshine		August 1, 2020	
259	Vita Coco: Michael Kirban		August 3, 2020	
260	How I Built Resilience: Alberto Perlman of Zumba		August 6, 2020	
261	How I Built Resilience: Jessie Woolley-Wilson of DreamBox		August 8, 2020	
262	Briogeo: Nancy Twine		August 10, 2020	
263	How I Built Resilience: Brian Chesky of Airbnb		August 13, 2020	
264	How I Built Resilience: Samantha Bee of Full Frontal with Samantha Bee		August 15, 2020	
265	Zocdoc: Oliver Kharraz		August 17, 2020	
266	Wayfair: Niraj Shah and Steve Conine*		August 24, 2020	April 16, 2018
267	How I Built Resilience: Ajay Prakash and James Joun of Rinse		August 27, 2020	
268	How I Built Resilience: Niraj Shah and Steve Conine of Wayfair		August 29, 2020	
269	Chilewich: Sandy Chilewich		August 31, 2020	
270	How I Built Resilience: Luke Holden and Ben Conniff of Luke's Lobster		September 3, 2020	
271	How I Built Resilience: Sandra Oh Lin of KiwiCo		September 5, 2020	
272	Rad Power Bikes: Mike Radenbaugh		September 7, 2020	
273	How I Built Resilience: Pokimane		September 10, 2020	
274	How I Built Resilience (Special Edition): Guy Raz		September 12, 2020	
275	Calendly: Tope Awotona		September 14, 2020	
276	How I Built Resilience: Bert and John Jacobs of The Life Is Good Company		September 17, 2020	
277	How I Built Resilience: Whitney Wolfe Herd of Bumble		September 19, 2020	
278	Khan Academy: Sal Khan		September 21, 2020	
279	How I Built Resilience: John Zimmer of Lyft		September 26, 2020	
280	Health-Ade Kombucha: Daina Trout		September 28, 2020	
281	How I Built Resilience: Jeremy Stoppelman of Yelp		October 1, 2020	
282	How I Built Resilience: Jennifer Neundorfer of January Ventures		October 3, 2020	
283	Lush Cosmetics: Mark Constantine		October 5, 2020	
284	How I Built Resilience: Aishetu Dozie of Bossy Cosmetics		October 8, 2020	
285	How I Built Resilience: Cynt Marshall of Dallas Mavericks		October 10, 2020	
286	Method: Adam Lowry and Eric Ryan (2018)*		October 12, 2020	October 8, 2018
287	McBride Sisters Wine (Part 1 of 2): Robin McBride and Andréa McBride John		October 19, 2020	
288	How I Built Resilience: Sonia Gil of Fluenz		October 22, 2020	
289	McBride Sisters Wine (Part 2 of 2): Robin McBride and Andréa McBride John		October 26, 2020	
290	How I Built Resilience: Cheryl Contee of Do Big Things		October 29, 2020	
291	How I Built Resilience: Justin Gold of Justin's		October 31, 2020	
292	Famous Dave's: Dave Anderson		November 2, 2020	
293	How I Built Resilience: Varshini Prakash of Sunrise Movement		November 5, 2020	
294	Dropbox: Drew Houston		November 9, 2020	
295	Kenneth Cole Productions: Kenneth Cole		November 16, 2020	
296	How I Built Resilience: Father Gregory Boyle of Homeboy Industries		November 19, 2020	
297	The Lip Bar: Melissa Butler		November 23, 2020	
298	How I Built Resilience: Dr. Iman Abuzeid of Incredible Health		November 25, 2020	
299	Remembering Tony Hsieh of Zappos*		November 30, 2020	January 23, 2017
300	Kodiak Cakes: Joel Clark		December 7, 2020	
301	How I Built Resilience: Emily Powell of Powell's Books		December 10, 2020	
302	Riot Games: Brandon Beck and Marc Merrill		December 14, 2020	
303	Riot Games: Bonus Episode		December 15, 2020	
304	How I Built Resilience: Daniela Corrente of Reel		December 17, 2020	
305	Author and Podcaster: Tim Ferriss		December 21, 2020	
306	How I Built Resilience: Morra Aarons-Mele of Women Online		December 22, 2020	
307	ActOne Group: Janice Bryant Howroyd (2018)*		December 28, 2020	December 3, 2018
308	Chipotle: Steve Ells (2017)*		January 4, 2021	October 30, 2017
309	Patreon: Jack Conte and Sam Yam		January 11, 2021	
310	Jazzercise: Judi Sheppard Missett		January 18, 2021	
311	How I Built Resilience: Elisa Villanueva Beard of Teach For America		January 21, 2021	
312	Seventh Generation: Alan Newman and Jeffrey Hollender		January 25, 2021	
313	How I Built Resilience: Loren and Lisa Poncia of Stemple Creek Ranch		January 28, 2021	
314	Norma Kamali: Norma Kamali		February 1, 2021	
315	How I Built Resilience: M. Night Shyamalan		February 4, 2021	
316	Atlassian: Mike Cannon-Brookes and Scott Farquhar		February 8, 2021	
317	How I Built Resilience: Michael Horvath and Mark Gainey of Strava		February 11, 2021	
318	Simple Mills: Katlin Smith		February 15, 2021	
319	How I Built Resilience: Beverly Leon of Local Civics		February 18, 2021	
320	Boxed: Chieh Huang		February 22, 2021	
321	How I Built Resilience: Troy Carter of Q&A (June 2020)*		February 25, 2021	June 6, 2020
322	Canva: Melanie Perkins (2019)*		March 1, 2021	January 28, 2019
323	How I Built Resilience: Alex Lieberman and Austin Rief of Morning Brew		March 4, 2021	
324	Rick Steves' Europe: Rick Steves		March 8, 2021	
325	How I Built Resilience: Shan-Lyn Ma of Zola		March 11, 2021	
326	Siete Family Foods: Miguel and Veronica Garza		March 15, 2021	
327	How I Built Resilience: Lisa Baird of National Women's Soccer League		March 18, 2021	
328	Hinge: Justin McLeod		March 22, 2021	
329	How I Built Resilience: Vivian Ku, Restaurateur		March 25, 2021	
330	UPPAbaby: Bob and Lauren Monahan		March 29, 2021	
331	How I Built Resilience: Kara Goldin of Hint		April 1, 2021	
332	Food52: Amanda Hesser		April 5, 2021	
333	How I Built Resilience: Ethan Diamond of Bandcamp		April 8, 2021	
334	Robinhood: Vlad Tenev		April 12, 2021	
335	How I Built Resilience: Lindsay Peoples Wagner of The Cut		April 15, 2021	
336	SoulCycle: Julie Rice and Elizabeth Cutler*		April 19, 2021	January 7, 2019
337	How I Built Resilience: Bayard Winthrop of American Giant		April 22, 2021	
338	Pipcorn: Jennifer and Jeff Martin		April 26, 2021	
339	Wellness Coach and Podcaster: Jay Shetty		April 29, 2021	
340	Eleven Madison Park: Daniel Humm		May 3, 2021	
341	Live Episode! Clubhouse: Paul Davison and Rohan Seth		May 6, 2021	
342	Cisco Systems and Urban Decay Cosmetics: Sandy Lerner (2018)*		May 10, 2021	October 1, 2018
343	Meet The HIBT Fellows: Pierre Paul and Toby Egbuna		May 11, 2021	
344	Meet The HIBT Fellows: Katie Mitchell and Celena Gill		May 13, 2021	
345	Diapers.com and Jet.com: Marc Lore		May 17, 2021	
346	Meet The HIBT Fellows: Mark Atlan and Zach Correa		May 18, 2021	
347	Meet The HIBT Fellows: Kaitlin McGreyes and Nicole Argüelles		May 20, 2021	
348	Policygenius: Jennifer Fitzgerald		May 24, 2021	
349	Meet The HIBT Fellows: Dinesh Tadepalli and Jennifer Zeitler		May 25, 2021	
350	JetBlue Airways: David Neeleman (2019)*		May 31, 2021	February 4, 2019
351	Jovial Foods: Carla Bartolucci		June 7, 2021	
352	Expedia and Zillow: Rich Barton		June 14, 2021	
353	ARRAY: Filmmaker Ava DuVernay		June 21, 2021	
354	Live From The HIBT Summit: Cynt Marshall, Chieh Huang, and Sadie Lincoln on Leadership		June 24, 2021	
355	Casper: Philip Krim		June 28, 2021	
356	Numi Organic Tea: Reem Hassani and Ahmed Rahim		July 5, 2021	
357	Mailchimp: Ben Chestnut		July 12, 2021	
358	Bobbi Brown Cosmetics: Bobbi Brown*		July 19, 2021	July 12, 2021
359	Live From HIBT Summit: Payal Kadakia, Tristan Walker, and Perry Chen on Innovation		July 22, 2021	
360	Robert Reffkin: Compass		July 26, 2021	
361	Serial Entrepreneur: Gary Vaynerchuk		August 2, 2021	
362	Live From The HIBT Summit: Gary Vaynerchuk		August 5, 2021	
363	Stacy's Pita Chips: Stacy Madison (2019)*		August 9, 2021	May 27, 2019
364	Live From The HIBT Summit: Brené Brown		August 12, 2021	
365	Logic: Logic and Chris Zarou (2018)*		August 16, 2021	March 11, 2019
366	Live From The HIBT Summit: Adam Grant		August 19, 2021	
367	Burt's Bees: Roxanne Quimby (2019)*		August 23, 2021	February 18, 2019
368	Live From The HIBT Summit: Rashad Robinson		August 26, 2021	
369	Springfree Trampoline: Keith Alexander and Steve Holmes (2019)*		August 30, 2021	April 1, 2019
370	Lynda.com: Lynda Weinman and Bruce Heavin		September 6, 2021	
371	inov-8: Wayne Edy		September 13, 2021	
372	Dude Perfect: Cory Cotton and Tyler Toney		September 20, 2021	
373	KAYAK: Paul English		September 27, 2021	
374	Uncle Nearest Premium Whiskey: Fawn Weaver		October 4, 2021	
375	Moderna and Flagship Pioneering: Noubar Afeyan		October 11, 2021	
376	Title Nine: Missy Park		October 18, 2021	
377	Live Episode! Milk Bar: Christina Tosi (2019)*		October 25, 2021	October 14, 2019
378	Wisdom From The Top: Bonus Episode		October 30, 2021	
379	Audible: Don Katz		November 1, 2021	
380	Back to the Roots: Nikhil Arora and Alejandro Velez		November 8, 2021	
381	Coinbase: Brian Armstrong		November 15, 2021	
382	Stasher and Modern Twist: Kat Nouri		November 22, 2021	
383	Live Episode! Tofurky: Seth Tibbott (2019)		November 29, 2021	
384	Merge Records: Laura Ballance and Mac McCaughan		December 6, 2021	
385	Planet: Will Marshall and Robbie Schingler		December 13, 2021	
386	Spin Master/PAW Patrol: Ronnen Harary		December 20, 2021	
387	Bonus Episode! Ask Guy Anything: December 2021		December 23, 2021	
388	Tate's Bake Shop: Kathleen King (2019)*		December 27, 2021	December 16, 2019
389	Bonus Episode! Wisdom From The Top: Best Buy		December 30, 2021	
390	Headspace: Andy Puddicombe and Rich Pierson (2019)*		January 3, 2022	September 23, 2019
391	M.M.LaFleur: Sarah LaFleur (2020)*		January 10, 2022	January 3, 2020
392	Discovery Channel and Curiosity Stream: John Hendricks		January 17, 2022	
393	Dang Foods: Vincent and Andrew Kitirattragarn		January 24, 2022	
394	Leatherman Tool Group: Tim Leatherman		January 31, 2022	
395	Goodreads: Otis and Elizabeth Chandler		February 7, 2022	
396	Telfar: Telfar Clemens and Babak Radboy		February 14, 2022	
397	Live Episode! Angie's BOOMCHICKAPOP: Angie and Dan Bastian (2019)*		February 21, 2022	July 29, 2019
398	Bonus Episode! The Limits with Jay Williams: Maverick Carter		February 24, 2022	
399	Live Episode! Walker and Company: Tristan Walker (2019)*		February 28, 2022	September 30, 2019
NA/395	Discord: Jason Citron		March 7, 2022	
NA/396	Sukhi's Gourmet Indian Food: Sukhi Singh and Dalbir Singh		March 14, 2022	
NA/397	WordPress and Automattic: Matt Mullenweg		March 21, 2022	
NA/398	Mitchell Gold + Bob Williams Home Furnishings: Mitchell Gold and Bob Williams		March 28, 2022	
NA/399	Bonobos: Andy Dunn (2019)*		April 4, 2022	January 21, 2019
NA/400	Florentine Films: Ken Burns		April 11, 2022	
NA/401	HIBT Lab! Colin and Samir: Colin Rosenblum and Samir Chaudry		April 14, 2022	
NA/402	Zola: Shan-Lyn Ma		April 18, 2022	
NA/403	HIBT Lab! WeWork: Miguel McKelvey		April 21, 2022	
NA/404	Raising Cane's: Todd Graves		April 25, 2022	
NA/405	HIBT Lab! Armbrust American: Lloyd Armbrust		April 28, 2022	
NA/406	Strava: Mark Gainey and Michael Horvath		May 2, 2022	
NA/407	HIBT Lab! Blogilates: Cassey Ho		May 5, 2022	
NA/408	PODS and Red Rover: Pete Warhurst		May 9, 2022	
NA/409	HIBT Lab! ClassPass: Payal Kadakia		May 12, 2022	
NA/410	HIBT Lab! UNLESS Collective: Eric Liedtke		May 16, 2022	
NA/411	HIBT Lab! Stolen Focus: Johann Hari		May 19, 2022	
NA/412	Nature's Path: Arran and Ratana Stephens		May 23, 2022	
NA/413	HIBT Lab! Burn Rate: Andy Dunn		May 26, 2022	
NA/414	Houzz: Adi Tatarko		May 30, 2022	
NA/415	HIBT Lab! Wildtype: Aryé Elfenbein and Justin Kolbeck		June 2, 2022	
NA/416	Pitchfork: Ryan Schreiber		June 6, 2022	
NA/417	HIBT Lab! Google: Sundar Pichai		June 9, 2022	
NA/418	PayPal: Max Levchin (Part 1 of 2)		June 13, 2022	
NA/419	HIBT Lab! Mark Cuban Cost Plus Drug Company: Mark Cuban		June 16, 2022	
NA/420	Affirm: Max Levchin (Part 2 of 2)		June 20, 2022	
NA/421	HIBT Lab! The Sorry Girls: Kelsey MacDermaid and Becky Wright		June 23, 2022	
NA/422	The Tonight Show and Electric Hot Dog: Jimmy Fallon		June 27, 2022	
NA/423	HIBT Lab! Climeworks: Jan Wurzbacher		June 30, 2022	
NA/424	Happy Family Organics: Shazi Visram (2020)*		July 4, 2022	January 20, 2020
NA/425	HIBT Lab! BlocPower: Donnel Baird		July 7, 2022	
NA/426	TaskRabbit: Leah Solivan		July 11, 2022	
NA/427	HIBT Lab! The Financial Diet: Chelsea Fagan		July 14, 2022	
NA/428	Twitch: Emmett Shear		July 18, 2022	
NA/429	ICYMI... HIBT Lab! Colin and Samir: Colin Rosenblum and Samir Chaudry		July 21, 2022	
NA/430	Tumi & Roam Luggage: Charlie Clifford		July 25, 2022	
NA/431	HIBT Lab! IDEO: David Kelley		July 28, 2022	
NA/432				
NA/433	Dogfish Head Craft Brewery: Sam and Mariah Calagione		August 1, 2022	
NA/434				
NA/435	HIBT Lab! Quaise Energy: Carlos Araque		August 4, 2022	
NA/436	Noom: Saeju Jeong		August 8, 2022	
NA/437	HIBT Lab! Universal Standard: Polina Veksler		August 11, 2022	
NA/438	Roblox: David Baszucki		August 15, 2022	
NA/439	HIBT Lab! Babish Culinary Universe: Andrew Rea		August 18, 2022	
NA/440	Jo Loves: Jo Malone CBE (2020)*		August 22, 2022	May 18, 2020
NA/441	HIBT Lab! Yolélé: Pierre Thiam		August 25, 2022	
NA/442	Men's Wearhouse: George Zimmer (2019)*		August 29, 2022	April 15, 2019
NA/443	HIBT Lab! Greg Solano and Wylie Aronow: Bored Ape Yacht Club		September 1, 2022	
NA/444	S'well: Sarah Kauss (2020)*		September 5, 2022	April 6, 2020
NA/445	HIBT Lab! Malala Fund and Our Place: Shiza Shahid		September 8, 2022	
NA/446	Rivian: RJ Scaringe		September 12, 2022	
NA/447	HIBT Lab! SOURCE Global: Cody Friesen		September 15, 2022	
NA/448	Bombas: David Heath and Randy Goldberg		September 19, 2022	
NA/449	HIBT Lab! Wonder: Marc Lore		September 22, 2022	
NA/450	HOORAE: Issa Rae		September 26, 2022	
NA/451	HIBT Lab! OpenAI: Sam Altman		September 29, 2022	
NA/452	ButcherBox: Mike Salguero		October 3, 2022	
NA/453	HIBT Lab! Against All Grain: Danielle Walker		October 6, 2022	
NA/454	Wirecutter: Brian Lam		October 10, 2022	
NA/455	ICYMI... HIBT Lab! Blogilates: Cassey Ho		October 13, 2022	
NA/456	Culver's: Craig Culver		October 17, 2022	
NA/457	HIBT Lab! Universal Hydrogen: Paul Eremenko		October 20, 2022	
NA/458	Bluemercury: Marla and Barry Beck		October 24, 2022	
NA/459	HIBT Lab! Cruise: Kyle Vogt		October 26, 2022	
NA/460	Tripadvisor: Steve Kaufer		October 31, 2022	
NA/461	HIBT Lab! MKBHD: Marques Brownlee		November 3, 2022	
NA/462	Ooni Pizza Ovens: Darina Garland and Kristian Tapaninaho		November 7, 2022	
NA/463	HIBT Lab! Tomorrow.io: Shimon Elkabetz		November 10, 2022	
NA/464	Chobani: Hamdi Ulukaya		November 14, 2022	
NA/465	HIBT Lab! Tala: Shivani Siroya		November 17, 2022	
NA/466	Roku: Anthony Wood		November 21, 2022	
NA/467	HIBT Lab! Goodr: Jasmine Crowe-Houston		November 24, 2022	
NA/468	Guayakí Yerba Mate: David Karr and Chris Mann		November 28, 2022	
NA/469	ICYMI... HIBT Lab! Babish Culinary Universe: Andrew Rea		December 1, 2022	
NA/470	Famous Dave's: Dave Anderson (2020)*		December 5, 2022	November 2, 2020
NA/471	HIBT Lab! Gro Intelligence: Sara Menker		December 8, 2022	
NA/472	Alienware: Frank Azor and Nelson Gonzalez		December 12, 2022	
NA/473	HIBT Lab! mitú and SUMA Wealth: Beatriz Acevedo		December 15, 2022	
NA/474	Beautyblender: Rea Ann Silva		December 19, 2022	
NA/475	HIBT Lab! Immunai: Noam Solomon		December 22, 2022	
NA/476	I.R.S. Records: Miles Copeland		December 26, 2022	
NA/477	ICYMI... HIBT Lab! The Sorry Girls: Kelsey MacDermaid and Becky Wright		December 29, 2022	
NA/478	Kodiak Cakes: Joel Clark (2020)*		Jan 2, 2023	December 7, 2020
NA/479	ICYMI... HIBT Lab! The Financial Diet: Chelsea Fagan		Jan 5, 2023	
NA/480	Health-Ade Kombucha: Daina Trout (2020)*		Jan 9, 2023	September 28, 2020
NA/481	ICYMI... HIBT Lab! Malala Fund and Our Place: Shiza Shahid		Jan 12, 2023	
NA/482	Complexly: Hank and John Green		Jan 16, 2023	
NA/483	HIBT Lab! Nuro: Dave Ferguson		Jan 19, 2023	
NA/484	Tarte Cosmetics: Maureen Kelly		Jan 23, 2023	
NA/485	HIBT Lab! Osmo Salt: Nick DiGiovanni		Jan 26, 2023	
NA/486	Chomps: Pete Maldonado and Rashid Ali		Jan 30, 2023	
NA/487	HIBT Lab! The Sioux Chef: Sean Sherman		Feb 2, 2023	
NA/488	Zumiez: Tom Campion		Feb 6, 2023	
NA/489	HIBT Lab! Biobot Analytics: Mariana Matus and Newsha Ghaeli		Feb 9, 2023	
NA/490	The Ringer: Bill Simmons		Feb 13, 2023	
NA/491	ICYMI... HIBT Lab! OpenAI: Sam Altman		Feb 16, 2023	
NA/492	Osprey Packs: Mike Pfotenhauer		Feb 20, 2023	
NA/493	HIBT Lab! Boom Supersonic: Blake Scholl		February 23, 2023	
NA/494	Politico & Axios: Jim VandeHei		February 27, 2023	
NA/495	HIBT Lab! The Confess Project: Lorenzo Lewis		March 2, 2023	
NA/496	Michael Kors: Michael Kors		March 6, 2023	
NA/497	HIBT Lab! Too Good To Go: Lucie Basch		March 9, 2023	
NA/498	Xero Shoes: Steven Sashen and Lena Phoenix		March 13, 2023	
NA/499	HIBT Lab! Saysh: Wes and Allyson Felix		March 16, 2023	
NA/500	Food52: Amanda Hesser (2021)*		March 20, 2023	April 5, 2021
NA/501	HIBT Lab! Slutty Vegan: Pinky Cole		March 23, 2023	
NA/502	Sun Bum: Tom Rinks		March 27, 2023	
NA/503	ICYMI... HIBT Lab! Climeworks: Jan Wurzbacher		March 30, 2023	
NA/504	Twilio: Jeff Lawson		April 3, 2023	
NA/505	HIBT Lab! Nas Company: Nuseir Yassin		April 6, 2023	
NA/506	Orangetheory Fitness: Ellen Latham		April 10, 2023	
NA/507	HIBT Lab! New Culture: Matt Gibson and Inja Radman		April 13, 2023	
NA/508	Halo Top Ice Cream: Justin Woolverton		April 17, 2023	
NA/509	HIBT Lab! Ursa Major: Joe Laurienti		April 20, 2023	
NA/510	Manduka: Peter Sterios		April 24, 2023	
NA/511	HIBT Lab! Hevesh5: Lily Hevesh		April 27, 2023	
NA/512	Suitsupply: Fokke de Jong		May 1, 2023	
NA/513	HIBT Lab! Babcock Ranch: Syd Kitson		May 4, 2023	
NA/514	Hinge: Justin McLeod (2021)*		May 8, 2023	March 22, 2021
NA/515	HIBT Lab! Landed: Alex Lofton		May 11, 2023	
NA/516	Mielle Organics: Monique Rodriguez		May 15, 2023	
NA/517	HIBT Lab! Cotopaxi: Davis Smith		May 18, 2023	
NA/518	Alamo Drafthouse Cinema: Tim and Karrie League		May 22, 2023	
NA/519	HIBT Lab! Google: Sundar Pichai (2022)*		May 25, 2023	June 9, 2022
NA/520	Chef and Restaurateur: Thomas Keller		May 29, 2023	
NA/521	Cultivating a creative community with Tina Roth-Eisenberg of CreativeMornings		June 1, 2023	
NA/522	Tory Burch: Tory Burch		June 5, 2023	
NA/523	Tapping the heat beneath your feet with Kathy Hannun of Dandelion Energy		June 8, 2023	
NA/524	Harry's Razors: Andy Katz-Mayfield and Jeff Raider		June 12, 2023	
NA/525	Saving the f#$%ing rainforests with Shara Ticku of C16 Biosciences		June 15, 2023	
NA/526	Spikeball: Chris Ruder		June 19, 2023	
NA/527	Reinvesting in our cities with renewable energy with Donnel Baird of BlocPower (2022)*		June 22, 2023	July 7, 2022
NA/528	Dutch Bros. Coffee: Travis Boersma		June 26, 2023	
NA/529	Reimagining seafood production with Aryé Elfenbein and Justin Kolbeck of Wildtype (2022)*		June 29, 2023	June 2, 2022
NA/530	The Lip Bar (TLB): Melissa Butler (2020)*		July 3, 2023	November 23, 2020
NA/531	When robots recycle with Matanya Horowitz of AMP Robotics		July 6, 2023	
NA/532	Mary's Gone Crackers: Mary Waldner		July 10, 2023	
NA/533	Delivering the future in drones with Keller Rinaudo Cliffton of Zipline		July 13, 2023	
NA/534	Grindr: Joel Simkhai		July 17, 2023	
NA/535	When trucks drive themselves with Chris Urmson of Aurora		July 20, 2023	
NA/536	MOD Pizza & Seattle Coffee Company: Scott and Ally Svenson		July 24, 2023	
NA/537	When AI is your personal tutor with Sal Khan of Khan Academy		July 27, 2023	
NA/538	The Tetris Company: Henk Rogers		July 31, 2023	
NA/539	Powering cars with solar energy with Steve Fambro of Aptera Motors		August 3, 2023	
NA/540	Orgain: Andrew Abraham		August 7, 2023	
NA/541	When our phones are just phones with Kai Tang and Joe Hollier of Light		August 10, 2023	
NA/542				
NA/543				
NA/544	Solo Stove: Spencer and Jeff Jan		August 14, 2023	
NA/545	Making garbage useful with Tom Szaky of TerraCycle		August 17, 2023	
NA/546	Kinko's: Paul Orfalea		August 21, 2023	
NA/547	Electrifying aviation with Kyle Clark of BETA Technologies		August 24, 2023	
NA/548	Supergoop!: Holly Thaggard (2020)*		August 28, 2023	June 8, 2020
NA/549	When your headphones listen to you with Ramses Alcaide of Neurable		August 31, 2023	
NA/550	Air Lease Corporation: Steven Udvar-Hazy		September 4, 2023	
NA/551	Threading the future of circular fashion with Peter Majeranowski of Circ		September 7, 2023	
NA/552	Jack Black Skin Care: Curran and Jeff Dandurand		September 11, 2023	
NA/553	Reclaiming food waste with Jasmine Crowe-Houston of Goodr (2022)*		September 13, 2023	November 24, 2022
NA/554	ARRAY: Filmmaker Ava DuVernay (2021)*		September 18, 2023	June 21, 2021
NA/555	A climate-resilient ancient grain with Pierre Thiam of Yolélé (2022)*		September 21, 2023	August 25, 2022
NA/556	Yasso: Amanda Klane and Drew Harrington		September 25, 2023	
NA/557	When your dinner is printed with Eshchar Ben-Shitrit of Redefine Meat		September 28, 2023	
NA/558	Vuori: Joe Kudla		October 2, 2023	
NA/559	A biometric smart gun with Kai Kloepfer of Biofire		October 5, 2023	
NA/560	Freshpet: Scott Morris		October 9, 2023	
NA/561	Unlocking the renewable energy revolution with Ramya Swaminathan of Malta Inc.		October 12, 2023	
NA/562	Herschel Supply Co.: Jamie and Lyndon Cormack		October 16, 2023	
NA/563	Leading through radical change with Julia Hartz of Eventbrite		October 19, 2023	
NA/564	Sir Kensington's: Scott Norton and Mark Ramadan		October 23, 2023	
NA/565	Love's next chapter with Whitney Wolfe Herd of Bumble		October 26, 2023	
NA/566	Etsy: Rob Kalin		October 30, 2023	
NA/567	The art of letting go with Vincent and Andrew Kitirattragarn of Dang Foods		November 2, 2023	
NA/568	Kona Ice: Tony Lamb		November 5, 2023	
NA/569	When a robot cooks your lunch with Steve Ells of Chipotle and Kernel		November 9, 2023	
NA/570	Priority Bicycles: Dave Weiner		November 12, 2023	
NA/571	Literally unearthing a climate solution with Cody Finke of Brimstone		November 16, 2023	
NA/572	Everlane: Michael Preysman		November 20, 2023	
NA/573	The future of driving is autonomous with Dmitri Dolgov of Waymo		November 23, 2023	
NA/574	CAVA: Ted Xenohristos and Brett Schulman		November 27, 2023	
NA/575	The surprise that's saving food with Lucie Basch of Too Good To Go (2023)*		November 30, 2023	March 9, 2023
NA/576	Briogeo Hair Care: Nancy Twine (2020)*		December 4, 2023	August 10, 2020
NA/577	Full body preventive health care with Andrew Lacy of Prenuvo		December 7, 2023	
NA/578	Wondery: Hernan Lopez		December 11, 2023	
NA/579	Framing the future of eyecare with Neil Blumenthal and Dave Gilboa of Warby Parker		December 14, 2023	
NA/580	reCAPTCHA and Duolingo: Luis von Ahn (2020)*		December 18, 2023	May 25, 2020
NA/581	Shooting for the moon with Steve Altemus of Intuitive Machines		December 21, 2023	
NA/582	KiwiCo: Sandra Oh Lin		December 25, 2023	
NA/583	Charging up the electric vehicle market with RJ Scaringe of Rivian		December 28, 2023	
NA/584	Aviator Nation: Paige Mycoskie		January 1, 2024	
NA/585	Sharing the 2023 HIBT Lab Highlight Reel		January 4, 2024	
NA/586	Calendly: Tope Awotona (2020)*		January 8, 2024	September 14, 2020
NA/587	Designing shoes for women's feet with Wes and Allyson Felix of Saysh (2023)*		January 11, 2024	March 16, 2023
NA/588	Primary: Christina Carbonell and Galyn Bernard		January 15, 2024	
NA/589	Doing the bees' work with Thai Sade of BloomX		January 18, 2024	
NA/590	Liquid Death: Mike Cessario		January 22, 2024	
NA/591	Brewing creativity with Jim Koch of Boston Beer Company		January 25, 2024	
NA/592	Drunk Elephant: Tiffany Masterson		January 29, 2024	
NA/593	3D printing a housing revolution with Jason Ballard of ICON		February 1, 2024	
NA/594	Parachute Home: Ariel Kaye		February 5, 2024	
NA/595	Building a decarbonization army with Shashank Samala of Heirloom		February 8, 2024	
NA/596	Magic Spoon & Exo: Gabi Lewis and Greg Sewitz		February 12, 2024	
NA/597	Powering cars with solar energy with Steve Fambro of Aptera Motors (2023)*		February 15, 2024	August 3, 2023
NA/598	Sonos: John MacFarlane		February 19, 2024	
NA/599	The peril (and promise) of AI with Tristan Harris: Part 1		February 22, 2024	
NA/600	Poshmark: Manish Chandra		February 26, 2024	
NA/601	The peril (and promise) of AI with Tristan Harris: Part 2		February 29, 2024	
NA/602	Uncle Nearest Premium Whiskey: Fawn Weaver (2021)*		March 4, 2024	October 4, 2021
NA/603	Supercharging Lithium-Ion Batteries with Gene Berdichevsky of Sila Nanotechnologies		March 7, 2024	
NA/604	Primal Kitchen: Mark Sisson		March 11, 2024	
NA/605	AI that can be your second brain with Bethany Bongiorno and Imran Chaudhri of Humane		March 14, 2024	
NA/606	Weee!: Larry Liu		March 18, 2024	
NA/607	Achieving greater things with Adam Grant		March 21, 2024	
NA/608	MGA Entertainment: Isaac Larian		March 25, 2024	
NA/609	"Beaming" people anywhere in the world with David Nussbaum of Proto		March 28, 2024	
NA/610	Whole30: Melissa Urban		April 1, 2024	
NA/611	Less competition, more creation with Renée Mauborgne		April 4, 2024	
NA/612	Mythical: Rhett and Link		April 8, 2024	
NA/613	AI is smarter than you think with Shane Legg of Google DeepMind		April 11, 2024	
NA/614	CrunchLabs: Mark Rober		April 15, 2024	
NA/615	Healing through food with Danielle Walker of Against All Grain (2022)*		April 18, 2024	October 6, 2022
NA/616	YouTube Creator and Cookbook Author: Rosanna Pansino		April 22, 2024	
NA/617	Advice Line with Fawn Weaver of Uncle Nearest Premium Whiskey		April 25, 2024	
NA/618	Dhar Mann Studios: Dhar Mann		April 29, 2024	
NA/619	Advice Line with Pete Maldonado of Chomps		May 2, 2024	
NA/620	Twitter, Medium and Blogger: Ev Williams		May 6, 2024	
NA/621	Advice Line with Gary Erickson of Clif Bar		May 9, 2024	
NA/622	nutpods: Madeline Haydon		May 13, 2024	
NA/623	Advice Line with Andrew Abraham of Orgain		May 16, 2024	
NA/624	Therabody: Jason Wersland		May 20, 2024	
NA/625	Advice Line with Tom Rinks of Sun Bum		May 23, 2024	
NA/626	Concept2 Rowing Machines: Dick and Peter Dreissigacker		May 27, 2024	
NA/627	Advice Line with Maureen Kelly of Tarte Cosmetics		May 30, 2024	
NA/628	ECKO UNLTD and COMPLEX: Marc Ecko		June3, 2024	
NA/629	Advice Line with Fawn Weaver of Uncle Nearest Premium Whiskey (2024)*		June6, 2024	April 25, 2024
NA/630	Dave’s Hot Chicken: Arman Oganesyan		June 10, 2024	
NA/631	Advice Line with Randy Goldberg of Bombas		June 13, 2024	
NA/632	The Cronut and Dominique Ansel Bakery: Dominique Ansel		June 17, 2024	
NA/633	Advice Line with Sarah Kauss of S'well		June 20, 2024	
NA/634	Spin Master/PAW Patrol: Ronnen Harary (2021)*		June 24, 2024	December 20, 2021
NA/635	Advice Line with Mark Ramadan of Sir Kensington's		June 27, 2024	
NA/636	American Giant: Bayard Winthrop		July 1, 2024	
NA/637	Advice Line with Brett Schulman of CAVA		July 4, 2024	
NA/638	Ouidad hair products: Ouidad Wise		July 8, 2024	
NA/639	Advice Line with Tony Lamb of Kona Ice		July 11, 2024	
NA/640	KAYAK: Paul English (2021)		July 15, 2024	September 27, 2021
NA/641	Advice Line with Pete Maldonado of Chomps (2024)*		July 18, 2024	May 2, 2024
NA/642	On athletic shoes: Olivier Bernhard and Caspar Coppetti		July 22, 2024	
NA/643	Advice Line with Joe Kudla of Vuori		July 25, 2024	
NA/644	BONUS: Brand Building Live at Cannes Lions		July 26, 2024	
NA/645	Specialized Bicycle Components: Mike Sinyard		July 29, 2024	
NA/646	Advice Line with Jeff Raider of Harry's		August 1, 2024	
NA/647	SmartSweets: Tara Bosch		August 5, 2024	
NA/648	Advice Line with Jim Koch of Boston Beer Company		August 8, 2024	
NA/649	Thrive Market: Nick Green		August 12, 2024	
NA/650	Advice Line with Holly Thaggard of Supergoop!		August 15, 2024	
NA/651	Banana Republic: Mel and Patricia Ziegler		August 19, 2024	
NA/652	Advice Line with Jamie Siminoff of Ring		August 22, 2024	
NA/653	Insomnia Cookies: Seth Berkowitz		August 26, 2024	
NA/654	Advice Line with Ariel Kaye of Parachute Home		August 29, 2024	
NA/655	Olipop: Ben Goodwin		September 2, 2024	
NA/656	Advice Line with Scott and Ally Svenson of MOD Pizza		September 5, 2024	
NA/657	Groupon and Descript: Andrew Mason		September 9, 2024	
NA/658	Advice Line with Leah Solivan of Taskrabbit		September 12, 2024	
NA/659	Barefoot Wine: Bonnie Harvey and Michael Houlihan		September 16, 2024	
NA/660	Advice Line with Sadie Lincoln of barre3		September 19, 2024	
NA/661	Graduate Hotels: Ben Weprin		September 23, 2024	
NA/662	Advice Line with Vicky Tsai of Tatcha		September 26, 2024	
NA/663	Lily’s Sweets: Cynthia Tice		September 30, 2024	
NA/664	Advice Line: Reaching New Customers		October 3, 2024	
NA/665	Paperless Post: James and Alexa Hirschfeld		October 7, 2024	
NA/666	Advice Line: Growing Beyond Your Niche		October 10, 2024	
NA/667	Viator: Rod Cuthbert		October 14, 2024	
NA/668	Advice Line with Lara Merriken of LÄRABAR		October 17, 2024	
NA/669 October	21 Seeds: Kat Hantas		October 21, 2024	
NA/670	Advice Line with Michael Preysman of Everlane		October 24, 2024	
NA/671	What It Really Takes To Build a Food Business: Part 1		October 18, 2024	
NA/672	Black Diamond Equipment: Peter Metcalf		October 28, 2024	
NA/673	Advice Line with Angie Hicks of Angi		October 31, 2024	
NA/674	What It Really Takes To Build a Food Business: Part 2		October 25, 2024	
NA/675	BARK: Matt Meeker		Nov 4, 2024	
NA/676	Advice Line with Brian Scudamore of 1-800-GOT-JUNK?		Nov 7, 2024	
NA/677	Boll & Branch: Scott and Missy Tannen		Nov 10, 2024	
NA/678	Advice Line with Gary Hirshberg of Stonyfield		Nov 14, 2024	
NA/679	Athletic Brewing Company: Bill Shufelt		Nov 18, 2024	
NA/680	Advice Line with Chris Ruder of Spikeball		Nov 21, 2024	
NA/681	Noosa Yoghurt: Koel Thomae		Nov 25, 2024	
NA/682	Advice Line with Norma Kamali of Norma Kamali		Nov 28, 2024	
NA/683	Dude Perfect: Cory Cotton and Tyler Toney (2021)*		Dec 2, 2024	September 20, 2021
NA/684	Advice Line with Gary Erickson of Clif Bar (May 2024)*		Dec 5, 2024	May 9, 2024
NA/685	Norma Kamali: Norma Kamali (2021)*		Dec 9, 2024	February 1, 2021
NA/686	Advice Line with Jane Wurwand of Dermalogica		Dec 12, 2024	
NA/687	Marucci Sports - Kurt Ainsworth		Dec 16, 2024	
NA/688	Advice Line with Steve Case of AOL		Dec 19, 2024	
NA/689	The Container Store: Kip and Sharon Tindell		Dec 23, 2024	
NA/690	Advice Line with Serial Entrepreneur Marc Lore		Dec 26, 2024	
NA/691	Hero Cosmetics: Ju Rhyu and Dwight Lee		Dec 30, 2024	
NA/692	Advice Line with Brett Schulman of CAVA (July 2024)*		Jan 2, 2025	July 4, 2024
NA/693	Raising Cane's: Todd Graves (2022)*		Jan 6, 2025	April 25, 2022
NA/694	Advice Line with Lara Merriken of LÄRABAR*		Jan 9, 2024	October 17, 2024
NA/695	Bombas: David Heath and Randy Goldberg*		Jan 13, 2024	September 19, 2022
NA/696	Advice Line with Jack Conte of Patreon		Jan 16, 2024	
NA/697	Resy and Eater: Ben Leventhal		Jan 20, 2024	
NA/698	Advice Line with Katlin Smith of Simple Mills		Jan 23, 2024	
NA/699	Fanatics: Michael Rubin		Jan 27, 2024	
NA/700	Advice Line with Joe Gebbia of Airbnb		Jan 30, 2024	
E701	Dogfish Head Craft Brewery: Sam and Mariah Calagione (2022)*		February 3, 2025	August 1, 2022
E702	Advice Line with Vicky Tsai of Tatcha (September 2024)*		February 6, 2025	September 26, 2024
E703	Beyond Yoga: Michelle Wahler		February 10, 2025	
E704	Advice Line with Travis Boersma of Dutch Bros		February 13, 2025	
E705	Mrs. Meyer's Clean Day: Monica Nassif		February 17, 2025	
E706	Advice Line with Ariel Kaye of Parachute Home (August 2024)*		February 20, 2025	August 29, 2024
E707	Lenny & Larry’s Protein Snacks: Barry Turner		February 24, 2025	
E708	Advice Line with Lyndon Cormack of Herschel Supply Co.		February 27, 2025	
E709	PayPal: Max Levchin (June 2022)*		March 3, 2025	June 13, 2022
E710	Advice Line with Alberto Perlman of Zumba		March 6, 2025	
E711	SpotHero: Mark Lawrence		March 10, 2025	
E712	Advice Line with Jenn Hyman of Rent The Runway		March 13, 2025	
E713	Skype and Kazaa: Niklas Zennström		March 17, 2025	
E714	Advice Line with Leah Solivan of Taskrabbit (September 2024)*		March 20, 2025	September 12, 2024
E715	Dr. Dennis Gross Skincare: Dennis and Carrie Gross		March 24, 2025	
E716	Advice Line with Jeni Britton of Jeni's Splendid Ice Creams		March 27, 2025	
E717	Misfits Market: Abhi Ramesh		March 31, 2025	
E718	Advice Line with Jeff and Curran Dandurand of Jack Black Skin Care		April 3, 2025	
E719	Title Nine: Missy Park (October 2021)*		April 7, 2025	October 18, 2021
E720	Advice Line with Peter Rahal of RXBAR		April 10, 2025	
E721	Vizio: William Wang		April 14, 2025	
E722	Advice Line with Andy Dunn of Bonobos		April 17, 2025	
E723	Snap: Evan Spiegel		April 21, 2025	
E724	Advice Line with Jonathan Neman of Sweetgreen		April 24, 2025	
E725	Hexclad: Danny Winer		April 28, 2025	
E726	Advice Line with Luis von Ahn of Duolingo		May 1, 2025	
E727	Whisker/Litter-Robot: Brad Baxter		May 5, 2025	
E728	Advice Line with Richard Branson of Virgin		May 8, 2025	
E729	Substack: Chris Best and Hamish McKenzie		May 12, 2025	
E730	Advice Line with RJ Scaringe with Rivian		May 14, 2025	
E731	Tecovas: Paul Hedrick		May 19, 2025	
E732	Advice Line: Scaling Strategies		May 22, 2025	
E733	Calm: Alex Tew and Michael Acton Smith		May 26, 2025	
E734	Advice Line with Steve Holmes of goba Sports Group		May 29, 2025	
E735	Tatcha: Vicky Tsai (July 2020)*		June 2, 2025	July 13, 2020
E736	Advice Line with Mark Ramadan of Sir Kensington's (June 2024)*		June 5, 2025	June 27, 2024
E737	Perfect Snacks: Bill and Leigh Keith		June 9, 2025	
E738	Advice Line with Perry Chen of Kickstarter		June 12, 2025	
E739	Figma: Dylan Field		June 16, 2025	
E740	Advice Line with Marcia Kilgore of Beauty Pie		June 19, 2025	
E741	UNTUCKit: Chris Riccobono		June 23, 2025	
E742	Advice Line with Eric Ryan of Method		June 26, 2025	
E743	Talenti: Josh Hochschuler		June 30, 2025	
E744	Advice Line with Jim Koch of Boston Beer Company (August 2024)*		July 3, 2025	August 8, 2024
E745	Rick Steves' Europe: Rick Steves (2021)*		July 7, 2025	March 8, 2021
E746	Advice Line with Norma Kamali of Norma Kamali (2024)*		July 10, 2025	November 28, 2024
E747	Chobani: Hamdi Ulukaya (2022)*		July 14, 2025	November 14, 2022
E748	Advice Line with Justin McLeod of Hinge		July 17, 2025	
E749	WHOOP: Will Ahmed		July 21, 2025	
E750	Advice Line with Troy Carter of Atom Factory		July 24, 2025	
E751	Torchy's Tacos: Mike Rypka		July 28, 2025	
E752	Advice Line with Isaac Larian of MGA Entertainment		July 31, 2025	
E753	Simon Cowell: Music Mogul		August 4, 2025	
E754	Advice Line with Mei Xu of Chesapeake Bay Candle and Blueme		August 7, 2025	
E755	Crumbl: Jason McGowan		August 11, 2025	
E756	Advice Line with Jamie Siminoff of Ring (August 2024)*		August 21, 2025	August 22, 2024
E757	Madison Reed: Amy Errett		August 18, 2025	
E758	Exclusive Update: The Chef Who Shocked the Culinary World and Why He’s Changing Course Again—Daniel Humm of Eleven Madison Park		August 13, 2025	
E759	(July 2021) Ben Chestnut: From Side Business to $12 Billion – The Accidental Triumph of Mailchimp*		August 25, 2025	July 12, 2021
E760	Advice Line with Tim Ferriss		August 28, 2025	
E761	Don Vultaggio: AriZona Beverage Company - The Snap Decision That Outsmarted Snapple		September 1, 2025	
E762	Advice Line: Playing to Your Strengths		September 4, 2025	
E763	Carlton Calvin: Razor. The wild rise, collapse, and reinvention of a mobile toy empire.		September 8, 2025	
E764	Advice Line with Dave Weiner of Priority Bicycles		September 11, 2025	
E765	Nirav Tolia: Nextdoor. How neighborhood chatter went global		September 15, 2025	
E766	Advice Line with Bobbi Brown of Jones Road Beauty		September 18, 2025	
E767	Poppi: Allison and Stephen Ellsworth. From Farmers Market Vinegar Drink to $2B Soda Sensation		September 22, 2025	
E768	Advice Line with Randy Hetrick of TRX		September 25, 2025	
E769	Craigslist: Craig Newmark — The Forrest Gump of the Internet		September 29, 2025	
E770	Advice Line with Tony Xu of Doordash		October 2, 2025	
E771	Pressbox and Tide Cleaners: Vijen Patel. The $1.99 Gamble That Built a National Brand		October 6, 2025	
E772	Advice Line with Michael Dubin of Dollar Shave Club		October 9, 2025	
E773	Faherty Brand: Alex and Mike Faherty. How Jersey Shore + Manhattan Chic grew to 80 stores.		October 13, 2025	
E774	Advice Line with Stacy Madison of Stacy’s Pita Chips		October 16, 2025	
E775	Magnolia: Chip & Joanna Gaines. From House Flipping to Household Name		October 20, 2025	
E776	Advice Line with John Zimmer of Lyft		October 23, 2025	
E777	Nuts.com: Jeff Braverman. From Corner Store to Snacktime Powerhouse		October 27, 2025	
E778	Advice Line with Niraj Shah of Wayfair		October 30, 2025	
E779	Babylist: Natalie Gordon. How a new mom used nap time to build a $500M business.		November 3, 2025	
E780	Advice Line with Tariq Farid of Edible Arrangements		November 6, 2025	
E781	Backroads: Tom Hale. How a desk worker became a trailblazer in active travel		November 9, 2025	
E782	Advice Line with Chet Pipkin of Belkin International		November 13, 2025	
E783	Gymshark: Ben Francis. From pizza delivery to billion-dollar fitness brand.		November 17, 2025	
E784	Advice Line with Anthony Casalena of Squarespace		November 20, 2025	
E785	Hydro Flask: Travis Rosbach. How a thirsty surfer changed the water bottle industry		November 24, 2025	
E786	Advice Line with Bill Creelman of Spindrift		November 27, 2025	
E787	Meridith Baer Home: Meridith Baer. She Started Over at 50 and Put Home Staging on the Map.		December 1, 2025	
E788	Advice Line with Jane Wurwand of Dermalogica (2024)*		December 3, 2025	December 12, 2024
E789	Khan Academy: Sal Khan. From Tutoring His Cousins to Teaching the World For Free (September 2020)*		December 8, 2025	September 21, 2020
E790	Advice Line with Scott Tannen of Boll & Branch and Jamie Siminoff of Ring		December 11, 2025	
E791	93 Rejections, One Revolution: How Indiegogo Changed Crowdfunding Forever		December 15, 2025	
E792	Advice Line with Bobby Trussell of Tempur-Pedic		December 18, 2025	
E793	Exploding Kittens: Elan Lee. How cat-themed Russian Roulette changed game night forever		December 22, 2025	
E794	Advice Line with Todd Graves of Raising Cane's		December 25, 2025	
*Rerun Source:
