= Donnel =

Donnel is a given name. Notable people with the name include:

- Donnel Baird (born 1981), American climate entrepreneur and political organizer
- Byron Donnel Beamss (1935–1992), American footballer
- Henry Donnel Foster (1808–1880), American lawyer and politician
- Donnel Foster Hewett (1881–1971), American geologist and mineralogist
- Donnel Pumphrey (born 1994), American college football coach and former player
- Khalid Donnel Robinson (born 1998), known as Khalid, American singer and songwriter
- Donnel Thompson (born 1978), American former professional football player
