= Sarah LaFleur =

Sarah LaFleur may refer to:

- Sarah Lafleur, Canadian actress
- Sarah Miyazawa LaFleur, businesswoman and fashion designer
