= Keith Alexander (engineer) =

New Zealand inventor

- Born: Keith Vivian Alexander

Academic background
- Education: University of Canterbury
- Thesis: The lifting paddlewheel: a non-buoyant wheel enabling a high speed wheeled amphibious craft to run on the water surface (1983)

Academic work
- Discipline: Mechanical engineering
- Institutions: University of Canterbury
- Notable ideas: Waterjet design, new trampoline design
- Website: University profile

Keith Vivian Alexander is a New Zealand mechanical engineer and inventor. He is a professor of mechanical engineering at the University of Canterbury, in Christchurch, and the inventor of the springfree trampoline.

Alexander began his professional life as a primary school teacher. After 4 years of teaching he returned to university to complete a degree in engineering, conducting research on an invention of his own to gain his PhD.

Post graduation, Alexander worked for an engineering consultancy for a period of 6 years, in which time he led a team in developing advanced heavy presses for the New Zealand wool industry. Following this, Alexander moved to CWF Hamilton, a New Zealand company which pioneered the jet boat, where he worked on a number of projects including waterjet development which resulted in patented innovations. 1996 saw Alexander take up a position at the University of Canterbury where he still teaches mechanical engineering design & product innovation.

Since 1999 he and some of his students have been involved in the development of the Martin Jetpack. In 2003 he became involved in the development of Alan Gibbs' Aquada amphibious car.

Whilst at the university he has been responsible for several patented inventions including the springfree trampoline. The trampoline won the 2010 Consumer Product of the Year Award in the United States following earlier awards in Australia, Canada and New Zealand. In the same year Alexander was awarded the New Zealand Engineering Innovator of the Year award by the New Zealand Engineering Excellence Awards.

In 2018 Alexander was a member of the ASTM Standards Committee on trampolines.
