= Ochoyan =

Japanese television drama series

- Original title: おちょやん
- Genre: Drama
- Written by: Hiroyuki Yatsu
- Directed by: Yoshiro Nagisawa; Makoto Bonkobara
- Starring: Hana Sugisaki; Ryo Narita; Jun Nagura; Hidetoshi Hoshida; Yōko Ishino; Keiko Miyata; Emma Miyazawa; Tadashi Nishikawa; Ayaka Higashino; Ai Yoshikawa; Junko Abe; Ryuya Wakaba; Tengai Shibuya; Mayumi Wakamura; Haruka Igawa; Tortoise Matsumoto; Nakamura Ganjirō IV; Ryoko Shinohara
- Narrated by: Kichiya Katsura
- Opening theme: "Nakiwarai no Episode" by Motohiro Hata
- Composer: Hajime Sakita
- Country of origin: Japan
- Original language: Japanese
- No. of episodes: 115

Production
- Executive producers: Shōichi Sakurai; Ritsuji Kumano
- Producer: Shunpei Murayama
- Running time: 15 minutes
- Production company: NHK Osaka

Original release
- Network: NHK
- Release: November 30, 2020 – May 15, 2021

Ochoyan (おちょやん) is a Japanese television drama series and the 103rd Asadora series, following Yell. It premiered on November 30, 2020 and concluded on May 15, 2021. It is based on the life of Chieko Naniwa.

== Plot ==
Chiyo Takei (Hana Sugisaki) was born to a poor family in Osaka Prefecture’s Minamikawachi district in the Meiji era. Her mother died when she was still a child, and she lived with her father Teruo and younger brother. Although Chiyo could not be put through elementary school, she has the gift of the gab and quick wit. At the age of 9, she starts working as a servant in Dotonbori and comes across the theatre world which immediately captivates her. Chiyo’s desire to become an actress grows stronger by the day. She eventually runs away and heads to Kyoto where she throws herself into acting.

== Cast ==
=== Takei's family ===
- Hana Sugisaki as Chiyo Takei
  - Nono Maida as young Chiyo
- Tortoise Matsumoto as Teruo Takei, Chiyo's father
- Emma Miyazawa as Kuriko Takei, Chiyo's step-mother
- Yūki Kura as Yoshiro Takei, Chiyo's younger brother
  - Hinata Aruta as young Yoshio

=== Dotonbori people ===
- Ryoko Shinohara as Shizu Okada, a landlady of Okayasu theater
- Jun Nagura as Sōsuke Okada, Shizu's husband
- Ayaka Higashino as Mitsue Okada, Shizu and Sōsuke's only daughter
  - Yumi Kishida as young Mitsue
- Keiko Miyata as Hana Okada, Shizu's mother
- Yōko Ishino as Kiku Tomikawa, a landlady of Fukutomi theater
- Hideaki Okajima as Fukumatsu Tomikawa, Kiku's husband
- Takuya Inoue as Fukusuke Tomikawa, Kiku and Fukumatsu's only son
  - Kazuma Matsumoto as young Fukusuke
- Kaoru Kusumi as Kame
- Shiori Doi as Fujiko
- Sawa Nimura as Setsuko
- Chisa Furuya as Tama
- Masumi Tange as Tsubaki
- Ren Sawaki as Hodan
- Kurumi Fujimoto as Ayame

=== Comedy people ===
- Ryo Narita as Ippei Amami, Chiyo's husband
  - Tōma Nakasu as young Ippei
- Motohiko Shigeyama as Tenkai Amami, Ippei's father
- Hidetoshi Hoshida as Sennosuke Suganoya
- Itsuji Itao as Mantarō Suganoya
- Tadashi Nishikawa as Kumada
- Haru Konishi as Tōko Asahina

=== Kamigata theater people ===
- Nakamura Ganjirō IV as Ōyama Tsuruzō
- Haruka Igawa as Yuriko Takashiro, an actress
- Mayumi Wakamura as Chidori Yamamura
- Rio Asumi as Ruriko Takamine
- Kantarō Soganoya as Masanori Oyamada
- Eiji Kochō as Appare Suganoya
- Noriyuki Otsuka as Tokkuri Suganoya
- Ryotaro Okawa as Yōjirō Urushibara
- Kiyo Matsumoto as Kaori Ishida
- Ryutarō Sakaguchi as Hyakkuri Suganoya

=== People from Kyoto ===
- Kazuhiko Nishimura as Kiyoshi Miyamoto, an owner of Kinema cafe
- Ai Yoshikawa as Mari Uno, a Kinema female employee
- Junko Abe as Yōko Wakasaki, an aspiring actress
- Kurara Emi as Kiyoko Yabuuchi, a member of "Chidori Yamamura Ichiza"

=== People in movie theater ===
- Ryuya Wakaba as Shinji Kogure, an assistant director
- Seiji Rokkaku as Heihachi Katagane, the chief of Tsurukame studio
- Shibuya Tengai III as Moriya, a security guard
- Jun'ya Kawashima as George Honda, a director
- First Summer Uika as Mika Honda, an actress
- Akari Kizuki as Yayoi Tōyama, an actress

=== People from Kawachi ===
- Koichi Kurokawa as Tatsuo Kobayashi
- Yoshikazu Kiuchi as Mr. Tamai
- Mitsuo Sagawa as Minegishi, president of a glass factory

=== Others ===
- Muga Tsukaji as Ataro Hanaguruma
- Ōshirō Maeda as Kanji Matsushima
- Kichiya Katsura as Kurogo (also as narrator)

== Production ==
The filming began on April 2, 2020, but on April 7, NHK decided the suspension of shooting for the new series after Prime Minister Shinzo Abe proclaimed a one-month state of emergency for Tokyo and other prefectures. The shooting was resumed on June 24. Since then, it has been recorded in accordance with NHK "Drama Production Manual for Preventing New Coronavirus Infection", and although the recording schedule has been significantly delayed, it has not considered changing the script or shortening the broadcasting period. The series announced that it will premiered on November 30, after previously being delayed from original on September 28 due to the pandemic.

Preceded by Yell	Asadora; November 30, 2020 – May 15, 2021	Succeeded by Okaeri Mone
