= Emma Miyazawa =

Japanese tarento and actress

- 宮澤 エマ
- Born: 23 November 1988 (age 37); Tokyo, Japan
- Other name: Emma Miyazawa LaFleur (former stage name)
- Occupation: Tarento
- Years active: 2012–present
- Agent: Production Ogi
- Father: Christopher La Fleur
- Relatives: Heichi Ogawa (high-grandfather); Yutaka Miyazawa (great-grandfather); Kiichi Miyazawa (maternal grandfather)

Emma Miyazawa (宮澤 エマ, Miyazawa Ema; born 23 November 1988, in Tokyo, Japan) is a Japanese television personality and actress. Her former stage name is Emma Miyazawa La Fleur (ラフルアー宮澤エマ, Ra Furuā Miyazawa Ema).

== Family ==
She is the daughter of Christopher J. LaFleur, the former United States Ambassador to Malaysia, and Keiko Miyazawa LaFleur, the daughter of Kiichi Miyazawa, who served as Prime Minister of Japan from 1991 to 1993. Her older sister is Sarah Miyazawa LaFleur.

== Filmography ==
=== TV programmes ===
Year	Title	Network	Notes	Ref.
2016	Sono Genin, X ni ari!	Fuji TV	Quasi-regular appearances	

=== Musicals ===
Year	Title	Role	Ref.
2013	Merrily We Roll Along	Mary Flynn	
2014	Sister Act	Sister Mary Robert	
2014	Bare		
2015	Shock	Rika	
2015	Man of La Mancha	Antonia	
2015	Dogfight	Rose	
2017	A Gentleman's Guide to Love and Murder	Phoebe	

=== Film ===
Year	Title	Role	Notes	Ref.
2019	Hit Me Anyone One More Time	Jet Wada		
2024	All About Suomi	Azami		
2025	Kokuho	Matsu Tachibana		
2025	Tokyo MER: Mobile Emergency Room – Nankai Mission	Miyuki Take		
2025	Hey, Dazai: The Movie	Miyoko Komuro		
2026	Tokyo MER: Mobile Emergency Room – Capital Crisis	Miyuki Take		

=== Television drama ===
Year	Title	Role	Notes	Ref.
2020–21	Ochoyan	Kuriko Takei	Asadora	
2022	The 13 Lords of the Shogun	Lady Awa	Taiga drama	
2022	Umeko: The Face of Female Education	Yoshimasu Ryō	Television film	
2023	Ranman	Mie Kasazaki	Asadora	
2023	Fermat's Cuisine	Nene Fukuda		
2025	Hey, Dazai	Miyoko Komuro	Television film	
2026	Brothers in Arms	Tomo	Taiga drama	

== Awards and nominations ==
Year	Award	Category	Work(s)	Result	Ref.
2024	31st Yomiuri Theater Awards	Best Actress	Rabbit Hole	Nominated	

== See also ==
- May J., Miyazawa's classmate at Morimura Gakuen
