= Spindrift Beverage Co. =

American beverage company

Spindrift
- Type: Private
- Industry: Beverage
- Founded: 2010; 16 years ago in Waltham, Massachusetts, United States
- Founder: Bill Creelman
- Products: Sparkling Water
- Number of employees: 105
- Website: drinkspindrift.com

Spindrift is an American sparkling water and soda company. Spindrift uses fruit juice to flavor its products.

== Background ==
The company was founded in 2010 by Bill Creelman, who said he named it Spindrift after the term for the whitewash of a wave, or windblown surf.

Spindrift is currently available in twenty-two flavors:

- Blueberry Lemonade
- Cherry
- Ginger Lime Mule
- Yuzu Mandarin
- Tropical Lemonade
- Cosnopolitan (Cosmopolitan Mocktail)
- Fuji Apple
- Grapeade
- Island Punch (Passion Fruit Orange Guava)
- Nojito (Lime & Mint)
- Berry Belli-no (Peach Strawberry)
- Raspberry Lime
- Grapefruit
- Blood Orange Tangerine
- Half Tea & Half Lemon (now sold only on Amazon per Spindrift support)
- Mango Orange
- Lime
- Lemon
- Pineapple
- Pink Lemonade
- Lemon Limeade
- Strawberry Lemonade

Spindrift also offers seasonal beverages. The current seasonal beverages offered include Cranberry Raspberry and Cranberry Punch.

== History ==
In 2010, Bill Creelman started Spindrift in Charlestown, Massachusetts with a line of sodas. The beverages boasted real squeezed fruit sweetened with cane sugar. The first flavors released were grapefruit, orange, mango, lemonade, and blackberry. This was soon followed by a cranberry raspberry flavor and a half & half flavor in 2011. In 2012, Spindrift started selling seltzer in lemon, raspberry lime, and tangerine flavors. In 2014, raspberry lime became the first flavor of seltzer to be sold in a can as opposed to a bottle. Additionally, ginger beer was a new flavor joining the soda line. On June 4, 2014, Spindrift expanded its company's staff from four to eight people.

In 2016, Spindrift discontinued its entire soda line of beverages in favor of the seltzer line. A new can design was used, and seltzer was rebranded to be called sparkling water. In 2017, Spindrift debuted "Tall Boys", a 16oz tall variety of the existing cans of sparkling water. Only certain flavors of sparkling water had a tall boy variant. On May 3, 2017, Spindrift closed on $10 million of new growth capital led by VMG Partners.

On February 28, 2018, Spindrift announced new distribution of its products in Kroger, Starbucks, and Whole Foods. On March 20, 2018, Spindrift secured $20 million in funding from VMG Partners. On June 14, 2018, Spindrift reported experiencing an 800% sales increase from 2016 to 2018. During March 2020, Spindrift raised $29.8 million in funding from Moelis & Company LLC.

As of November 2020, Spindrift has 105 employees and $69.9 million in total funding. In 2021, Spindrift released a new line of alcoholic sparkling water, Spindrift Spiked. Available flavors of spindrift spiked was mango, half & half, lime, and pineapple. Lemon, grapefruit, passion orange guava, blood orange tangerine, spiced apple cider, and strawberry lemonade soon followed.

In 2024, Spindrift started an online video series called, "Squeezed: A True Crime Podumockery," in which a fictional quest is depicted in order to reveal a new flavor of sparkling water. Four episodes were made airing each Friday in February 2024. During the final episode, aired February 23, 2024, two new flavors of sparkling water were announced, Grapeade and Island Punch. On August 19, 2024, Spindrift announced a new flavor of sparkling water, fuji apple, along with the return of cranberry raspberry, on their Instagram. Another new flavor, Cosnopolitan, was announced on Instagram on December 16, 2024.

== Flavors ==
As of 2024 there are 32 existing flavors of Spindrift sparkling water. Over a dozen are currently available in retail locations while the remaining are vaulted, meaning they are currently unavailable for purchase. Additionally, there is a line of spiked Spindrift available. Before selling sparkling water, Spindrift sold a line of soda which was discontinued in 2016. It resumed in 2025, but with different flavors and no added sugar.

=== Sparkling Water ===
- Lemon
- Grapefruit
- Raspberry Lime (2014)
- Cucumber (2015, Vaulted)
- Watermelon (2016, Vaulted)
- Blackberry (2016, Vaulted, limited re-release in 2024)
- Mango Orange (2017)
- Strawberry (2017, Vaulted)
- Cranberry Raspberry (2018)
- Half Tea & Half Lemon (2018)
- Lime (2019)
- Pineapple (2020)
- Lemon Limeade (2021)
- Pink Lemonade (2021)
- Strawberry Lemonade (2021)
- Blood Orange Tangerine (2022)
- Spiced Apple Cider (2022, Vaulted)
- Mango Black Tea (2023)
- Mint Green Tea (2023)
- Nojito, a non-alcoholic mojito flavor (2023)
- Peach Strawberry (2023)
- Grapeade (2024)
- Island Punch (2024)
- Fuji Apple (2024)
- Cosnopolitan (2024)
- Tropical Lemonade (2025)
- Yuzu Mandarin (2025)
- Cranberry Punch (2025)
- Cherry (2026)
- Ginger Lime Mule (2026)

=== Spiked ===
- Mango (2021)
- Half & Half (2021, Vaulted)
- Lime (2021)
- Pineapple (2021)
- Lemon (2022)
- Blood Orange Tangerine (2022)
- Passion Orange Guava (2022)
- Grapefruit (2022)
- Spiced Apple Cider (2022, Vaulted)
- Strawberry Lemonade (2023)

=== Soda ===
- Half & Half, half lemonade half tea flavor (Vaulted)
- Ginger Beer (Vaulted)
- Cranberry Raspberry (Vaulted)
- Lemonade (Vaulted)
- Grapefruit (Vaulted)
- Blackberry (Vaulted)
- Orange Mango (Vaulted)
- Concord Grape (2025)
- Ginger Ale (2025)
- Orange Cream Float (2025)
- Strawberry Shortcake (2025)
- Shirley Temple (2025)
