= Springfree Trampoline =

Sports equipment manufacturer

Springfree Trampoline is a company that manufactures recreational trampoline products and accessories. The design was created by Keith Vivian Alexander, a professor in the Mechanical Engineering Department at the University of Canterbury in Christchurch, New Zealand. Springfree Trampolines are sold globally in over 31 countries.

== History ==
In 1989, Dr. Keith Alexander began developing a safer trampoline after his daughter expressed interest in owning one and his wife raised concerns about their safety. After analysing trampoline data in 1992, Alexander noted three impact zones affecting jumper safety in the George Nissen trampoline design. These were:

1. The springs – on the jumping surface.
2. The steel frame – on the jumping surface/ jumpers may fall and injure themselves.
3. The ground or obstructions on the ground – jumpers would hit as a result of falling off.

Alexander's goal was to increase the trampoline's safety by re-engineering the spring technology. Alexander spent more than a decade developing a trampoline that mitigated these common impact zones. This included several versions, one being an inflatable trampoline with a mat stretched over the top. By the late 1990s, he produced a prototype using stretching fibreglass rods instead of springs. In 1999, Alexander released his first prototype utilising glass-reinforced plastic rods, and the first commercial versions began selling in late 2004. In 2009, Springfree Trampoline won an Australian Design Award.

Canadian entrepreneur Steve Holmes acquired the rights to Alexander’s design in the early 2000s, aiming to commercialize it globally. He secured Costco Canada as an early retailer, followed by U.S. distribution after a successful factory audit in 2008.[3] Holmes expanded production capacity to maintain quality and supply, selling nearly 500,000 during the 2021 pandemic surge.

== Design ==
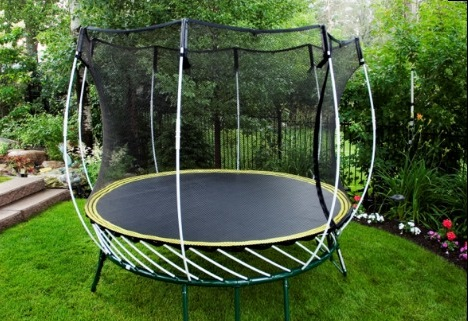
Alternative Springfree trampoline

The Springfree trampoline's design includes the use of glass-reinforced plastic rods articulating below the jumping surface, as opposed to the radiating steel spring coils of a Nissen trampoline. The jumping surface is lowered around 450mm below the jumping surface of a traditional trampoline, and the base's rigidity is derived from a tubular steel assembly with angled supports.
