= Jeni's Splendid Ice Creams =

American ice cream company

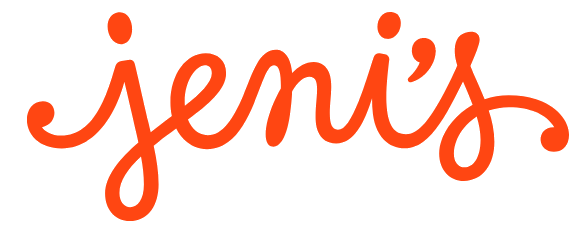
- Industry: Food service
- Founded: 2002; 24 years ago Columbus, Ohio, U.S.
- Founder: Jeni Britton-Bauer
- Headquarters: Columbus, Ohio, U.S.
- Number of locations: 101
- Area served: Regional for some products and national for others
- Key people: David Stever (CEO)
- Products: Ice cream and novelties
- Website: jenis.com

Jeni's Splendid Ice Creams is an ice cream company headquartered in Columbus, Ohio. Jeni's has over 80 ice cream shops and retail distributors in the United States.

== History ==
Jeni's Splendid Ice Creams was founded by Jeni Britton-Bauer, who is the current chief creative officer.

Before starting Jeni's Splendid Ice Creams, Britton-Bauer attended The Ohio State University and studied art history and fine art. While in college, she was given vials of scented chemicals by a chemistry graduate colleague, which led her to gather essential oils, make her own perfume, and sell her perfumes for a few years.

Bauer experimented with the essential oil of cayenne pepper and combined it with chocolate ice cream to make spicy frozen chocolate. She determined that ice cream was "the perfect carrier of scent," and thus began making other flavors of ice cream with essential oils. Two weeks later, she decided that she wanted to make scented ice cream as a business and dropped out of Ohio State.

Bauer first sold her ice cream at a farmer's market in Columbus, Ohio. Later on in 1996, Britton-Bauer opened her first storefront in the North Market area of Columbus, dubbed Scream Ice Creams. Britton-Bauer worked there for several years while further developing flavors. Some of the first few flavors were Salty Caramel, Wildberry Lavender, and Queen City Cayenne. After four years, Britton-Bauer closed Scream and attended the ice cream short course at Penn State.

The first Jeni's Splendid Ice Creams opened in 2002, also in the North Market. This establishment offered a wider variety of serving options than Scream, which provided customers one flavor at a time. Within the first year, the brother of her then-boyfriend (now husband) Charly joined the company, making him the second member of the company.

In 2006, Bauer opened her first store outside of North Market and continued to expand into other locations in the area. In 2009, John Lowe was appointed as the company's first CEO.

As of November 2022, the company has 1,800 employees.

== Operations ==
As of June 2025, "Scoop Shops" are located in fifteen states and the District of Columbia. Jeni's Splendid Ice Creams pints are also distributed in over 3,000 high-end groceries and markets nationwide, as well as through online ordering. In 2021, the company brought in $95.7 million.

== Products ==
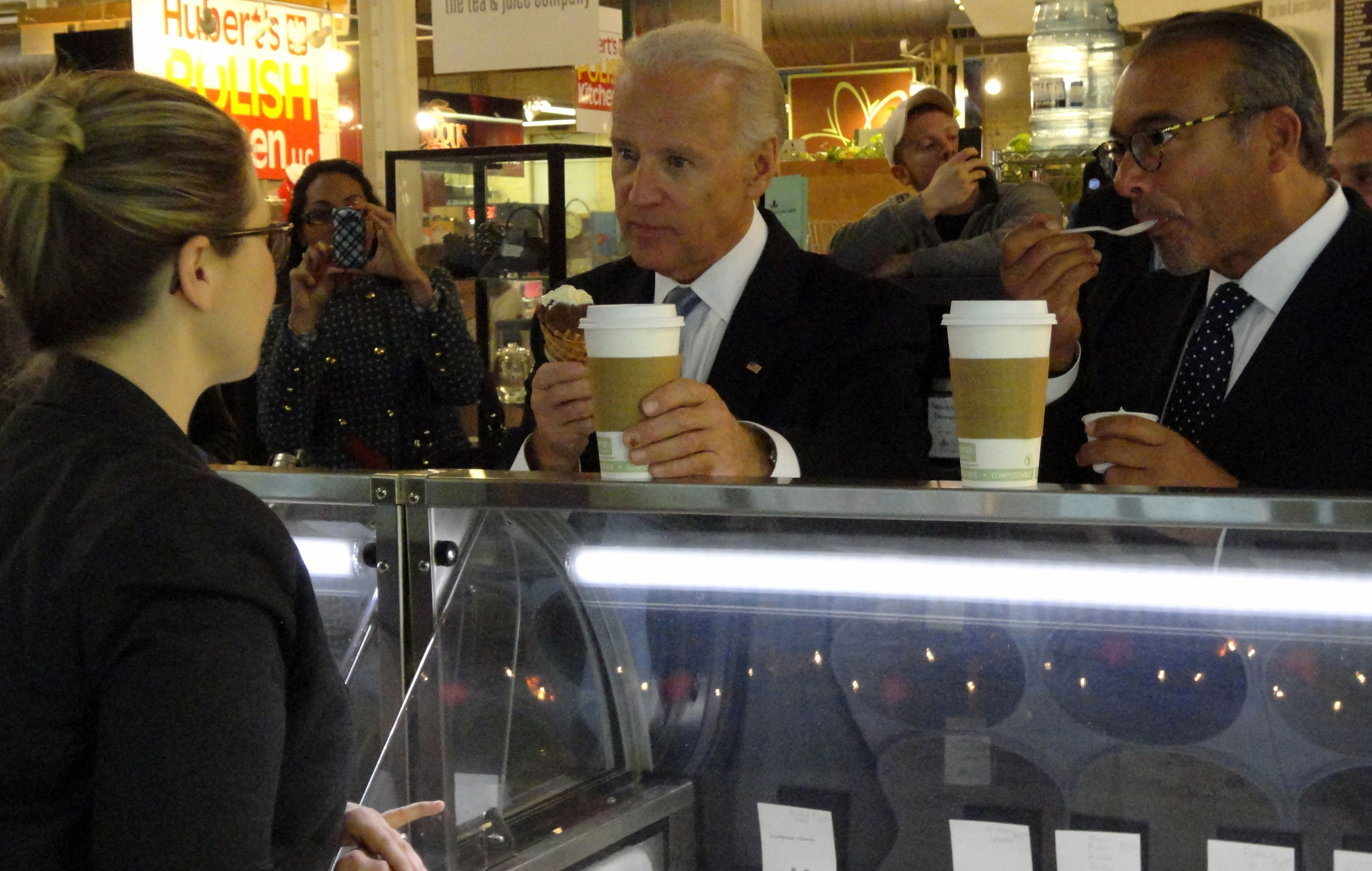
Former president Joe Biden and Columbus Mayor Michael Coleman getting ice cream at Jeni's Splendid Ice Creams in North Market in 2012. Founder Britton-Bauer is behind the counter.

As of August 2022, Jeni's had 37 ice cream flavors on their menu, with new and changing flavors based on seasonality and partnerships.

In 2021, Jeni's released a limited-edition flavor in honor of former President Joe Biden's inauguration. Biden visted Jeni's in Columbus while Vice President and considers it a favorite.

== Partnerships ==
Jeni's partnered with Uncle Nearest Premium Whiskey in 2022 for the non-alcoholic 'Boozy Eggnog' flavor. They partnered again in December 2023 for a 'Hot Toddy' sorbet flavor, which was released in January 2024. Jeni's also partnered with American jam rock band Goose in June of 2025 for the Goose Tracks flavor.

== Recalls ==
On April 23, 2015, Jeni's initiated a recall due to the possible presence of Listeria in their retail pint ice cream. The contamination originated with a retail product filling machine in Jeni's Ohio facility. Jeni's initiated a second Listeria-related recall in June 2015, connected to the first recall. There was another recall in June 2024, when its ice-cream sandwiches potentially contained Listeria—the company outsourced its ice cream sandwiches to Totally Cool, an ice cream manufacturer. The company took steps to address the Listeria including recalling products, disinfecting their manufacturing facilities, and retraining their employees. Jonathan Bernstein, a Los Angeles-based crisis management consultant, told Food Safety News that the company's initial response to the first positive Listeria test was "technically perfect." "They said we don't know if anybody's gotten sick, but we're recalling everything, and they did it quick. In terms of response, they did the best possible thing they could do."

== Reviews ==
Jeni's received a positive review on the "Hot and Spicy" episode of Food Network's show The Best Thing I Ever Ate (2010). It was reviewed in The Washington Post (2011), The Huffington Post (2012), and U.S. News & World Report, who ranked it #1 in America in 2012. The Chicago Tribune (2011) said "Jeni's Splendid Ice Creams is gaining a national reputation for producing superior desserts made of milk sourced from a family farm in Ohio's Appalachian region." Time magazine said it "has a large cult following among Ohio émigrés and ice cream geeks."

The Atlantic positively reviewed it saying "Jeni's flavors are not successful simply because they are irreverent and ground-breaking. They work because a great deal of effort has gone into their crafting—what at first glance seems whimsical, upon first bite is proven artisanal." It has also been positively reviewed in The New York Times (2011), and by Today (2012). In 2007, The New York Times said Jeni's had "surpassed the creativity of all other ice cream makers with its versions like goat cheese and Cognac fig sauce."

== Awards ==
In 2012, Jeni's received a Sofi Gold Award in the "Dessert or Dessert Topping" category for Lemon Frozen Yogurt. In 2013, Jeni's won another Sofi Gold Award in the "Outstanding Product Line" category. Beginning with her early days at Scream and continuing to the present, Britton-Bauer's ice cream has incorporated products local to Columbus and Ohio, including milk, fruit, and whiskey.

Fast Company named Jeni Britton-Bauer one of the Most Creative People in Business in 2018. In 2019, Inc. listed Jeni's as #2329 on its Inc. 5000 list.

Britton-Bauer received an honorary doctorate in business administration from Ohio State, the university she had attended but left in her sophomore year to pursue a career in ice cream, after serving as the commencement speaker at the summer 2016 graduation.

== Cookbooks ==
In 2011, Jeni Britton-Bauer published her first cookbook, Jeni's Splendid Ice Creams at Home, which became a New York Times best-seller; and The Wall Street Journal called it the "homemade-ice cream-making Bible." Britton-Bauer won a James Beard Foundation Award for the cookbook. The book was also nominated for the Goodreads Choice Awards Best Food & Cookbooks that year.

Britton-Bauer published Jeni's Splendid Ice Cream Desserts in 2014 "to provide an audience with the tools to craft their own ice cream-based creations".

In March 2019, Britton-Bauer published her third cookbook, The Artisanal Kitchen: Perfect Homemade Ice Cream: The Best Make-It Yourself Ice Creams, Sorbets, Sundaes, and Other Desserts.
