= UPPAbaby =

American baby product company

- Founded: 2006; 20 years ago
- Founder: Lauren & Bob Monahan
- Headquarters: Hingham, Massachusetts, United States
- Area served: Worldwide
- Key people: Bob Monahan, CEO
- Products: Baby products
- Website: uppababy.com

UPPAbaby is an American company that designs and manufactures baby strollers, car seats and related accessories. The company was founded in 2006 and is based in Hingham, Massachusetts.

== Products ==
The company's first product was the Vista stroller, positioned as a mid-priced option between mass market brands and expensive imports. Key features of their strollers include one-handed recline, adjustable handlebar heights, and large storage baskets. The aluminum frames are designed for a balance of weight and sturdiness.

== History ==
After launching in the U.S. and Canada in 2006, UPPAbaby expanded distribution to over 40 countries by 2015. Celebrity parents were photographed using UPPAbaby strollers, helping increase brand awareness. As of 2022, UPPAbaby has over 175 employees globally and sells products in more than 50 countries. The company remains privately held with co-founder Bob Monahan as CEO.

In October 2023, it was reported that the company is exploring a sale.

=== Recalls ===
In June 2021, UPPAbaby has recalled about 86,000 adapters included with the RumbleSeats due to child fall hazard.

In January 2022, after receiving at least one report of a child losing part of a finger, the company has recalled more than 14,000 jogging strollers due to the risk of finger amputation.
