= Monique Rodriguez =

American entrepreneur and the founder of Mielle Organics

- Born: Chicago, Illinois, US
- Occupations: Entrepreneur, CEO, philanthropist
- Known for: Founder of Mielle Organics

Monique Rodriguez is an American entrepreneur and the founder of Mielle Organics, a hair care and beauty brand.

== Early life and education ==
Monique Rodriguez was raised in Chicago, Illinois. She developed an interest in hair care at an early age, influenced by her mother's homemade hair treatments. Rodriguez pursued a career in nursing.

== Career ==
Rodriguez founded Mielle Organics in 2014. The company offers products designed specifically for textured hair, including shampoos, conditioners, oils, and styling products.

In January 2023, Rodriguez announced the sale of Mielle Organics to Procter & Gamble (P&G).

== Philanthropic work ==
Rodriguez launched a venture fund in 2023, to provide financial and mentorship support to minority-owned businesses in the beauty and wellness industries.

== Personal life ==
Rodriguez said in 2019 that a family tragedy motivated her to pursue a career in hair care full-time.

== Awards and recognition ==
Rodriguez was recognized as one of CNBC's "Changemakers" in 2024 for her impact on the beauty industry and her efforts to support Black women entrepreneurs
