= Life Is Good Company =

American company

Coordinates: 42°20′57.1″N 71°5′4.8″W

- Type: Private
- Founded: 1994; 32 years ago
- Founder: Bert Jacobs; John Jacobs
- Headquarters: Boston, Massachusetts, U.S.
- Number of employees: 200+
- Website: www.lifeisgood.com

The Life Is Good Company is an American apparel and accessories wholesaler, retailer, and lifestyle brand founded in 1994 and notable for its optimistic T-shirts and hats, many of which feature a smiling stick figure named Jake and the registered trademark "Life is good."

== History ==
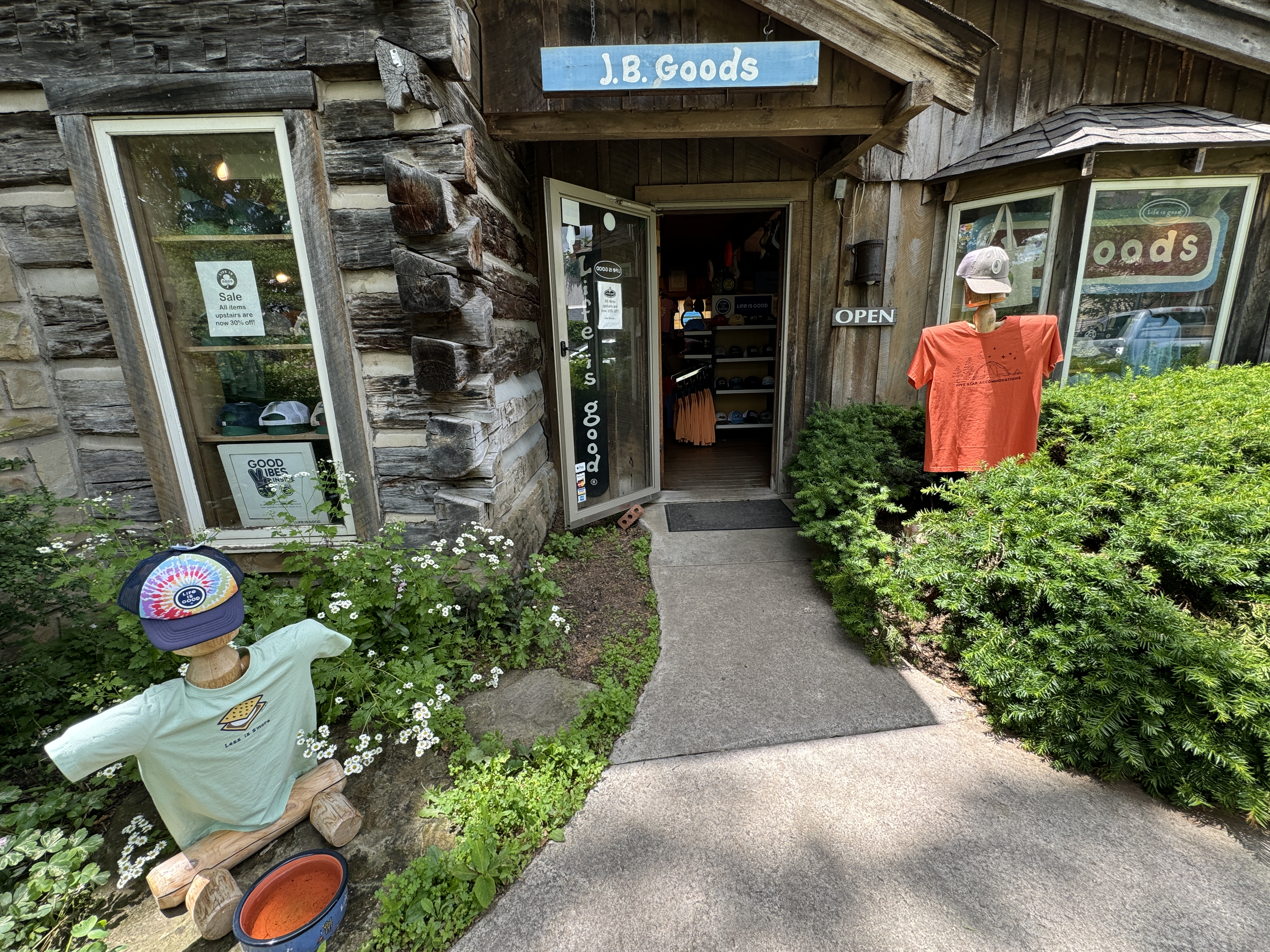
A Life is Good branded store in Nashville, Indiana in 2024.

In 1989, brothers Bert and John Jacobs, who grew up in Needham, Massachusetts, designed their first T-shirts. They began selling their designs in the streets of Boston and out of an old van at colleges and street fairs along the East Coast of the United States. In 1994, following a not-so-successful road trip, they returned to Boston, unsure of the future of their business. It was their common practice to gather friends at their apartment following such trips to share stories and to ask their friends to comment on drawings and sayings posted on their living room walls. On this occasion, one drawing received considerable favorable attention from their friends — the head of a beret-wearing, smiling stick figure and the phrase "Life is good." The brothers named the character Jake and printed up 48 shirts bearing a smiling Jake and the words "Life is good." At a street fair in Cambridge, Massachusetts, the shirts sold out in less than an hour. The brothers began to sell T-shirts and hats featuring Jake in local stores. Sales grew quickly and they hit the $100 million sales mark by 2007.

Life is Good corporate logo, 2011–2015

Life is Good expanded its product lines from T-shirts and caps in the early years to a full line of apparel for men, women, and children, as well as an increasing number of accessories categories. They offer over 900 different items. Products are sold online via the company's website, in approximately 4,500 retail stores in the United States, and in 30 countries. Life is Good donates 10% of its profits to their Life is Good Kids Foundation.

Life is Good corporate logo, 1994–2011

== Sources ==
- Bergeson, Laine (March 2011). "The Good Life". Experience L!fe Magazine.
- Bert Jacobs, John Jacobs, Steve Gross, Jim Laughlin (2011-05-02). The Boss: Bert and John Jacobs, Life is good. Boston: NECN.
- "Life is good at Fitchburg State". Fitchburg State. 2008-07-16.
- "Life is good: Words of Wisdom from the Brothers Behind the T-Shirts". WholeLiving.com/Body+Soul Magazine. December 2009.
- Rifkin, Glenn (2007-11-22). "Millions in Sales From 3 Simple Words". New York Times.
- Shallard, Sheri (May 2008). "Grand Profile: Life is good. "Optimists Only"" (PDF). WSA Magazine/sportstextiles.com.
- "Sports, Leadership & Life >> John Jacobs". WEEI Sports Radio Network. 2009-08-15. Archived from the original on 2011-07-13.
- Soong, Jennifer (December 2004). "the sunshine boys" (PDF). Worthwhile Magazine.
