= Stacy's Pita Chips =

Snack product brand

Stacy's Pita Chip Company
- Industry: Food Industry
- Founded: 1998; 28 years ago
- Founder: Stacy Madison; Mark Andrus
- Parent: PepsiCo

Stacy's Pita Chips is an American brand of snack products based in Randolph, Massachusetts, specializing in various flavors of pita chips. Pita chips are slices of pita bread which are baked until crunchy. They are commonly eaten as a snack and come in a variety of flavors including Simply Naked (flavored only with sea salt), Cinnamon Sugar, and Garlic Parmesan among others. Stacy's also makes other crunchy snacks such as Pita Thins, Cheese Petites, and Bagel Chips.

Stacy's Pita Chips was founded by Stacy Madison and Mark Andrus in 1996, originally giving the pita chips away for free at their food cart to keep customers happy while waiting in line. In 2006, Stacy's Pita Chips reached US$65 million in revenue and was sold to PepsiCo where it now operates under the Frito-Lay division.

== History ==
=== Stacy's D'Lites ===
In 1996, Stacy Madison and Mark Andrus began selling pita bread sandwiches out of their food cart, called Stacy's D'Lites, in Boston, Massachusetts. Due to the popularity of the sandwiches, Stacy and Mark would over-order pita bread from a local bakery. Rather than wasting the extra bread, they sliced the pita into chips, seasoned them with cinnamon sugar or Parmesan, and baked the bread until it became crunchy. The chips were distributed for free while customers waited for their sandwiches to be made.

=== Stacy's Pita Chips ===
As the popularity of the pita chips grew, Stacy and Mark began selling the chips alongside their sandwiches. In the winter, the harsh weather made the food cart inoperable. Stacy and Mark decided to fully transition to selling pita chips, an operation they could continue year-round, and chose the name Stacy's Pita Chips because they believed a woman's name would appeal more to customers.

=== Growth ===
From 1997 to 1999, Stacy and Mark gave out samples of their chips in local grocery stores. They purchased a custom conveyor belt oven in 1999 which allowed for explosive growth and wholesale purchases. The business reached $1 million in sales in 2001 and $65 million in sales in 2005.

=== Acquisition ===
In 2005, Stacy and Mark were approached with multiple acquisition offers from large snack food companies in the United States. They agreed to a $243 million sale to PepsiCo and would operate under their Frito-Lay snack food division. Although Pepsi Co. was not the highest bidder for the business, Stacy and Mark believed Pepsi's operations and culture fit best with Stacy's Pita Chips.

=== Complications ===
While scaling the business, Stacy and Mark married in 1997. Personal differences led to their divorce in 2001, however the divorce was amicable and Stacy and Mark agreed to split the business 50/50.

In 2005, while Stacy and Mark were fielding offers for their business, the pita chip factory suffered a fire that affected 25% of the factory. A wall was built to separate the unaffected areas and the factory was able to maintain the majority of its operations. Within a few weeks, the factory was fully repaired and the deal with Pepsi was able to close.

== Products ==
Stacy's Pita Chips offers five product lines: Stacy's Pita Chips, Stacy's Pita Thins, Stacy's Cheese Petites, Stacy's Bagel Chips, and Stacy's Organic Pita Chips.

=== Stacy's Pita Chips ===
Stacy's Pita Chips are the original product under the Stacy product line. They are made by slicing pita bread into small pieces and baking them until they become crunchy. As of 2019, flavors include: Simply Naked (sea salt), Parmesan Garlic & Herb, Cinnamon Sugar, Fire Roasted Jalapeño, Multigrain, Toasted Cheddar, and Garden Veggie Medley. As of 2020, the product has changed to facilitate mass manufacturing. The character, flavor, sizes, shapes and textures of the original Stacy’s Pita Chips have been modified.

=== Stacy's Pita Thins ===
Stacy's Pita Thins are thinner versions of the original chips and come in three flavors: Simply Naked, 5 Cheese, and Garlic & Herbs.

=== Stacy's Bagel Chips ===
Stacy's Bagel Chips are made by slicing bagels into small, thin pieces and baking them until they become crunchy. Currently, there are three flavors of Stacy's Bagel Chips: Simply Naked, Everything, and Toasted Garlic.

=== Stacy's Cheese Petites ===
Stacy's Cheese Petites are thin slices of cheese which are flavored and baked until crispy. Flavors include Romano With Garlic and Parmesan With Rosemary.

=== Stacy's Organic Pita Chips ===
Stacy's Organic Pita Chips are Non-GMO Project Certified and are free of artificial colors, flavors, or MSG. They come in Simply Naked flavor and Rosemary Garlic flavor.

== Nutrition facts ==
Stacy's Pita Chips, Pita Thins, and Organic Pita Chips contain 190 calories per serving (about 10 chips), as well as 5 grams of fat, 9 grams of carbohydrates and 3 grams of protein. Stacy's Cheese Petites have 150 calories, 8 grams of fat, 11 grams of carbohydrates, and 6 grams of protein per serving. Stacy's Bagel Chips contain 130 calories, 4 grams of fat, 19 grams of carbohydrates, and 4 grams of protein per serving.

== Recalls ==
In February 2019, 228 bags of Stacy's Simply Naked Pita Chips were recalled after a manufacturing error resulted in the addition of an ingredient that caused allergic reactions to people with dairy-related allergies due to undeclared milk.

== Rise Project ==
Stacy's Rise Project helps women entrepreneurs find mentors, consultants, advising networks, and financial support. The project hope to empower women to start and grow their food-focused businesses and offers cash prizes to the project's finalists. As of 2019, Stacy's has committed over $300,000 to the project.

== About Stacy Madison ==
Stacy Madison grew up in Boston before moving to California to obtain a master's degree in Social Work. After spending some time in Washington D.C. working in underprivileged communities, she joined then-boyfriend and future business partner Mark Andrus in moving to Hawaii. Stacy and Mark founded Stacy's Pita Chips in 1996 upon returning to Boston and married in 1997, but the couple divorced in 2001. Stacy started a family in 2003 after having twins. Around the time of the Frito-Lay acquisition of Stacy's Pita Chips, Stacy was diagnosed with breast cancer and an auto-immune disease. She has since recovered and went on to launch several other successful food ventures, including Stacy's Juice Bar and Be Bold bars. Stacy served on the board of Evolution Fresh prior to its acquisition by Starbucks while working at private equity firm Fireman Capital Partners. She still maintains her role as a consultant at Fireman Capital Partners as she continues to raise her family and grow her other ventures in Massachusetts.
