= Vicky Tsai =

American business executive

- Born: Victoria Tsai; 1977 or 1978 (age 47–48)
- Education: Wellesley College (BA); Harvard Business School (MBA)
- Occupation: Business executive
- Known for: Founder of Tatcha
- Children: 1

Victoria "Vicky" Tsai (born 1977 or 1978) is an American business executive and the founder of Tatcha, a skincare company. She founded the company in 2009 and served as its chief executive until 2018; Tatcha was acquired by Unilever in 2019 for a reported US$500 million. Tsai returned as chief executive in January 2021 and stepped back later that year after a new chief executive was appointed.

== Early life and education ==
Tsai was born in 1977 or 1978. Her parents had emigrated from Taiwan to Texas. She grew up in Texas, moving to Houston as a teenager; her mother ran a beauty store selling Western skincare brands.

She received a Bachelor of Arts in economics from Wellesley College and a Master of Business Administration from Harvard Business School in 2006.

== Career ==
=== Early career ===
After college, Tsai moved to New York and worked on Wall Street. After business school, Tsai joined Starbucks, where she took part in a store-level immersion program in Shanghai before working on the company's consumer products launch in China, which included bottled Frappuccino ahead of the 2008 Summer Olympics. In 2008 she left a startup job and traveled to Japan.

=== Tatcha ===
Tsai founded Tatcha in 2009, after a trip to Kyoto where she was introduced to traditional Japanese skincare practices. The company's first product was oil-blotting paper sourced from a Japanese manufacturer, and the brand expanded into a full skincare line by 2012. Tsai has said she funded the company's early operations by selling her engagement ring, car and furniture, and that she did not draw a salary for most of the company's first decade, during which her husband was the family's sole earner. She has said that prospective retail partners initially described the brand as "too niche" and "too exotic" for the US market.

Tatcha's revenue reached about $12 million in 2014, and the company ranked 21st on the 2015 Inc. 5000 list of fast-growing private companies. Private equity firm Castanea Partners invested in the company in 2017. In 2018, Tsai stepped down as chief executive and was succeeded by Jean-Marc Plisson, formerly of Shiseido; she later said the change had been requested by the company's investors.

In June 2019, Unilever announced it had acquired Tatcha. Terms were not disclosed, but the price was widely reported at about $500 million. Tsai returned as chief executive in January 2021 following Plisson's departure, and led a search for a permanent successor. Mary Yee was appointed chief executive in October 2021, with Tsai continuing to work on product development and brand strategy. Yee left the company in October 2025 and was succeeded by Diane Kim in February 2026.

=== Other activities ===
Tsai joined the board of directors of the education nonprofit Room to Read in March 2021. Tatcha has partnered with the organization since 2014.

== Personal life ==
Tsai met Eric Bevan in 1998 while she was a student at Wellesley and he was at the Massachusetts Institute of Technology; they married on May 29, 2004, at the Gamble Mansion in Boston. They have a daughter. Bevan worked at Tatcha, and in 2019 The New York Times described the couple as the company's founders and reported that both remained with the company after its sale to Unilever. In a 2025 interview with Elle, Tsai said that her marriage had ended during the period in which she returned to run Tatcha.
