= Eileen Fisher =

American fashion designer and entrepreneur

Eileen Fisher (born June 6, 1951) is an American fashion designer and entrepreneur. She is the founder of the women's clothing brand Eileen Fisher Inc.

== Biography ==
Fisher grew up in Des Plaines, Illinois, the second of seven children. When Fisher decided to go to college, her father explained that the family could not contribute to her tuition because they needed to save their money to send her younger brother to college as "he would need an education to support his family some day." Fisher explained in an interview to Inc. in 2013: "It didn't upset me — it was the times. I never expected a penny from my parents. I paid all my tuition fees from University of Illinois by working as a waitress." She started as a math major before switching to interior design, graduating in 1972. Fisher then moved to New York City in 1973. She worked as an interior designer and as a graphic artist before establishing her own fashion business. She has two children, Zackary and Sasha, with her ex-husband David Zweibel, and lives in Irvington, New York.

== Company ==
Eileen Fisher
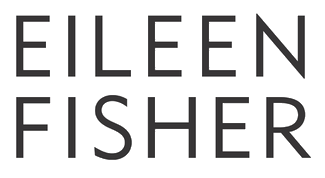
- Type: Privately held company
- Industry: Retail
- Genre: Fashion
- Founded: 1984; 42 years ago
- Founder: Eileen Fisher
- Headquarters: Irvington, New York, United States
- Number of locations: 56+
- Products: Clothing
- Number of employees: 800+
- Website: eileenfisher.com

Eileen Fisher Inc. is an American privately held company founded by Fisher in 1984 with $350 in startup money. Her first order at a New York clothing design show was for $3,000, which was followed three months later with $40,000 in additional sales. She opened her first retail store in 1986 on East 9th Street in Manhattan.

In 2002, the company earned $144 million in revenue, and $154 million in 2003. Estimated revenue in 2015 grew to over $300 million. As of 2003, 35 percent of the company's clothing was manufactured in the United States while the rest was made in China in compliance with Social Accountability International's SA8000.

The company has over 1200 employees with over 56 retail stores in fifteen states.

In 2011, the company expanded outside the U.S., opening its first Canadian store in Vancouver, British Columbia and then more stores in London, England, in October 2012. Since its formation, the company has extended its distribution to over 1,000 wholesale doors and 68 retail stores.

In order to reduce fabric and fiber waste, the company started a recycling program. Customers donate their "gently used" Eileen Fisher clothing in return for a $5 gift certificate per article. After dry cleaning, the garments are resold—with the income funding business grants for women and leadership programs for young women.

== See also ==
- List of fashion designers
- List of people from New York City
- List of University of Illinois at Urbana–Champaign people
- List of New York companies
