= Nancy Twine =

American businesswoman

Nancy Twine is founder and CEO of Briogeo Hair Care, a personal care product company focused on “green beauty,” and the youngest African-American to launch a product line at Sephora.

== Early life and education ==
Twine grew up in West Virginia. She began making beauty products with her grandmother in the kitchen when she was growing up. Twine graduated from the University of Virginia’s McIntire School of Commerce, where she earned a degree in Finance.

== Career ==
Twine's first full-time job was at Goldman Sachs, where she worked in the Commodities Sales Division. She had been an intern at the company the previous summer. By 2009, she was a vice president at Goldman Sachs.

=== Briogeo Hair Care ===
Using the Small Business Library in midtown Manhattan, Twine researched what she would need to do to launch her luxury hair care line. During this time, while working days at Goldman Sachs, she was researching chemists and formulating her products.

Twine launched her beauty company, Briogeo, in 2013. It originally had four products: one shampoo and three conditioners. After taking her products to Cosmoprof, a personal care product trade show, she connected with a merchant from Sephora. Sephora was interested in acquiring Biogeo, and Twine turned in her notice at Goldman Sachs shortly after, in 2014. With this product line launch, Twine became the youngest African American woman to launch a line at Sephora.

Briogeo is sold online at Briogeo.com and at retail stores including Sephora (U.S., Middle East, South East Asia, Australia, and Europe), Nordstrom, MECCA, and ULTA Beauty, and has an estimated 2020 gross revenue of 40 million dollars. Briogeo Hair Care is currently backed by a minority-interest private equity partner, VMG. In April 2022, Briogeo was acquired by Wella.

== Accolades ==
- Forbes 30 Under 30 Judge (2020)
- CEW Female Founder Awards (2019)
- Nylon Beauty Innovator Award (2018)
- Inc. Female Founders 100 (2018)
- Goldman Sachs Builders + Innovators Award (2020)
