= KiwiCo =

American toy company

KiwiCo, Inc.
- Type: Private
- Industry: Toys, education, subscription services, e-commerce
- Founded: October 2011; 15 years ago
- Founder: Sandra Oh Lin
- Headquarters: Mountain View, California, United States
- Area served: Worldwide
- Key people: Sandra Oh Lin (CEO)
- Products: STEAM activity crates, educational kits
- Number of employees: ~100
- Website: www.kiwico.com

KiwiCo, Inc. is an American company headquartered in Mountain View, California. Founded in 2011 by engineer Sandra Oh Lin, the company designs and sells STEM and STEAM activity kits, called crates, and educational toys for children ranging from infants through teenagers. KiwiCo's mission is to equip kids with the curiosity and skills to be innovators, and broaden access to hands-on STEM education. KiwiCo is praised for taking educational subjects and making them play-based and engaging to children, and as of October 2024, the company surpassed $1 billion in lifetime revenue.

== History ==
After years working at Procter & Gamble, PayPal, and eBay, Sandra Oh Lin began creating science experiments and art projects for her children. When her friends encouraged her to turn it into a business, she launched KiwiCo in 2011, offering curated STEM activity kits and project boxes for kids.

KiwiCo initially launched with the Kiwi Crate, a monthly subscription box designed for children ages 5–8, featuring hands-on activities focused on science, art, and imaginative play. The company eventually expanded its products to include additional crate lines tailored to various age groups and interests.

In 2024, KiwiCo expanded their direct-to-consumer subscriptions to retail through partnerships with Target and Barnes & Noble. Many of these toys are wooden, and inspired by a Montessori philosophy.

== Product lines ==
KiwiCo offers various subscription options tailored to different ages and subject matters.

=== Panda Crate (0-36 months) ===
The Panda crate is aimed at early childhood and includes sensory toys and tools for infant development. This crate includes printed materials with expert advice for parents and information related to their baby's development.

=== Koala Crate (3-6 years) ===
Conceptualized for preschool-aged kids, the Koala crate encourages creativity, motor skills and new concepts, like Zoology and camping. The focus of activities in this crate is for children to learn through pretend play.

=== Kiwi Crate (6-9 years) ===
The Kiwi crate offers science and art activities that emphasize imaginative and independent learning. This crate fosters screen-free play and a curiosity about STEAM concepts.

=== Atlas Crate (6-12 years) ===
In 2018, KiwiCo introduced Atlas Crate, designed to teach children about geography and global cultures through immersive learning. Every Atlas Crate, each crate exploring a different country, provides kids hands-on experiences that connect them with lands and people that may be unfamiliar to them.

=== Doodle Crate (6-12 years) ===
The Doodle crate teaches arts and crafts, such as a stained glass sun-catcher or geometric candle, that encourage design thinking. Other activities include, creating a succulent garden out of felt, designing accessories out of faux leather and mixing handmade soap.

=== Tinker Crate (9-12 years) ===
Focused on problem-solving and innovation, these kits encourage science and engineering skills, such as building a toy motorcycle or a biomimetic grabber. STEM is the core concept for this crate, with an emphasis on learning science and engineering principles through fun projects.

=== Eureka Crate (12+ years) ===
In 2018, KiwiCo launched Eureka Crate, with engineering projects for teens and adults, exploring topics like robotics and electronics. The projects are designed to teach the scientific principles behind everyday objects, like pencil sharpeners and wooden ukuleles.

=== Maker Crate (12+ years) ===
In 2019 the company unveiled Maker Crate, an arts and crafts crate providing tools for more complex projects, such as a punch-needle pillow made of macramé or a terrazzo clay tile organizer. The crafts in these crates are ideal for parents looking for an activity to share with older children.

== Education programs ==
In addition to the crates, KiwiCo operates an educational division, KiwiCo Education, that serves schools, after-school programs, camps, and community organizations. As of March 2025, KiwiCo has worked with over 10,000 schools and organizations as part of their Education program, including homeschooling organizations. KiwiCo Education's product offerings include lesson plans, student materials, and are aligned to Next Generation Science Standards (NGSS). The company has stated its goals to scale these offerings as a core component of its mission to broaden access to hands-on STEM education.

== Educational impact ==
=== Research on classroom use ===
A 2024 empirical mixed-methods study conducted by researchers at Johns Hopkins University examined teachers’ implementation of KiwiCo learning crates in a large suburban school district in the western United States. The study surveyed 91 elementary school teachers across 30 schools and conducted interviews with educators who had used the crates in either a summer school or academic-year STEAM program. The study found that teachers perceived the crates as effective in improving student motivation, interest in STEAM subjects, confidence, and the development of 21st-century skills such as problem-solving and collaboration. The authors concluded that the kits held a positive reputation among educators for their educational value and classroom applicability.

=== Reviews of crates ===
Parenting expert and economist Emily Oster described KiwiCo's activities as “thoughtful” and encouraging of skill building and independent play. The crates across lines are often described by parents as encouraging their kids’ imaginations and promoting learning through play.
