= Colin and Samir =

American YouTube channel

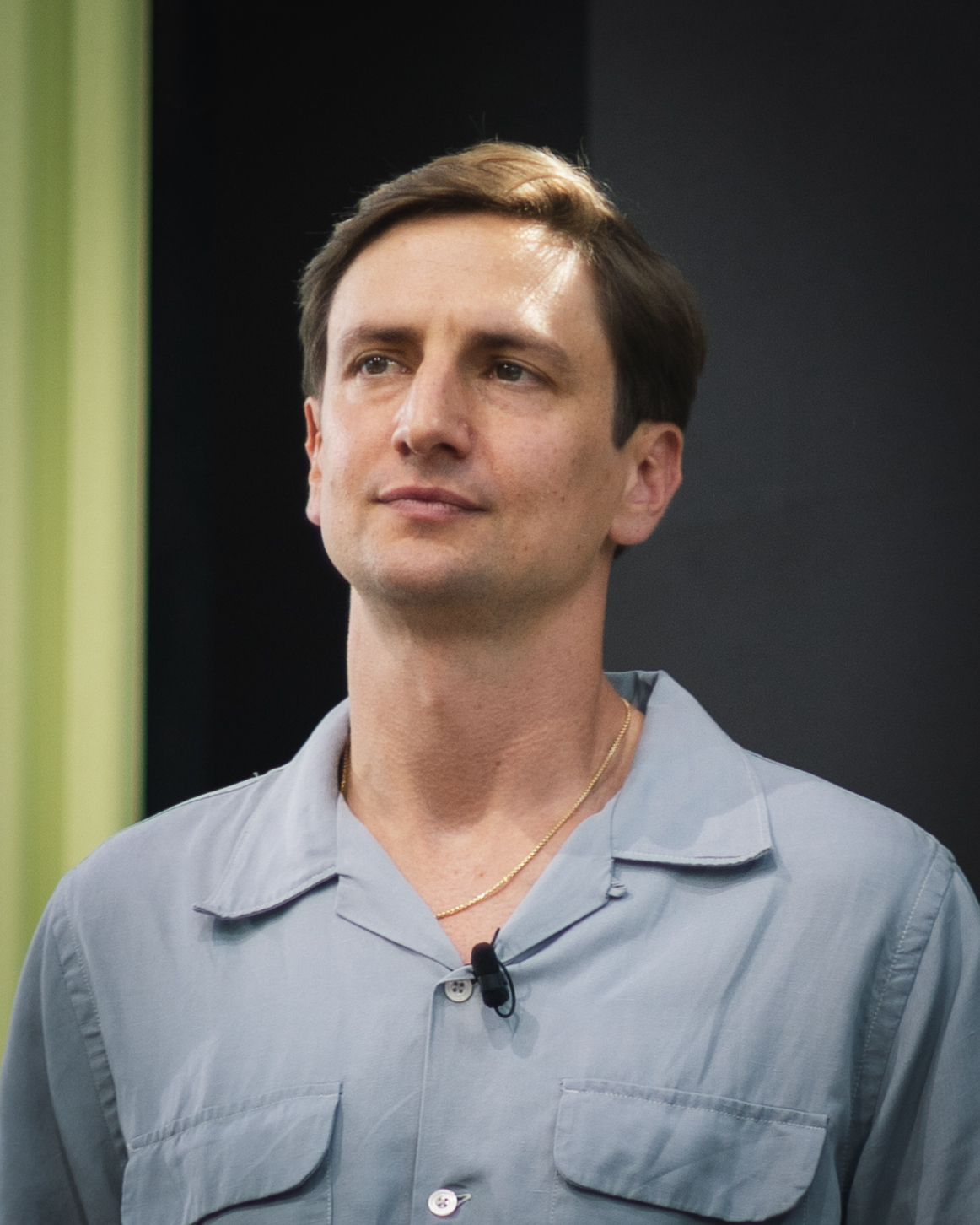
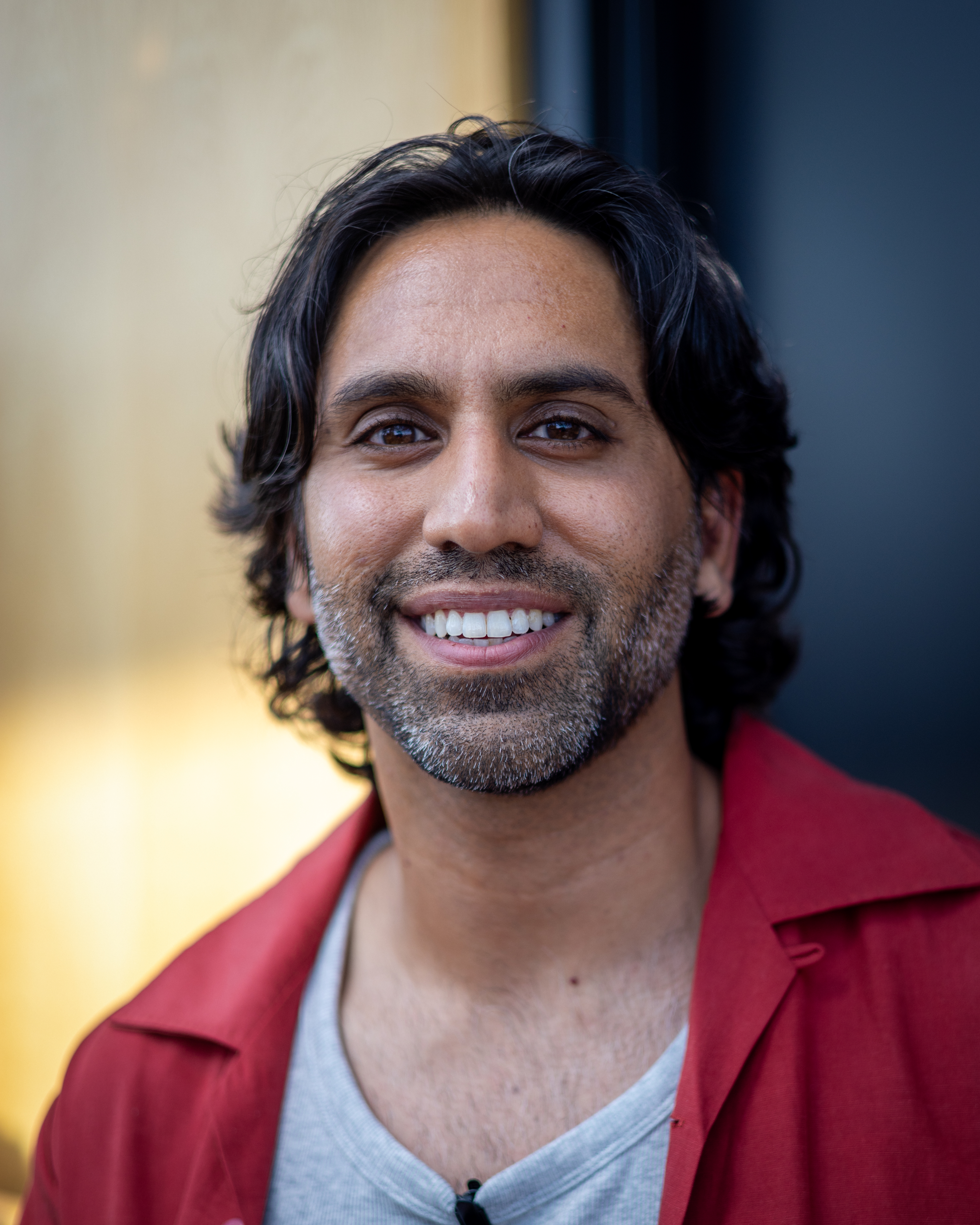
- Rosenblum (left) and Chaudry (right) in 2025
- Born: Colin Rosenblum; January 31, 1989 (age 37) Princeton, New Jersey, U.S.; Samir Chaudry; August 17, 1989 (age 37) Santa Monica, California, U.S.

YouTube information
- Channel: Colin and Samir
- Years active: 2016–present
- Genres: Podcast; business
- Subscribers: 1.62 million
- Views: 453.5 million
- Last updated: 3 May 2026
- Website: www.colinandsamir.com

Colin and Samir is an American YouTube channel composed of American entrepreneurs Colin Rosenblum (born January 31, 1989) and Samir Chaudry (born August 17, 1989). The duo interview creators on their podcast, The Colin and Samir Show, about their rise and give advice supporting up-and-coming channels, breaking down the industry.

== Early life ==
Colin Rosenblum was born on January 31, 1989, in Princeton, New Jersey. He attended the Hun School of Princeton and graduated from the University of Colorado Boulder with degrees in Economics and Italian. Samir Chaudry was born on August 17, 1989, in Santa Monica, California. His parents were refugees from the Partition of India. He attended Harvard-Westlake School and graduated from the University of California, Santa Cruz in 2012, studying Film and Digital Media. Both played lacrosse for their high school and college teams.

== Career ==
Rosenblum and Chaudry started making videos on YouTube since 2012, but they created their current channel in September 2016. Chaudry initially had the idea to create a sports network, eventually creating The Lacrosse Network (TLN) in 2012. Meanwhile, in Boulder, Colorado, Rosenblum was also making videos about lacrosse while simultaneously working at the front desk of a hotel. Chaudry watched some of Rosenblum's videos and was able to convince him to move to Los Angeles to join TLN, originally as a three-month internship. They became friends, however, and built a relationship that caused Rosenblum to move completely to Los Angeles. TLN was bought by the multi-channel network Whistle Sports in June 2014. The duo left TLN in 2016 to pursue filmmaking.

The duo appeared on Paul Rabil's Suiting Up podcast in November 2017. In 2020, they became a year-long brand ambassador for Samsung. The Colin and Samir Show became available on LinkedIn in 2022. In December 2022, at the video marketing conference VidSummit, the channel hit 1 million subscribers while they were onstage speaking. In 2025, the duo interviewed Mark Zuckerberg about his projects at Meta Platforms. MrBeast also appeared in the same interview.

== Personal life ==
Chaudry married his wife Katie in April 2022 and Rosenblum married his wife, Madilyn (née Myers), in April 2024. Both of Rosenblum and Chaudry's homes burnt down in the Palisades Fire in 2025. Dude Perfect organized a GoFundMe page to support them. Both of their wives were pregnant at the time. Chaudry's son was born in January 2025 and Rosenblum's son was born in July 2025.

== Awards and nominations ==
Year	Award	Category	Result	Ref.
2022	Streamy Awards	Learning and Education	Nominated	
2023	Streamy Awards	Learning and Education	Nominated	
