= Perry Chen =

American artist and entrepreneur

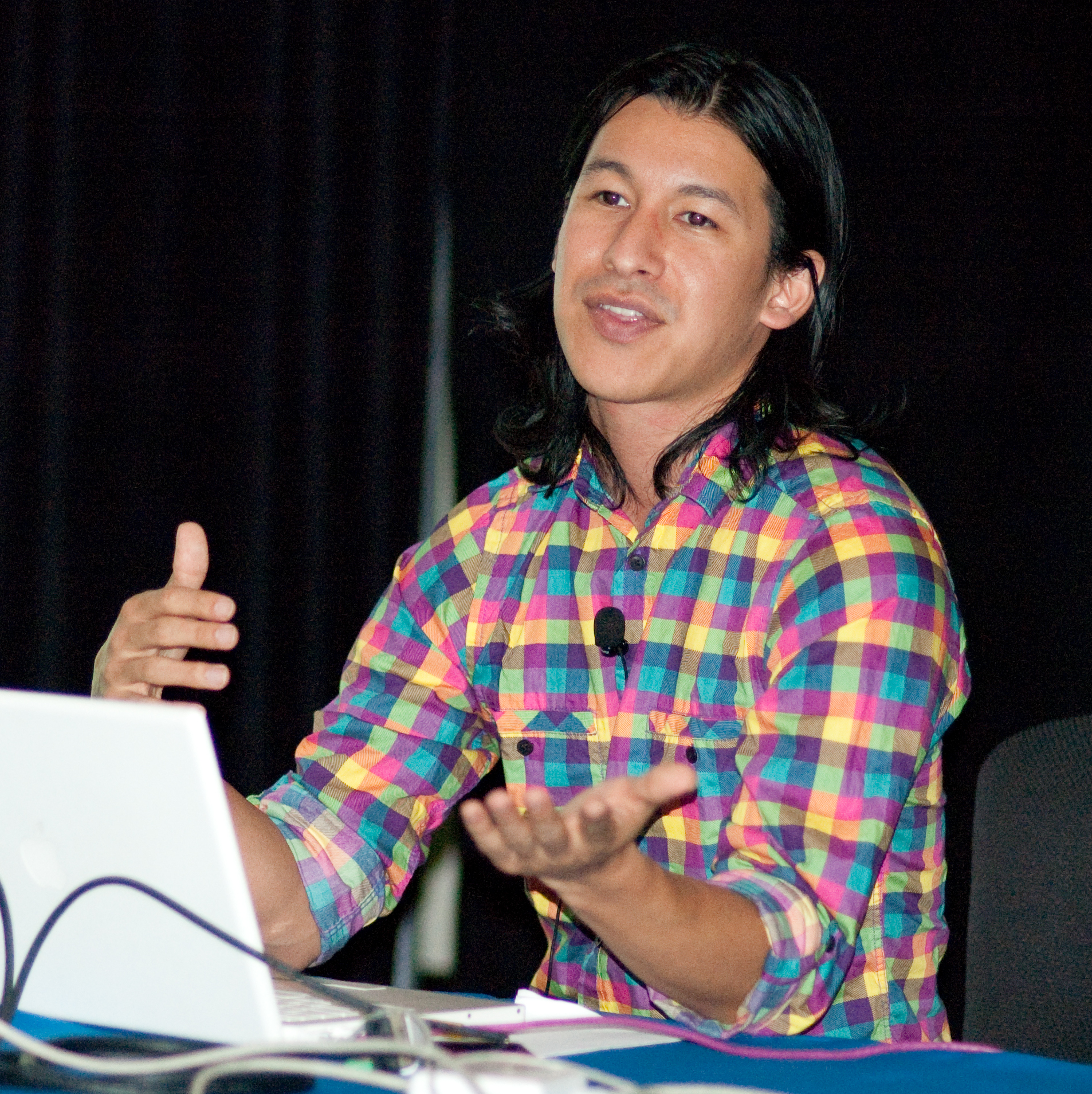
- Chen in 2010
- Born: July 15, 1976 (age 50); New York City, New York, U.S.
- Occupation: Chairman of Kickstarter
- Website: Perry Chen Studio

Perry Chen (born July 15, 1976) is an American entrepreneur best known for being the creator and principal founder of Kickstarter, the online crowdfunding platform for creative projects. He came up with the idea for Kickstarter in 2001 and launched it in 2009 along with co-founders Charles Adler and Yancey Strickler.

== Education ==
Chen is an alumnus of Hunter College High School in New York City and Tulane University's Freeman School of Business in New Orleans.

== Work ==
Chen co-founded the Southfirst gallery in Brooklyn in 2001, was a TED Fellow in 2010, a resident of Laboratorio para la Ciudad in Mexico City in 2014, and is a 2016 Director's Fellow at the MIT Media Lab. In 2017, he was appointed to the Knight Commission on Trust, Media and American Democracy — a nonpartisan commission of leaders across media, technology, and public policy tasked with guiding the public discourse on rebuilding trust in America's democratic institutions.

In 2013, he was listed as a 'Pioneer' on the annual list of Time's 100 most influential people.

In 2014, Chen stepped down as chief executive officer of Kickstarter and left the role to co-founder Yancey Strickler. December 2014, Chen exhibited "Computers in Crisis" for the New Museum's First Look program, co-presented by Rhizome and Creative Time Reports. The exhibition included the event Y2K+15, an exploration of the phenomenon and legacy of Y2K, held at the New Museum. In 2017, Chen returned again as CEO where he remained until March 2019. He continues to serve as chairman of Kickstarter's board.

== Personal life ==
Chen grew up on Roosevelt Island, New York.

== See also ==
- Tech companies in the New York metropolitan area
