= Donnel Baird =

American entrepreneur (born 1981)

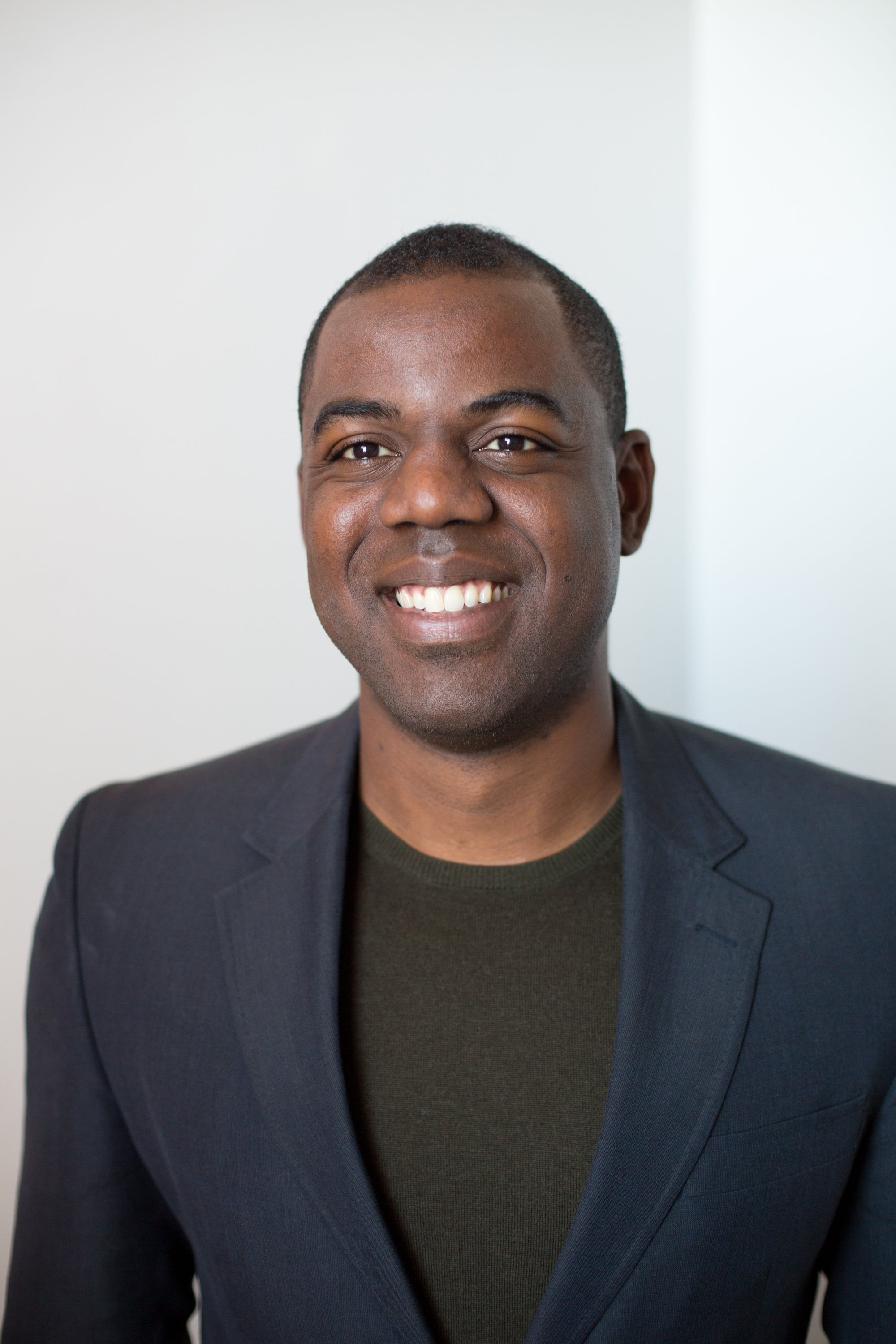
- Born: 1981 (age 44–45); Brooklyn, New York
- Education: Duke University (Bachelor's) Columbia Business School (MBA)
- Occupation: Founder of BlocPower

Donnel Baird (born 1981) is an American climate entrepreneur and political organizer. He is the Founder of BlocPower.

== Early life and education ==
Baird grew up in the Brooklyn borough of New York City, raised by parents who immigrated to the United States in 1980. His family started life together in a one-bedroom apartment with a shared bathroom with a neighbor in Bedford-Stuyvesant, Brooklyn. His father worked at night cleaning boilers, while his mother was a home health aide and student in a teachers program at York College. Living in a decrepit building, his family relied on natural gas powered stoves for heating during the winter, while opening windows to release harmful toxins.

In the early 1990s Baird's parents divorced, and his mother and both children moved to Atlanta, Georgia. Baird attended 6 years of public school, then won a scholarship to a prep school. Baird attended Duke University. During his time at Duke, the exoneration of the police who shot innocent Amadou Diallo had a profound effect on Baird and sank him into a depression. His relationship with historian Larry Goodwyn, Dr. Marie Lynn Miranda, and classmate Mariana Arcaya persuaded Baird to study the African American non violent civil rights movement, the 1890s American agrarian Populist movement, and to pursue environmental issues and racial equity.

Baird earned his bachelor's degree at Duke University, after which he moved back to New York City and spent several years as a community organizer in a housing non profit, working to bridge the gap between the privileged students he encountered at Duke and the underprivileged kids he grew up with in his neighborhood. He wanted to create a business that could address the intersection of climate change and providing employment opportunities for low-income families. Baird spent 18 months as a senior Voter Contact Director for then Senator Obama’s 2008 presidential campaign in 7 states. In 2009, he become National Field Director with the Change To Win Labor Federation, focused on partnering with the Department of Energy to help create living wage green energy jobs under the Obama Administration. He continued his graduate study at Columbia Business School, where he earned a Master of Business and Administration (MBA) in 2013. during business school, Baird served as the national Get Out The Vote director for a labor union that independently invested $70mm in President Obama’s reelection campaign.

== BlocPower ==
During his last semester at Columbia Business School, Baird launched BlocPower, a Brooklyn-based technology company. BlocPowers investors include Goldman Sachs, Kapor Capital, and Andreessen Horowitz. BlocPower achieved $93mm in revenue in 2023. Baird stepped down as CEO in 2024.

== Social impact and recognition ==
In 2014, Baird was named a "Champion of Change" by the White House for his efforts in advancing clean energy and economic opportunity. In 2017, Baird was recognized as a Crain’s "40 Under 40" of influential young leaders. BlocPower was recognized by CNBC on the list of CNBCs “Disruptor” list of the most innovative startups in America, and the 4th Most Innovative Company in the World by Fast Company. Goldman Sachs honored Baird as one of the “100 Most Intriguing Entrepreneurs of 2021”, and Columbia Business School honored Baird as the 2021 “Entrepreneur of the Year”. Baird was named the “Innovator of the Year” by the National Venture Capital Association. In 2024, Baird was a keynote speaker at Verdical Group's annual Net Zero Conference.

Baird's achievements have been featured in numerous media outlets, including The New Yorker, Forbes, and Fast Company, amongst others. Baird was featured on TIME magazine's 100 Next in 2022. and was named TIME magazine’s inaugural "TIME Dreamer of the Year".

He has also been invited to speak at events such as TED and the World Economic Forum in Davos.

Beyond his role at BlocPower, Baird serves or has served on the boards of several organizations, including the New York Federal Reserve Bank Second District Board, the United States Securities and Exchange Commission Small Business Capital Formation Advisory Committee, Al Gore's Climate Reality Project, the Sierra Club Foundation, and The Sunrise Movement.
