= Sarah Miyazawa LaFleur =

American businesswoman and fashion designer

Sarah Miyazawa LaFleur is a businesswoman and fashion designer of Japanese and American descent. She is the founder and CEO of MM.LaFleur.

== Biography ==
LaFleur was born in Paris, France, the daughter of Christopher J. LaFleur, the former United States Ambassador to Malaysia, and Keiko Miyazawa, the daughter of Kiichi Miyazawa, who served as Prime Minister of Japan from 1991 to 1993. Her younger sister is Emma Miyazawa.

She wore designs by Hanae Mori at the Bal des débutantes on December 7, 2002. She graduated from Harvard University in 2006.

LaFleur worked as a management counselor for Bain & Company and TechnoServe in New York City. She worked in South Africa where she studied business opportunities in agriculture. She then worked for a private equity firm, Starwood Capital Group, in New York and Paris. LaFleur left financial counseling to found MM.LaFleur, which she named after her mother, in April 2011, along with Miyako Nakamura and Narie Foster. In February 2020 LaFleur announced the company will lend free clothing to any woman running for office.

LaFleur is one of the signatories of a letter intended for Donald Trump and the United States Congress in an attempt to keep the Deferred Action for Childhood Arrivals in place throughout the United States.
