= King of Prussia Town Center =

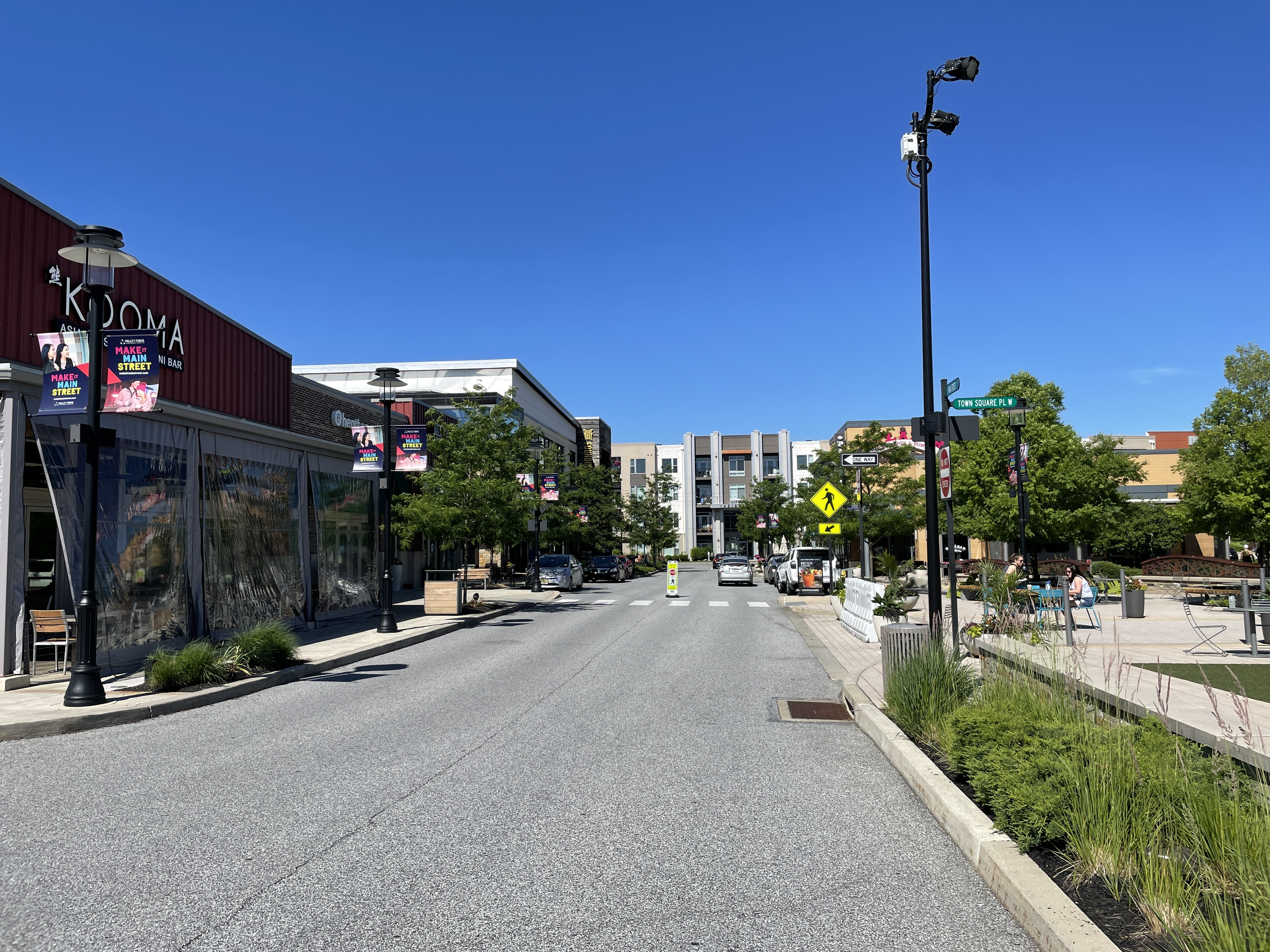
- Main Street at King of Prussia Town Center
- Location: King of Prussia, Pennsylvania, United States
- Coordinates: 40.084489°N 75.403503°W
- Address: 155 Village Drive
- Opened: 2016; 10 years ago
- Developer: JBG Smith
- Manager: CBRE Group
- Owner: Funds managed by CBRE Group
- Num. of stores: 37
- Floor area: 390,000 sq ft (36,232 m^{2})
- Parking: Street parking, parking lot
- Public transit: SEPTA bus: 92, 124
- Website: kingofprussia-towncenter.com

King of Prussia Town Center is a lifestyle center in the census-designated place of King of Prussia, Pennsylvania, in Upper Merion Township, Montgomery County, Pennsylvania. The center is just west of the King of Prussia Mall.

It is part of the Village at Valley Forge, 122-acre mixed-use development which consists of the retail development along with apartments, townhouses, condominiums, office space, and the Children's Hospital of Philadelphia's "Specialty Care and Surgery Center". The town center features a downtown area with a Main Street that contains several dining, retail, and service establishments and Town Square, a grassy area surrounded by water features and a 60 feet (18 m) custom fire wall.

Anchor stores include Wegmans, Nordstrom Rack, Ulta Beauty, REI, and LA Fitness. Other tenants include Williams Sonoma, Founding Farmers, The Habit Burger Grill, Starbucks, Fogo de Chão, SmileDirectClub, Hair Cuttery, and Drybar.

== History ==
In the late 1990s, developer Dennis Maloomian acquired a 138-acre golf course near the King of Prussia Mall and planned a mixed-use residential and retail development that would include a town center for King of Prussia. The proposed development needed to be rezoned, and Maloomian attended Upper Merion Township monthly meetings over a course of 18 months in order to get the golf course rezoned so he could build his development, which was to feature residential and retail development within a golf course that would serve as a buffer. Both township officials and local residents were opposed to the plans. Maloomian would go to court and plead his rights as a property owner were being violated. After several failed appeals, the Pennsylvania Supreme Court ruled in Maloomian's favor in 2003. There were two plans that existed for the proposed development. Maloomian went ahead with a different plan that would create a suburban downtown that would have apartments, townhouses, and offices; he had unsuccessfully attempted to build a similar development at the former site of the Garden State Park Racetrack in Cherry Hill, New Jersey. Despite this, Maloomian had to continue to convince township planners to allow him to build his town center development. In December 2004, he showed township planners a similar development in Reston, Virginia. In 2006, Upper Merion Township and Maloomian reached an agreement that allowed the town center to proceed forward. Construction was delayed by the Great Recession in 2008.

The first part of the town center was completed in 2014 with the opening of a Wegmans grocery store. In April 2015, JBG Smith bought 20 acres from Maloomian to build the lifestyle center. The lifestyle center opened in summer 2016. Both the Nordstrom Rack and LA Fitness anchor stores relocated from a shopping center near the King of Prussia Mall. Construction of the King of Prussia Town Center cost $100 million. Offices and residential were constructed as part of the larger Village at Valley Forge.

In 2017, JBG Smith sold the property to funds managed by CBRE Group for $183 million.

In 2019, Williams Sonoma signed a lease at the center.

== Gallery ==
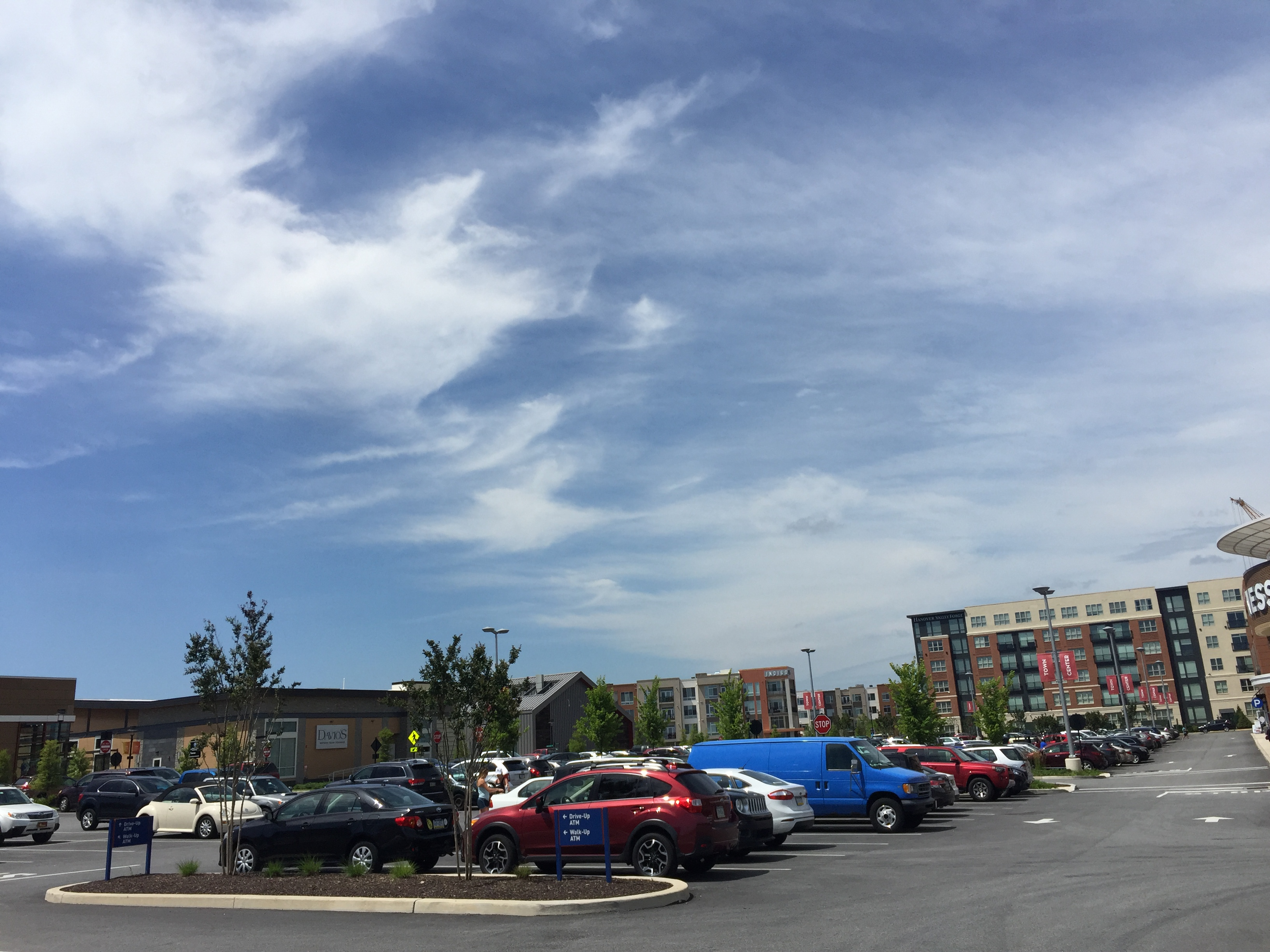
King of Prussia Town Center residential units

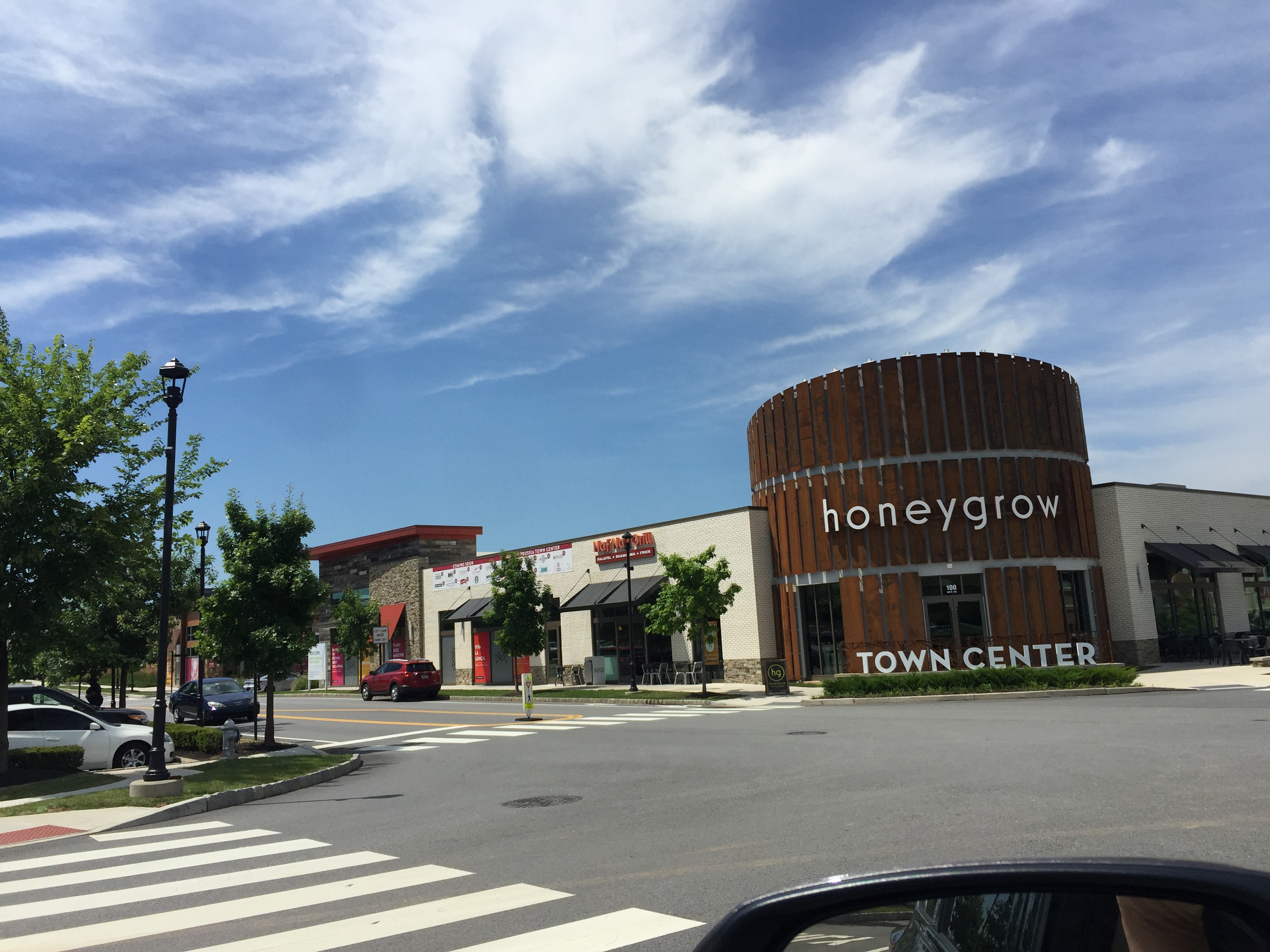
King of Prussia Town Center commercial area near Wegmans
