= Dry bar =

Dry bar may refer to:

- a temperance (alcohol-free) bar
- a wet bar that does not include a sink with running water
- Dry Bar Comedy, a clean comedy club associated with Angel Studios, based in Provo, UT
- Drybar, a California-based chain of salons
