= Unilife =

Defunct American pharmaceutical supply company

Unilife Corporation

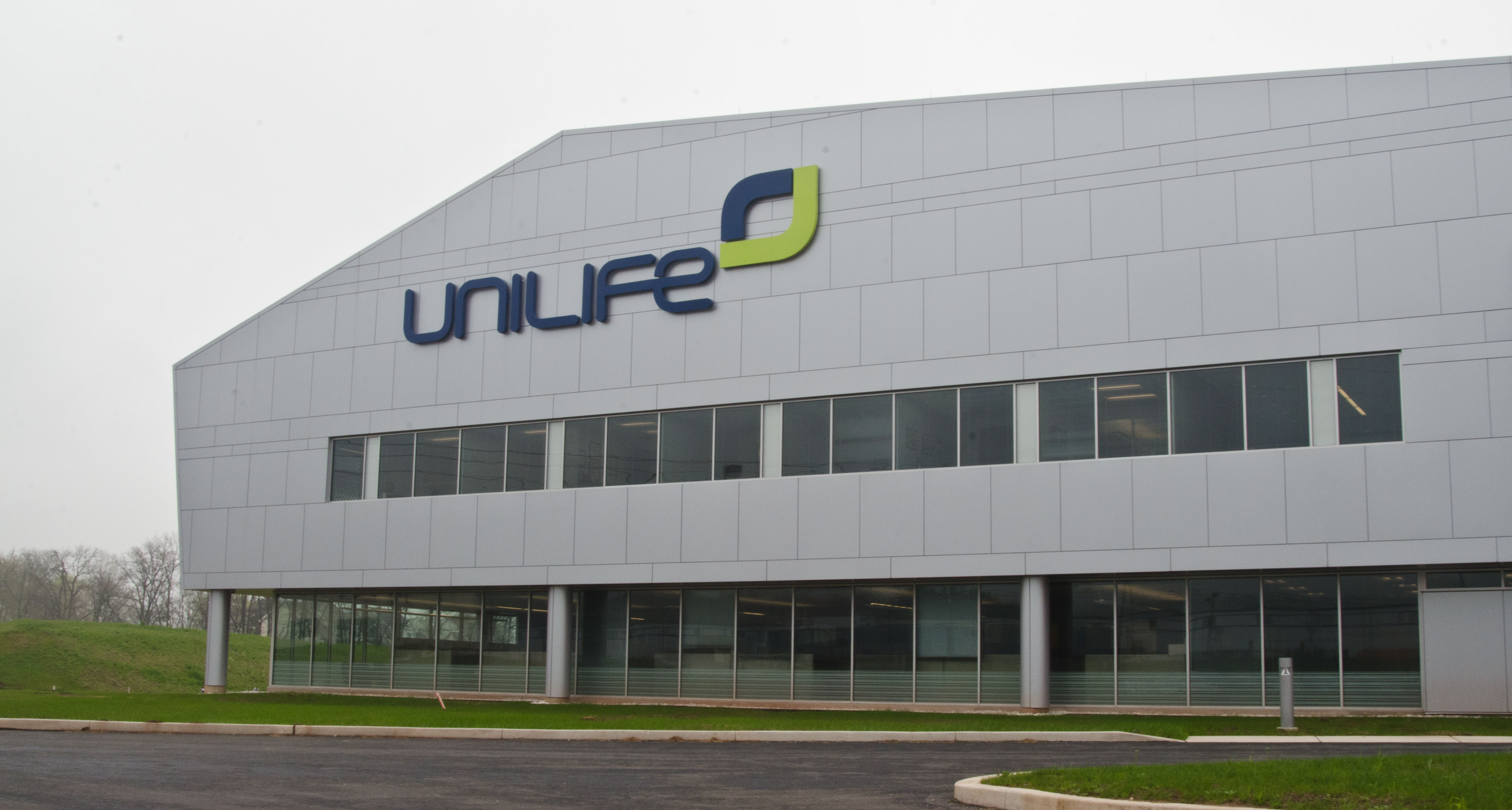
- Unilife's facility in York, PA, partially funded by a USDA loan
- Company type: Public
- Traded as: Nasdaq: UNIS, ASX: UNIS
- Industry: Pharmaceutical industry
- Founded: 2002
- Defunct: 2017
- Fate: Bankrupt
- Headquarters: York, Pennsylvania, United States
- Area served: Worldwide
- Key people: John Ryan (President & CEO)
- Revenue: $190.8 million (2015)
- Net income: ($90 million) (2015)
- Number of employees: 280 (2015)
- Website: www.unilife.com

Unilife Corporation was an American developer, manufacturer, and supplier of injectable drug delivery systems. The company was headquartered in King of Prussia, Pennsylvania and had its research and production facility based in York, Pennsylvania. The company operated from 2002 until it went bankrupt in 2017.

Unilife's business model was for pharmaceutical companies to utilize Unilife products in a format where they can be filled and packaged with an injectable therapy prior to its shipment to the end-user.

== History ==
The company was founded in 2002

Throughout 2015, Unilife was a growing company specialising in developing various types of medical drug delivery systems that would provide partnering pharmaceutical customers with unique combination products serving as the drug storage container as well as a safe, simple to use, and effective form of drug delivery.

The company was originally organised with multiple independent business units, developing single-use safety syringes (designed for the needle to automatically retract upon completion of delivery) focused on various use cases and design platforms such as subcutaneous delivery, ocular delivery, wearable injectors, reconstitution systems, and automatic injection systems.

During the years 2015 and 2016, the company reduced hiring and went through a few internal business unit reorganisations to shift focus to fewer platforms, eventually settling on a single focus on the development of wearable injector platforms during the summer of 2016. After experiencing financial difficulties, Unilife began Chapter 11 bankruptcy proceedings in April 2017 and was forced to cease operations in July 2017.
