= Fred Sherman (business commentator) =

American business commentator

Fred Sherman (January 7, 1924 – September 12, 2009) was an American economist, businessman and business commentator based in Philadelphia, Pennsylvania. Sherman broadcast as a business commentator on KYW News Radio for more than 25 years until his retirement in January 2009 due to budget cuts at the station. He was known to radio and television audiences for his trademark sign-off, "I'm Fred Sherrrrrman."

Sherman was born in Brooklyn, New York, to parents, Nathan and Eva (née Josephthal) Sherman. His father owned a candy store, while his mother was a teacher. He graduated from Washington Heights High School in the Manhattan and took courses at New York University, but did not earn a degree from NYU. He would later enroll at Temple University.

Sherman enlisted in the U.S. Army Air Forces during World War II, and served in the 82d Airborne Army Rangers. Sherman flew missions over Nazi-occupied France before and after the 1944 D-Day Invasion.

Sherman considered becoming a journalist following World War II, but began working at his father-in-law's furniture business instead. He left the furniture business when he was 60 years old and obtained his stockbroker's license the same year. He eventually became the chief economist for both Sovereign Bank and Royal Bank America, which is based in Narberth, Pennsylvania.

Sherman became involved with radio as a business commentator during the 1980s. Sherman contacted Don Lancer, the business and financial editor of KYW 1060 radio, noting that the station's coverage of financial news was dull. Sherman told Lancer that he could make KYW's coverage more lively and entertaining. Sherman was hired by Lancer after an audition. He used humor, irreverence and wit to reach his audiences.

Sherman was known for his trademark, elongated sign-off, "I'm Fred Sherrrrrman", at the end of his commentaries. He began saying his name that way after hearing another reporter use the same speaking style. The sign-off, which earned Sherman both praise and criticism, made Sherman into a local celebrity in the Philadelphia region.

Sherman remained as a business commentator at KYW for twenty-five years, until KYW cut his commentaries in January 2009, citing financial constraints. Sherman also appeared on The Money Show on WPEN and contributed weekly television business segments to the Sunday morning news on WCAU NBC 10.

Fred Sherman, a resident of King of Prussia, Pennsylvania, died on September 12, 2009, at the Hospital of the University of Pennsylvania in Philadelphia at the age of 85. Sherman had suffered from several health problems, including kidney ailments, and injuries from a car accident several weeks before his death may have contributed to his declining health. He suffered the car accident shortly after returning from a trip to Europe in July 2009, and had been hospitalized on several occasions since the accident.

Sherman was survived by his longtime fiancee, Diane Williams. The couple had met 17 years prior to his death when Williams approached Sherman for financial advice at one of his speeches. He was also survived by his son, David Sherman. Another of his sons, Henry Sherman, died in 2000.
