= King of Prussia Inn =

- U.S. National Register of Historic Places
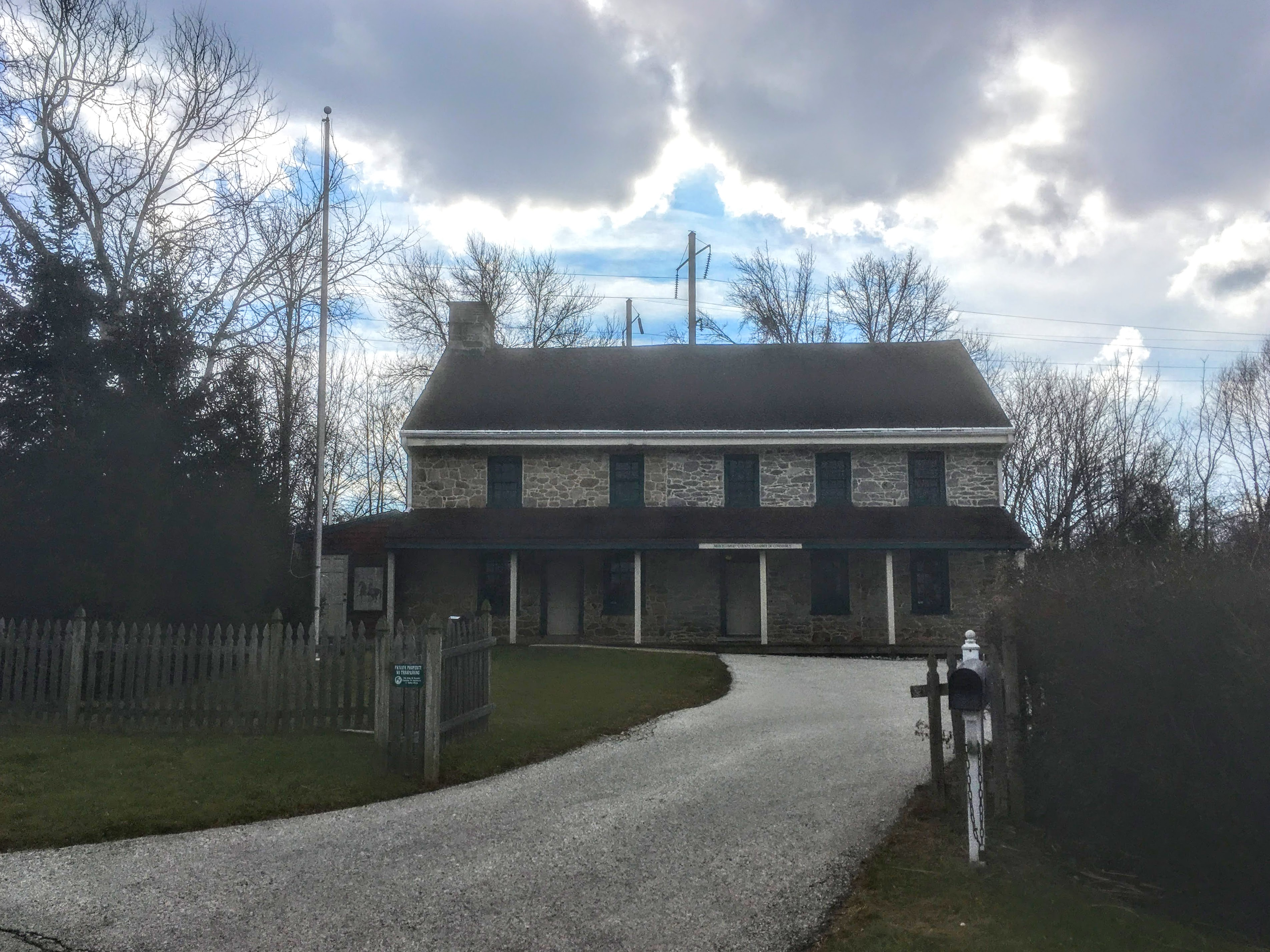
- The inn in February 2017

- Location within Pennsylvania Location within the United States
- Location: 101 Bill Smith Blvd, King of Prussia, Pennsylvania
- Coordinates: 40°05′04″N 75°22′58″W
- Built: 1719
- Architect: William Rees (builder)
- NRHP reference No.: 75001656
- Added to NRHP: December 23, 1975

The King of Prussia Inn is a historic tavern in King of Prussia, Pennsylvania. It was listed on the National Register of Historic Places in 1975.

== History ==
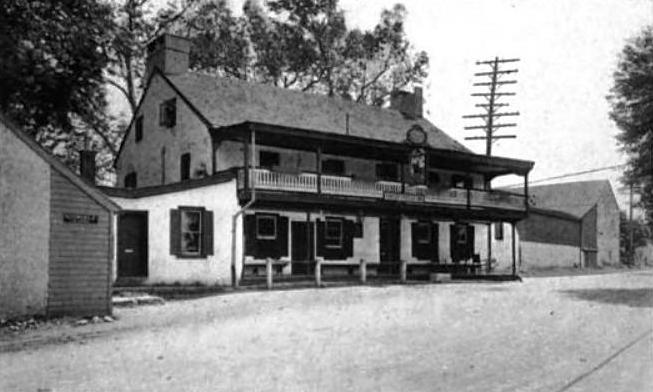
The inn as it appeared circa 1919, prior to restoration and relocation

The original inn was constructed as a cottage at the intersection of Swedesford Road (now U.S. Route 202) and Gulph Road in 1719 by the Welsh Quakers William and Janet Rees. The cottage was converted to an inn in 1769 and was important in colonial times, as it was approximately a day's travel by horse from Philadelphia. A number of settlers heading from there for Ohio would sleep at the inn for their first night on the road. In 1774 the Rees family hired James Barry (or Jimmy Berry) to run the inn, which henceforth became known as "Berry's Tavern". General George Washington first visited the tavern on Thanksgiving Day in 1777 while the Continental Army was encamped at Whitemarsh; a few weeks later Washington and the army bivouacked at nearby Valley Forge.

A map created by William Parker, an American Loyalist, listed the inn as "Berry's" in 1777, but a local petition in 1786 identified it as the "King of Prussia". It was possibly renamed to entice German soldiers fighting in the American Revolution to remain in this area. At some point a wooden signboard of the inn depicted King Frederick the Great of Prussia. The inn was listed on the U.S. National Register of Historic Places on December 23, 1975.

== Diary of Johann Conrad Döhla ==
The King of Prussia Inn is mentioned in a 1778 entry from the diary of Johann Conrad Döhla, a soldier from Ansbach-Bayreuth who fought on the British side during the war:

I must also comment that the King of Prussia has a house in Philadelphia and therefore is a citizen and enjoys the rights of citizenship. This house is built of wood and is supposed to have been put together and built in East Friesland, brought from there to England and on a ship to Philadelphia, where it was put up in one night. It is called in their language a "Tavern," in German an inn or pub ("Gast- oder Wirtshaus"), which bears a signboard showing the King of Prussia.

== Relocation ==
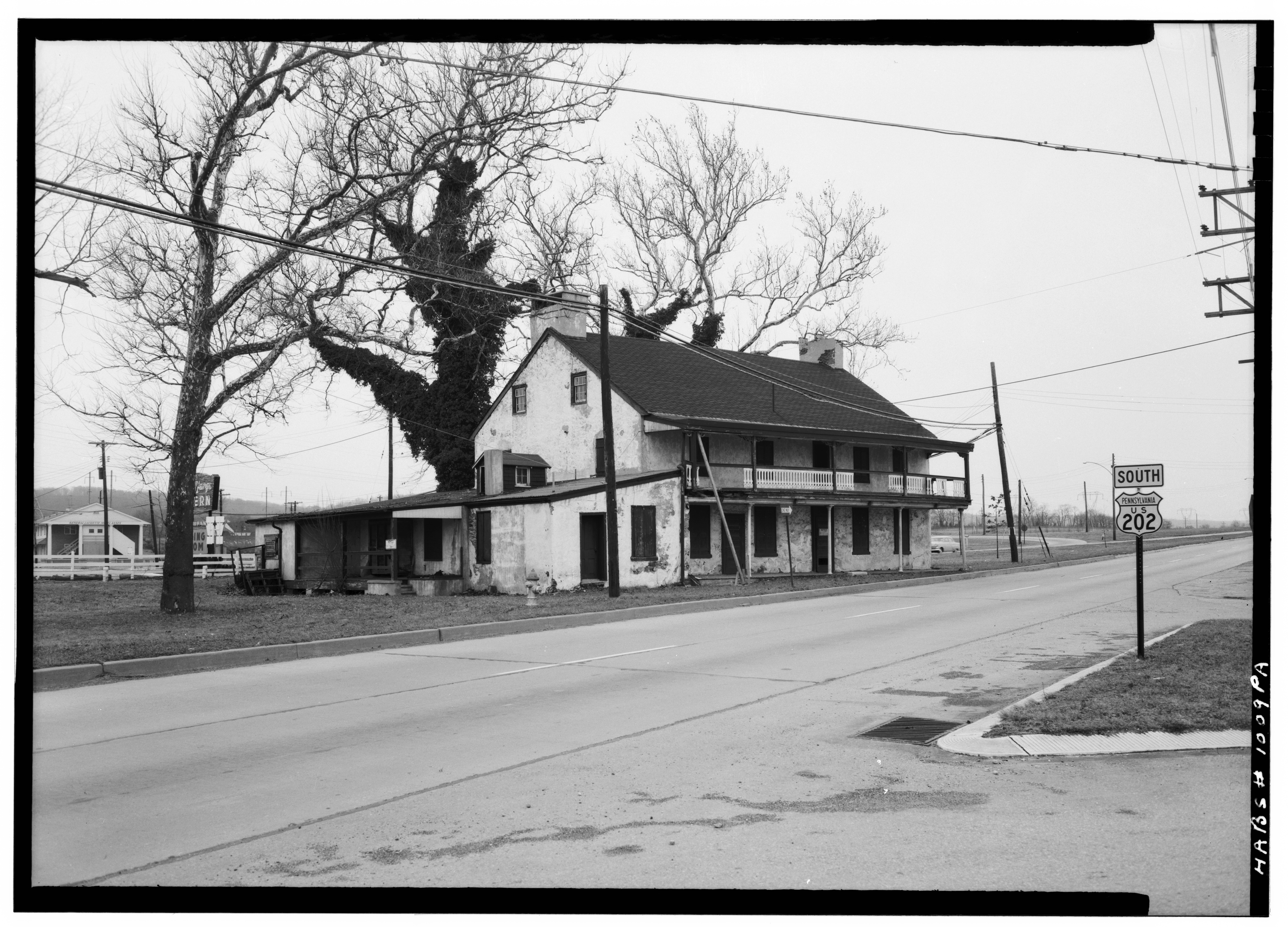
The King of Prussia Inn in the median of Route 202, 1960

The original location of the inn, at what are now the left-turn lanes for North Gulph Road on Route 202

The inn remained in operation until 1952. That year, the Pennsylvania Highway Department proposed the conversion of U.S. Route 202, now a major north–south highway that passes through the town from southwest to northeast, from a two-lane road to a four-lane divided highway; this plan called for the demolition of the King of Prussia Inn. However, historic preservationists managed to prevail upon the Commonwealth of Pennsylvania to avoid the inn by building north and southbound lanes on either side of it.

The Commonwealth of Pennsylvania acquired the property on which the inn was located in 1952. For more than 50 years the inn was marooned on an artificial island, with cars and trucks roaring past it on both sides. It was sealed up for years, surrounded by a high fence. After the further expansion of U.S. Route 202 was proposed in 1997, the inn was successfully relocated about a half-mile east to 101 Bill Smith Boulevard on August 20, 2000. The King of Prussia Chamber of Commerce (now the Montgomery County Chamber of Commerce) has occupied the building since its restoration in 2002.
