= Alli Webb =

American entrepreneur and author

- Education: Florida State University
- Occupations: Businesswoman; writer
- Known for: co-founder of Drybar

Alli Webb is an American businesswoman and writer. She is the co-founder of Drybar, a chain of American salons providing a hairstyling service known as blowouts.

== Early life and education ==
Growing up in Boca Raton, Florida, Webb attended Olympic Heights Community High School. Webb's parents owned a clothing business, which sparked her interest in fashion. She left Florida State University after one year, and moved to New York City, where her brother worked for Nicole Miller. Webb also began working for Miller in New York.

== Career ==
Webb and her brother later left New York City for their native Florida, where they opened more stores for Miller. When the two chose to end their partnership, Webb attended The Art Institute of Fort Lauderdale. She was trained in hairdressing by Toni & Guy and worked under John Sahag.

In 2010, Webb co-founded Drybar with her brother Michael Landau and her then husband Cameron Webb. By 2019, there were over 125 locations. In 2013, Webb developed a line of styling tools and products.

In 2016, Webb released The Drybar Guide To Good Hair For All; a New York Times bestseller.

In July 2018, Webb launched a podcast with Landau called “Raising the Bar."

In 2019, Webb joined season 10 of ABC's Shark Tank as a new guest shark. She and Landau launched "Squeeze", a massage service with associated app.

Webb was named one of the “100 Most Creative People in Business” by Fast Company in 2013, and included on Fortune's "40 Under 40" list that same year, and ranked as Marie Claire's “Top Beauty Expert” for their Women on Top list in 2011.
