= King of Prussia Volunteer Fire Company 9/11 Memorial =

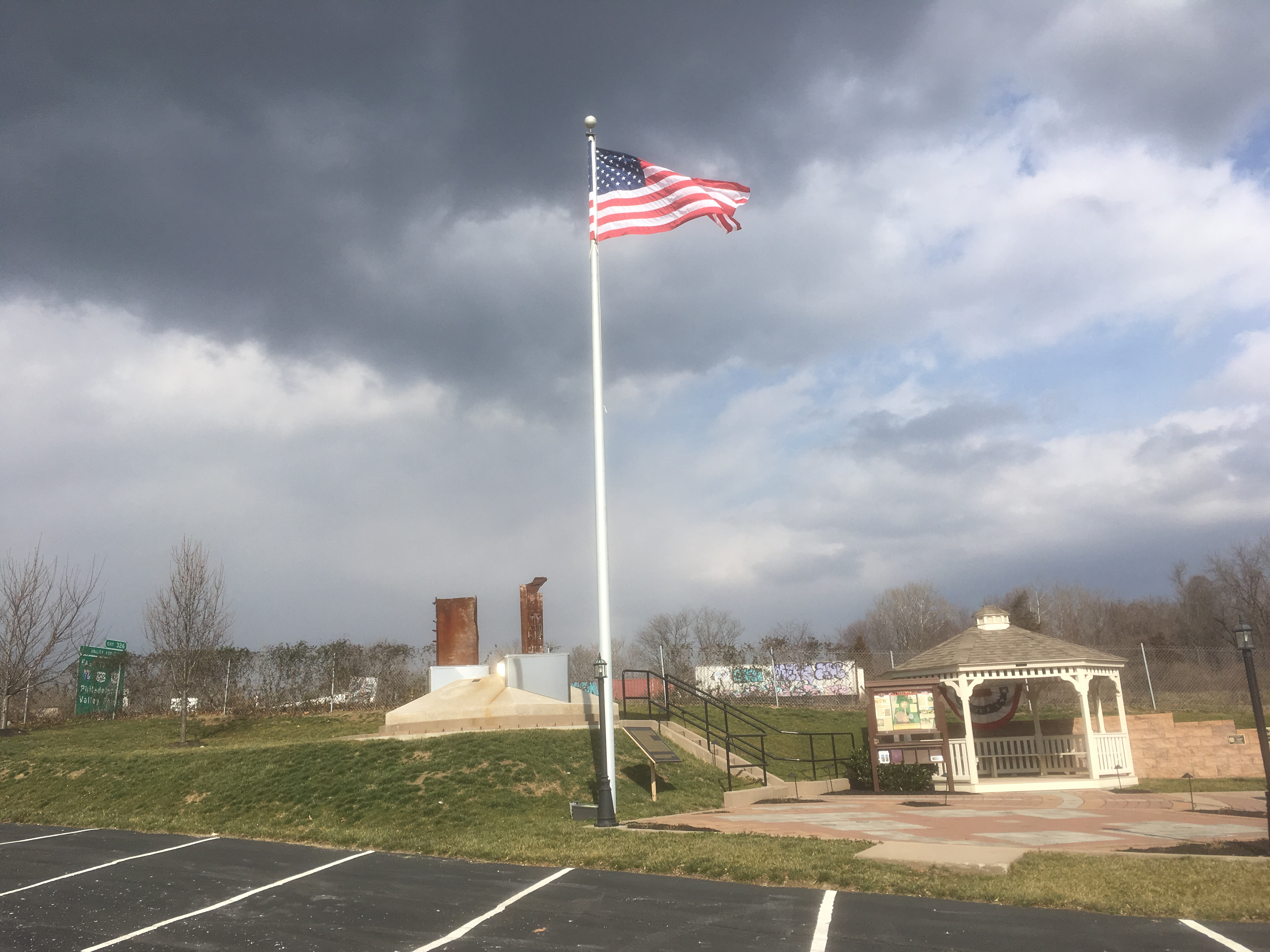
- King of Prussia Volunteer Fire Company 9/11 Memorial
- Interactive map of King of Prussia Volunteer Fire Company 9/11 Memorial
- Location: King of Prussia, Pennsylvania
- Coordinates: 40°05′29″N 75°23′00″W
- Designer: Charles Edwin McDonald Jr.
- Material: Brick, concrete, granite, and stainless steel
- Opening date: September 11, 2011
- Dedicated to: Victims of the September 11 attacks

The King of Prussia Volunteer Fire Company 9/11 Memorial is a memorial in King of Prussia CDP, Pennsylvania, that honors the lives lost in the September 11 attacks in 2001. The memorial is located adjacent to the King of Prussia Volunteer Fire Company station on Allendale Road across from the King of Prussia Mall. The 9/11 Memorial consists of a monument, a gazebo, a patio, and an entrance path and stairs that commemorates the attacks on the World Trade Center and The Pentagon along with the crash of United Airlines Flight 93. Among the features of the memorial are two steel beams that came from the actual World Trade Center. The memorial was dedicated on the tenth anniversary of the attacks on September 11, 2011.

== Location ==
The King of Prussia Volunteer Fire Company 9/11 Memorial is located in King of Prussia in Montgomery County, Pennsylvania, adjacent to the King of Prussia Volunteer Fire Company station on Allendale Road, across from the King of Prussia Mall. The memorial is close to U.S. Route 202, Interstate 76, U.S. Route 422, and the Pennsylvania Turnpike.

== Description ==
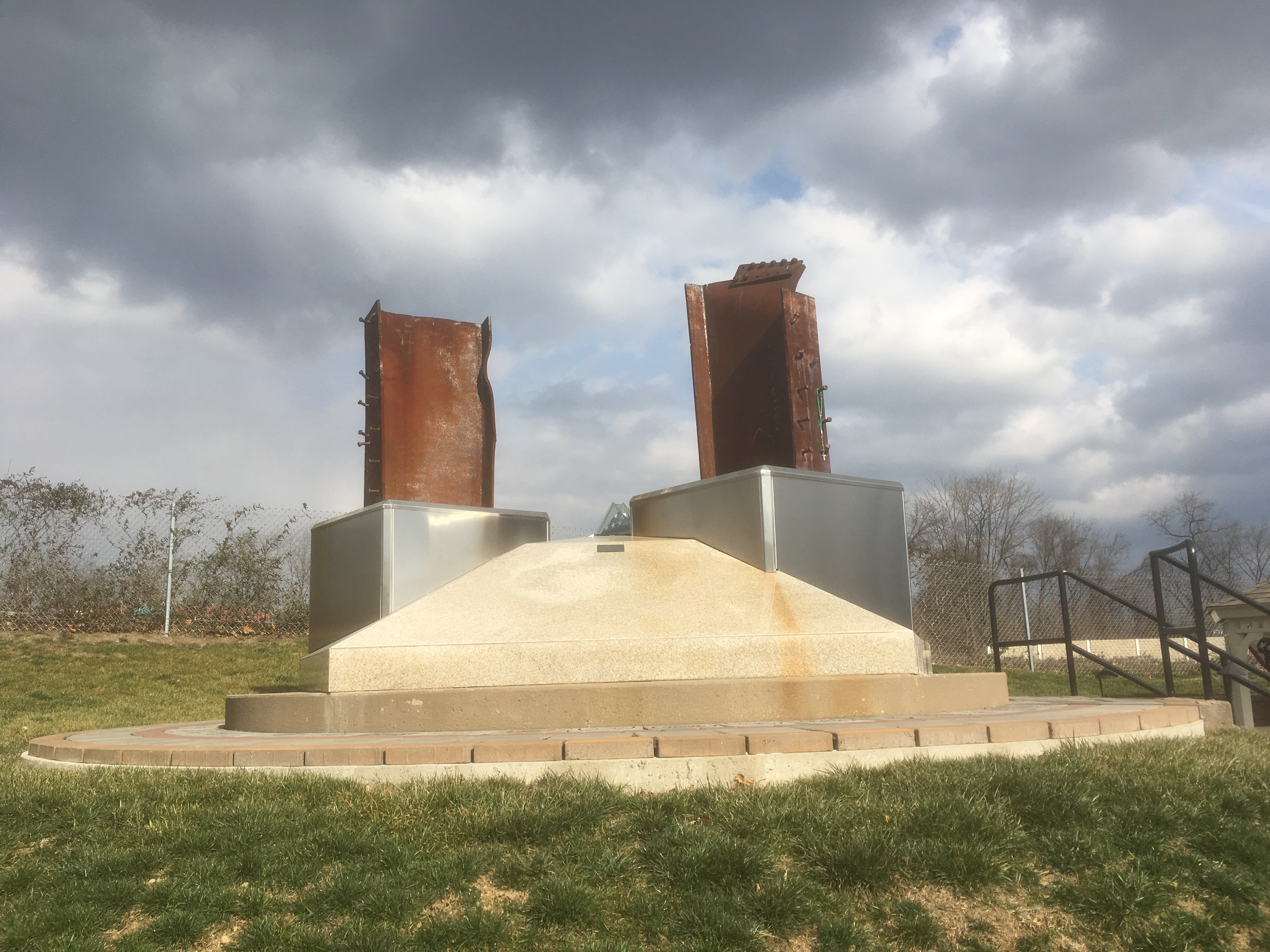
The 9/11 Monument, featuring two steel beams from the World Trade Center

The King of Prussia Volunteer Fire Company 9/11 Memorial is the largest memorial commemorating the September 11 attacks in Montgomery County and consists of four features: the 9/11 Monument, the World Trade Center Patio, the William C. Daywalt Sr. Memorial Gazebo, and the Entrance Pathway and Stairs. The World Trade Center Patio shows the layout of the site of the World Trade Center in New York City, displaying the seven buildings, the central plaza, and the four streets that surround the site. The patio is accurately oriented north–south as it actually was and is in 1/52nd scale. The 9/11 Monument is designed to commemorate the four events that happened during the attacks. The concrete base and walkway around the monument is circular shaped to symbolize the circular hole that was left in the ground from the crash of United Airlines Flight 93 in Shanksville, Pennsylvania. Within the circular base is a pyramidal pentagon made of granite that symbolizes The Pentagon in Arlington, Virginia, and the crash of American Airlines Flight 77 into the building; the granite pentagon is in 1/104th scale. From the top of the pentagon rises two stainless steel tops representing the two towers of the World Trade Center, which are in 1/52nd scale. On top of the stainless steel tops sits two steel beams from the World Trade Center that were recovered from Ground Zero, oriented to represent the elevator cores in the two buildings. The steel beams are about 33 by 12 by 60 inches (84 cm × 30 cm × 152 cm) and weigh about 650 pounds (290 kg); the studs in the steel are 0.75 inches (1.9 cm) in diameter and 3 inches (7.6 cm) long with heads that are 1.25 inches (3.2 cm) in diameter. The circular base has a radius of 33 feet (10 m) and a circumference of 208 feet (63 m). The length of the circumference of the circle symbolizes the 1 square acre footprint of each tower of the World Trade Center, with a square acre being 208 feet (63 m) on each side. The circular base has an area of 3,430 square feet (319 m^{2}), which dedicates 10 square feet (0.93 m^{2}) for each of the 343 firefighters killed in the World Trade Center attack. The tops of the World Trade Center towers have 40 lights that represents the passengers and crew killed in the crash of United Airlines Flight 93, with 20 lights in each tower oriented in a circle.

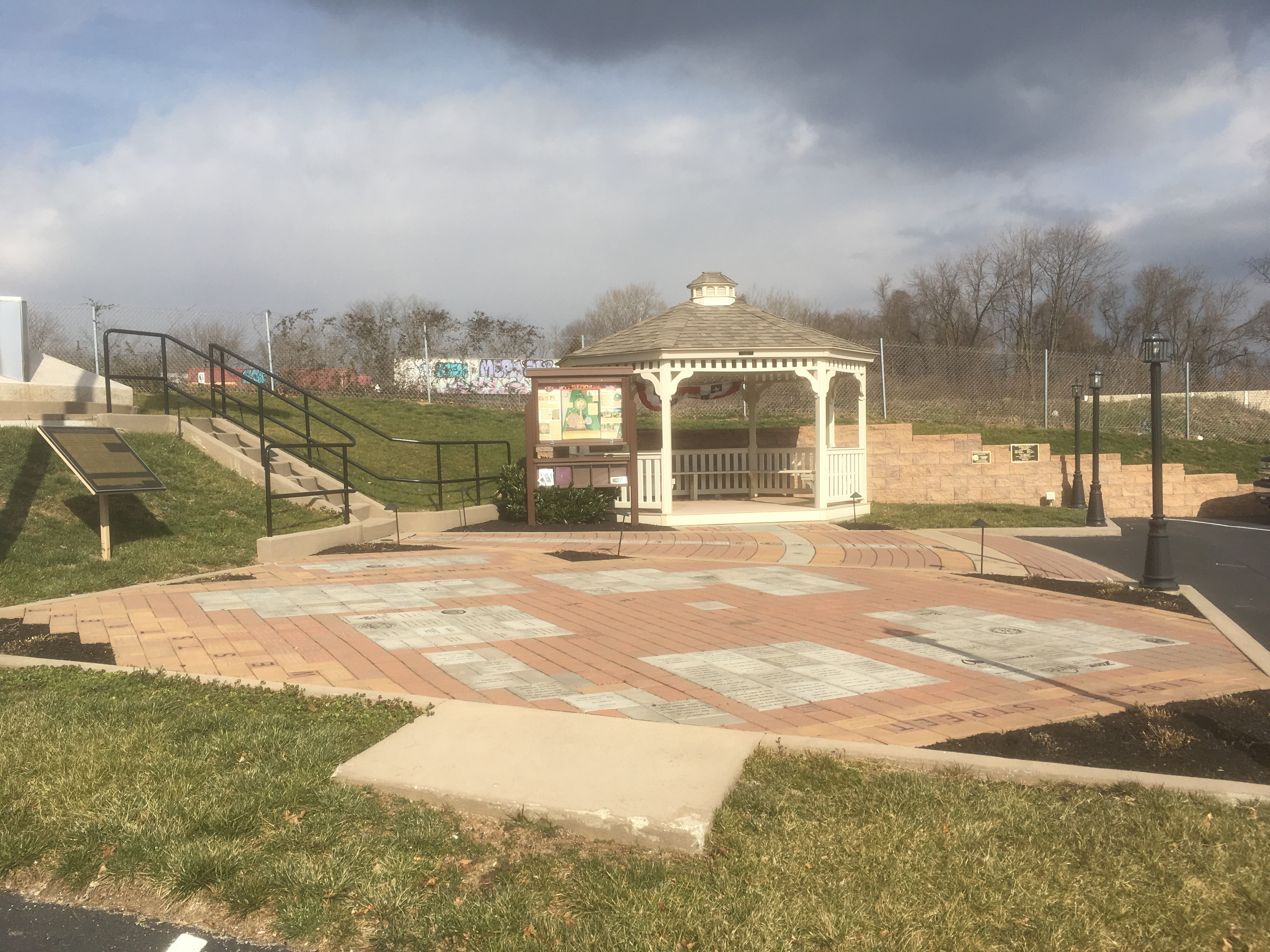
The World Trade Center Patio and the William C. Daywalt Sr. Memorial Gazebo

If one stands at the center of the World Trade Center Patio and looks directly at the center of the 9/11 Monument, the line of sight will show where American Airlines Flight 11 crashed into the far side of the North Tower of the World Trade Center and where United Airlines Flight 175 crashed into the near side of the South Tower of the World Trade Center. If one stands at the center of the William C. Daywalt Sr. Memorial Gazebo and looks directly at the center of the 9/11 Monument, the line of sight will show where American Airlines Flight 77 crashed into the far side of the Pentagon and also traces the flight bearing of United Airlines Flight 93 before it crashed in Shanksville, Pennsylvania.

== History ==
In April 2011, the King of Prussia Volunteer Fire Company received two pieces of steel from the World Trade Center to incorporate into the memorial. Construction of the 9/11 Memorial was originally planned to begin in July 2011, but was moved up a month after the death of Osama bin Laden on May 2, 2011. The memorial was designed by Charles Edwin McDonald Jr. and was constructed by Joseph J. White Jr. The 9/11 Memorial was dedicated by the King of Prussia Volunteer Fire Company on September 11, 2011, which marked the tenth anniversary of the attacks. The dedication ceremony was attended by the general public along with various local, state, and federal officials. The ceremony featured the unveiling of a custom-made motorcycle from Orange County Choppers commemorating the 10th anniversary of the September 11 attacks.

Every year, the King of Prussia Volunteer Fire Company hosts the 9/11 Memorial Run, a 5K run and 1 mile walk to remember the attacks and raise funds to support the memorial.
