= Hair Cuttery =

Hairdressing chain in the United States

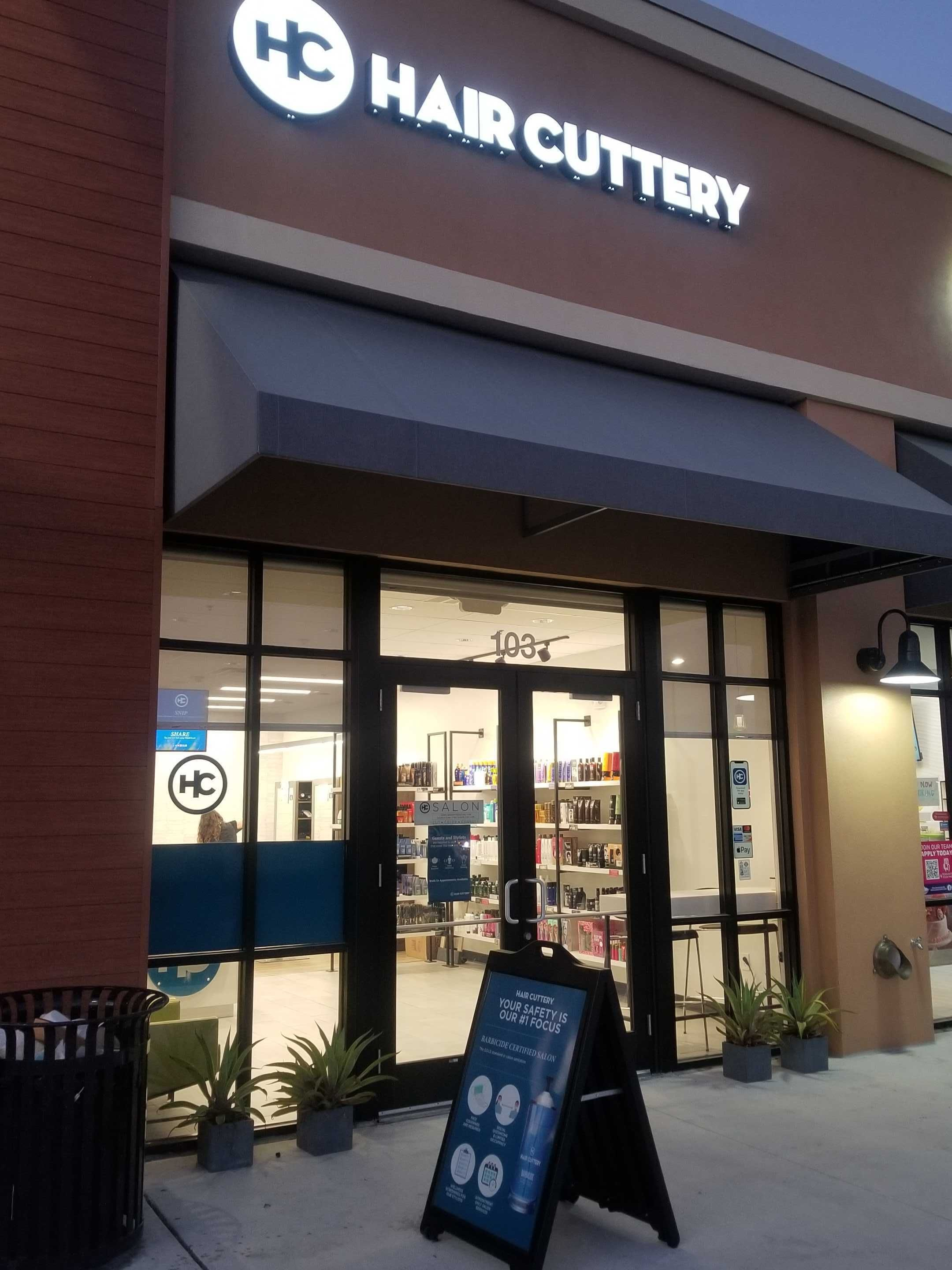
- Type: Private
- Industry: Hair salon
- Founded: 1974; 52 years ago West Springfield, Virginia, U.S.
- Founder: Dennis Ratner
- Headquarters: McLean, Virginia, U.S.
- Number of locations: 500
- Key people: Eric Bakken (CEO)
- Revenue: US$440 million (2019)
- Parent: Hair Cuttery Family of Brands
- Website: www.haircuttery.com

Hair Cuttery is an American unisex hair salon chain and the largest privately held hairdressing chain in the United States.

== History ==
Hair Cuttery was founded by Dennis Ratner in 1974, when the first salon was opened in West Springfield, Virginia. Since the 1970s, the company expanded to become the largest privately held salon chain in the United States.

As of 2021, it has more than 500 salons along the East Coast and the Midwest.

== Acquisition ==
In April 2020, the chain was acquired by debtor in possession Hair Cuttery Salon Holdings Inc, an affiliate of Tacit Salon Holdings LLC.

Hair Cuttery Salon Holdings also financed the chain's operating expenses and restored employee pay for the period preceding the acquisition, when the chain's operations were suspended due to the COVID-19 pandemic.

Hair Cuttery’s current CEO is Eric Bakken.

== Operations ==
The Hair Cuttery Family of Brands operates Hair Cuttery and Bubbles chains of salons as well as Cibu private label haircare products. Hair Cuttery operates over 500 salons and employs more than 5000 stylists.

== See also ==
- Pall Mall Barbers
