= King of Prussia, Pennsylvania =

Census-designated place in Pennsylvania, United States

- Census-designated place
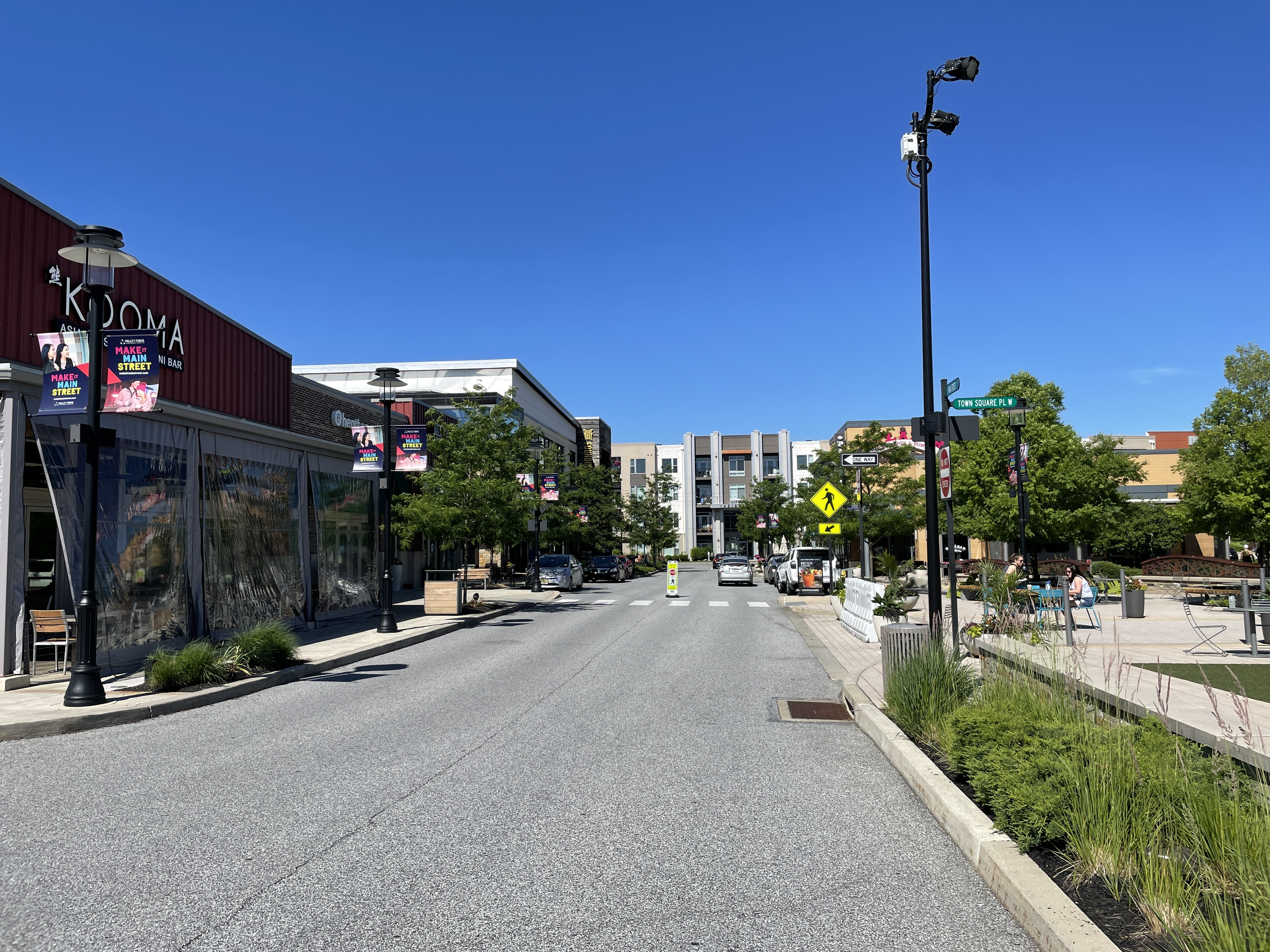
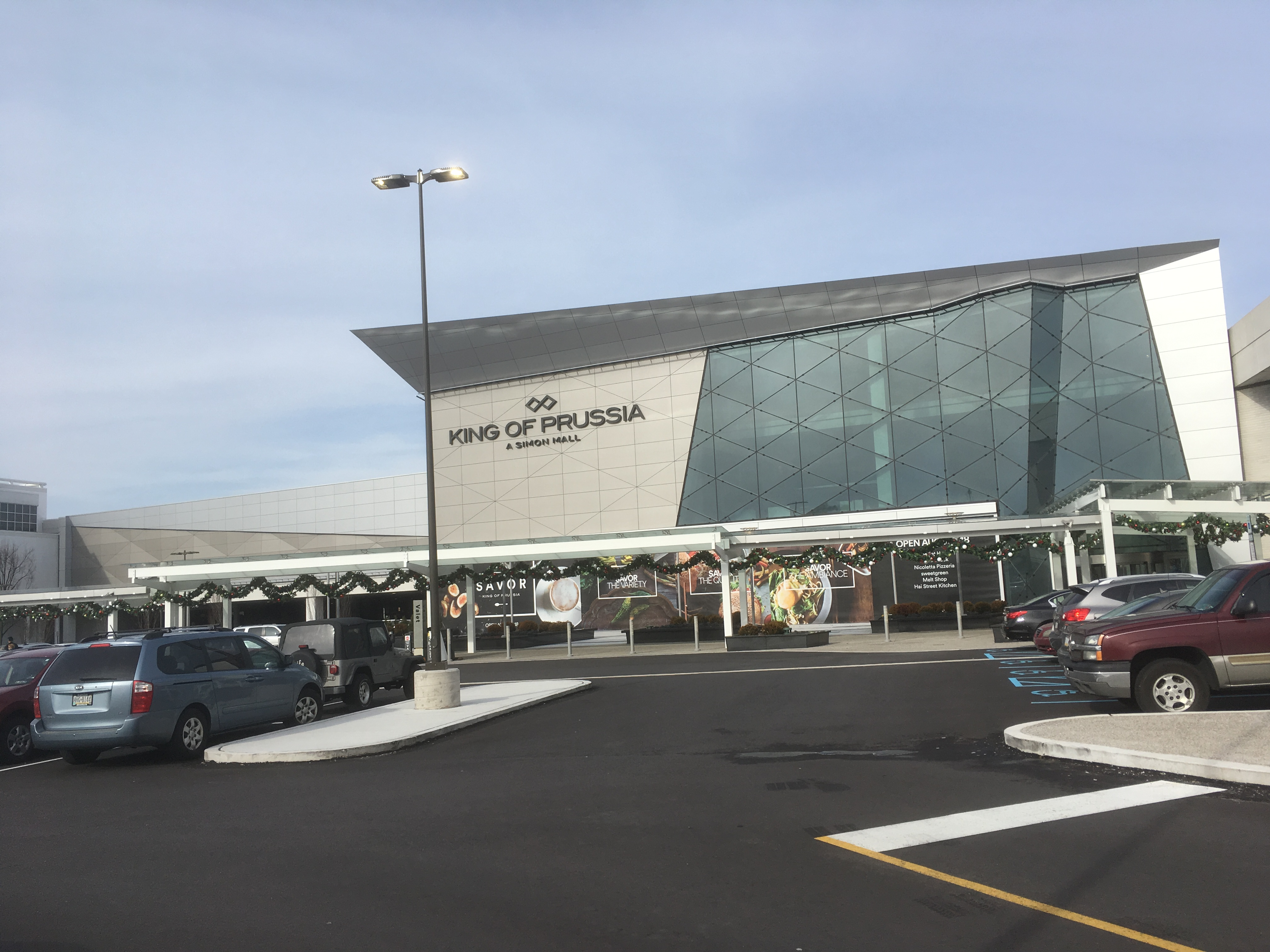
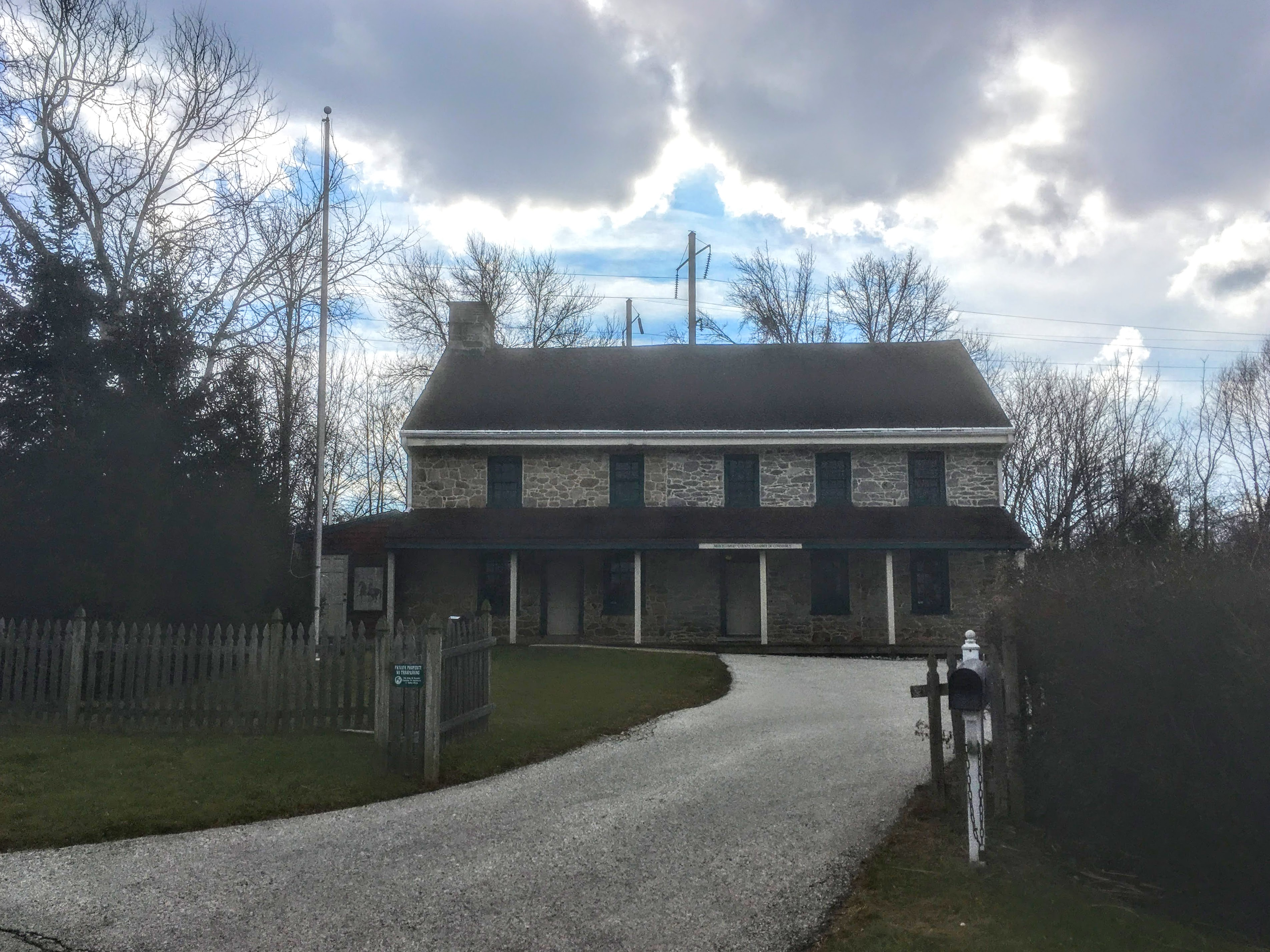
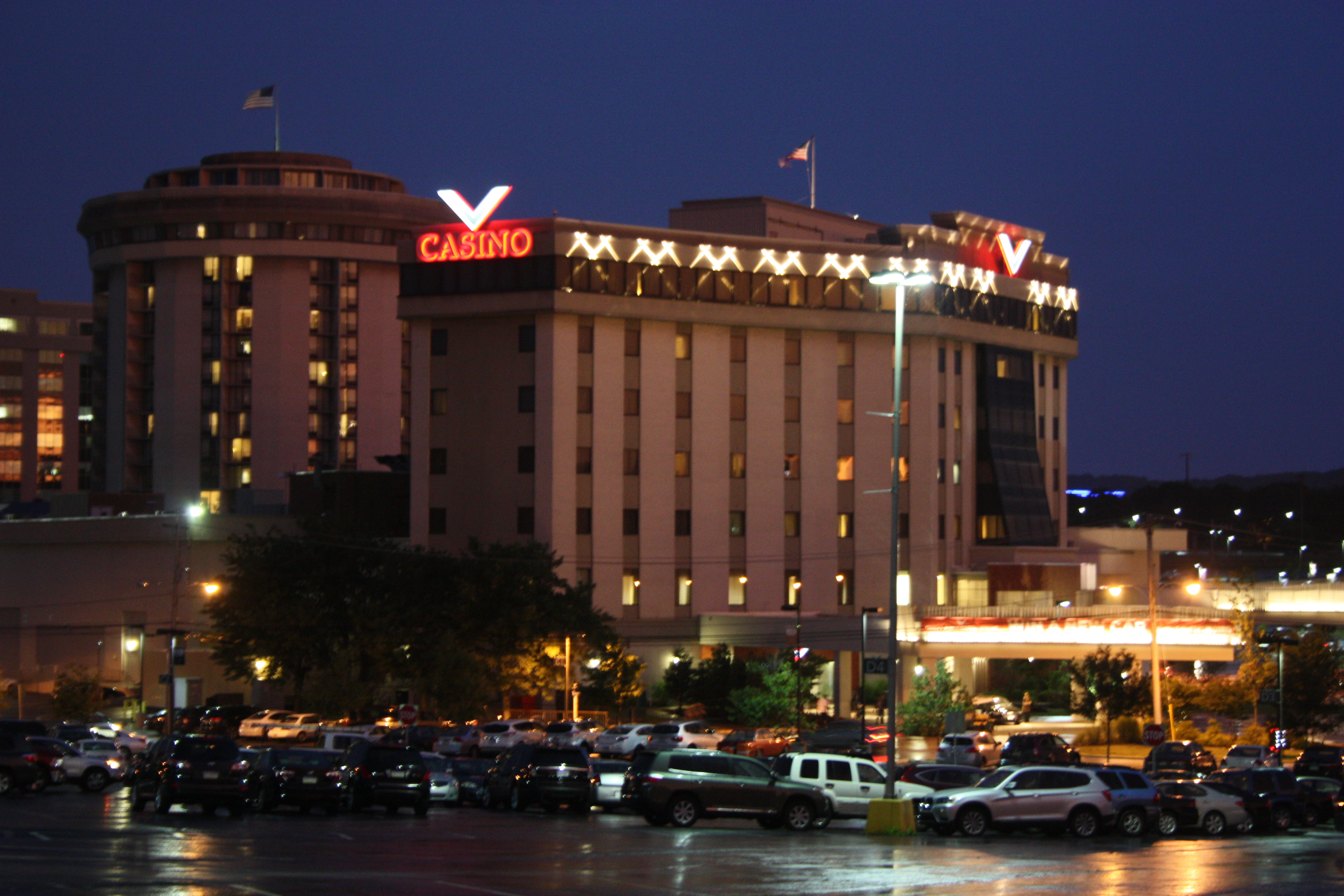
- Main Street at King of Prussia Town Center KOP sign King of Prussia Mall King of Prussia Inn, a local tavern Valley Forge Casino Resort
- Nickname: KOP
- Location within Pennsylvania Location within the United States
- Coordinates: 40°05′21″N 75°23′46″W
- Country: United States
- State: Pennsylvania
- County: Montgomery
- Township: Upper Merion
- Founded: 1719
- Named for: King of Prussia Inn

Area
  - Total: 8.66 sq mi (22.44 km^{2})
  - Land: 8.49 sq mi (22.00 km^{2})
  - Water: 0.17 sq mi (0.44 km^{2})
- Elevation: 200 ft (61 m)

Population (2020)
  - Total: 24,695
  - Density: 2,907.1/sq mi (1,122.43/km^{2})
- Time zone: UTC-5 (Eastern (EST))
  - Summer (DST): UTC-4 (EDT)
- ZIP Code: 19406
- Area codes: 610 and 484
- GNIS feature ID: 1178473

King of Prussia, sometimes abbreviated to K.O.P., is a census-designated place in Upper Merion Township in Montgomery County, Pennsylvania, United States. The community took its unusual name in the 18th century from a local tavern named the King of Prussia Inn, which was named after King Frederick the Great of Prussia. As of the 2020 census, its population was 24,695.

Located 35 miles (56 km) south of Allentown and approximately 15 miles (24 km) northwest of Philadelphia, King of Prussia is considered to be an edge city of Philadelphia and part of the larger Philadelphia metropolitan area. It is situated at the convergence of four highways and consists of large amounts of retail and office space, with one of the highest concentrations of hotels, businesses, residences, and entertainment venues in Pennsylvania.

King of Prussia is best known for its mall of the same name, the fourth-largest shopping mall in the U.S. It also hosts the headquarters of the Nuclear Regulatory Commission Region I and American Baptist Churches USA.

== History ==
The community of King of Prussia developed at the crossroads of two significant early roads, Swedesford (or Swedes Ford) Road (now U.S. Route 202) and Gulph Road, and was originally known as Reesville. The eponymous King of Prussia Inn was originally constructed at the crossroads as a cottage in 1719 by the Welsh Quakers William and Janet Rees, from whom the community took its name. The cottage was converted to an inn in 1769 and did a steady business in colonial times, as it was approximately a day's travel by horse from Philadelphia. Settlers headed west to Ohio would sleep at the inn on their first night on the road. In 1774 the Rees family hired James Berry to manage the inn, which henceforth became known as "Berry's Tavern". General George Washington first visited the tavern on Thanksgiving Day in 1777 while the Continental Army was encamped at Whitemarsh; a few weeks later Washington and the army bivouacked at nearby Valley Forge.

Parker's spy map, created by William Parker, an American Loyalist, listed the inn as "Berry's" in 1777, but a local petition in 1786 identified it as the "King of Prussia". It was possibly renamed in honor of Benjamin Franklin's pro-American satirical essay "An Edict by the King of Prussia". At some point a wooden signboard of the inn depicted King Frederick II (Frederick the Great) of Prussia. The inn is listed on the National Register of Historic Places.

=== 20th century ===
In 1935, Swedesford Road was designated as part of U.S. Route 202. In 1952, the Pennsylvania Highway Department proposed its conversion from a two-lane road to a four-lane divided highway in a plan that called for the demolition of the King of Prussia Inn. However, historic preservationists managed to prevail upon the state of Pennsylvania to avoid this important structure by building north and southbound lanes on either side of it. Today, U.S. 202 is a major north–south highway that passes through the town from southwest to northeast.

In the latter half of the 1950s, major highways were constructed near King of Prussia's central crossroads, including the Pennsylvania Turnpike just to the north and the Schuylkill Expressway just to the south, which ignited a construction boom in the region. The extensive suburban development that has taken place since the 1960s in King of Prussia has led urban planning scholars like Joel Garreau to label the area as an epitome of the edge city phenomenon, a situation where the most vibrant economic growth and prosperity in a metropolitan area (in this case, Philadelphia) no longer occurs in the urban center, but rather at its periphery. Before 1960, the Greater King of Prussia area was known for little more than being the place of Washington's winter respite in 1777-8 (see Valley Forge National Historical Park). The growth in King of Prussia developed around the convergence of four highways with the construction of the King of Prussia Mall, a large business park, and housing developments.

Daniel Berrigan and his brother Philip Berrigan began their Plowshares Movement at the General Electric Weapons Plant in King of Prussia in 1980. That event and the subsequent court proceedings surrounding the 'Plowshares Eight' were dramatically depicted by Emile de Antonio in the 1983 motion picture In the King of Prussia.

=== 21st century ===
For more than a quarter century, the King of Prussia Inn remained marooned on a median island, with motor traffic whizzing past on both sides. It was sealed up for years, surrounded by a high fence. With the further expansion of U.S. Route 202 proposed in 1997, the inn's future was once again threatened, but it was successfully relocated to a nearby site in 2000. Today, only one historic building from King of Prussia remains at its original location, the former Dr. Henry DeWitt Pawling house/Peacock Gardens at 826 W. DeKalb Pike.

By the 2000s, the business park in King of Prussia was outdated and was losing tenants. By 2009, several office building owners pushed for Upper Merion Township to improve the business park. Improvements were made to King of Prussia including landscaping the median of US 202, installing King of Prussia signs at the borders to the community, creating a shuttle service connecting the business park to nearby train stations, and changing the zoning laws to allow for apartments and townhouses to be constructed in the business park. The vacancy rates at the business park have since dropped.

In the late 1980s, developer Dennis Maloomian acquired a golf course near the King of Prussia Mall and planned a mixed-use residential and retail development that would include a town center for King of Prussia. The proposed development needed to be rezoned but Upper Merion Township officials and local residents were opposed to the plans. After several court battles, the Pennsylvania Supreme Court ruled in Maloomian's favor in 2003. The planned development became known as the Village at Valley Forge and would include a suburban downtown, apartments, townhouses, and offices. The retail area would be known as the King of Prussia Town Center. The first part of the town center was completed in 2014 with the opening of a Wegmans grocery store. This was followed by the construction of the downtown area with several stores and restaurants. Offices are being constructed and residential areas are in development.

In 2016, the two sections of the King of Prussia Mall, The Plaza, and The Court, were joined to create one large shopping mall after an expansion corridor was built.

== Geography ==
Hanging Rock on what is now PA 320 in Gulph Mills

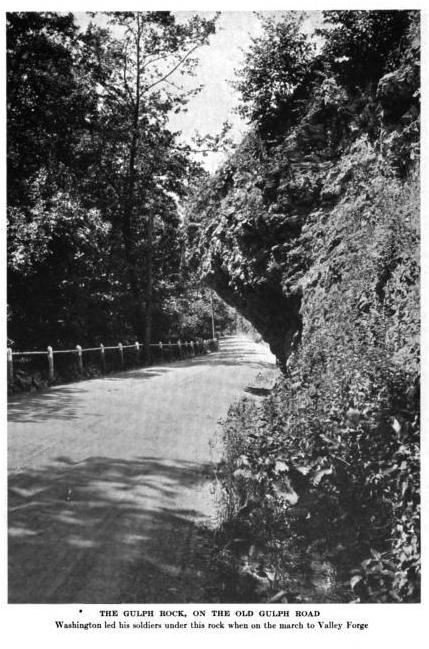
King of Prussia in 1919

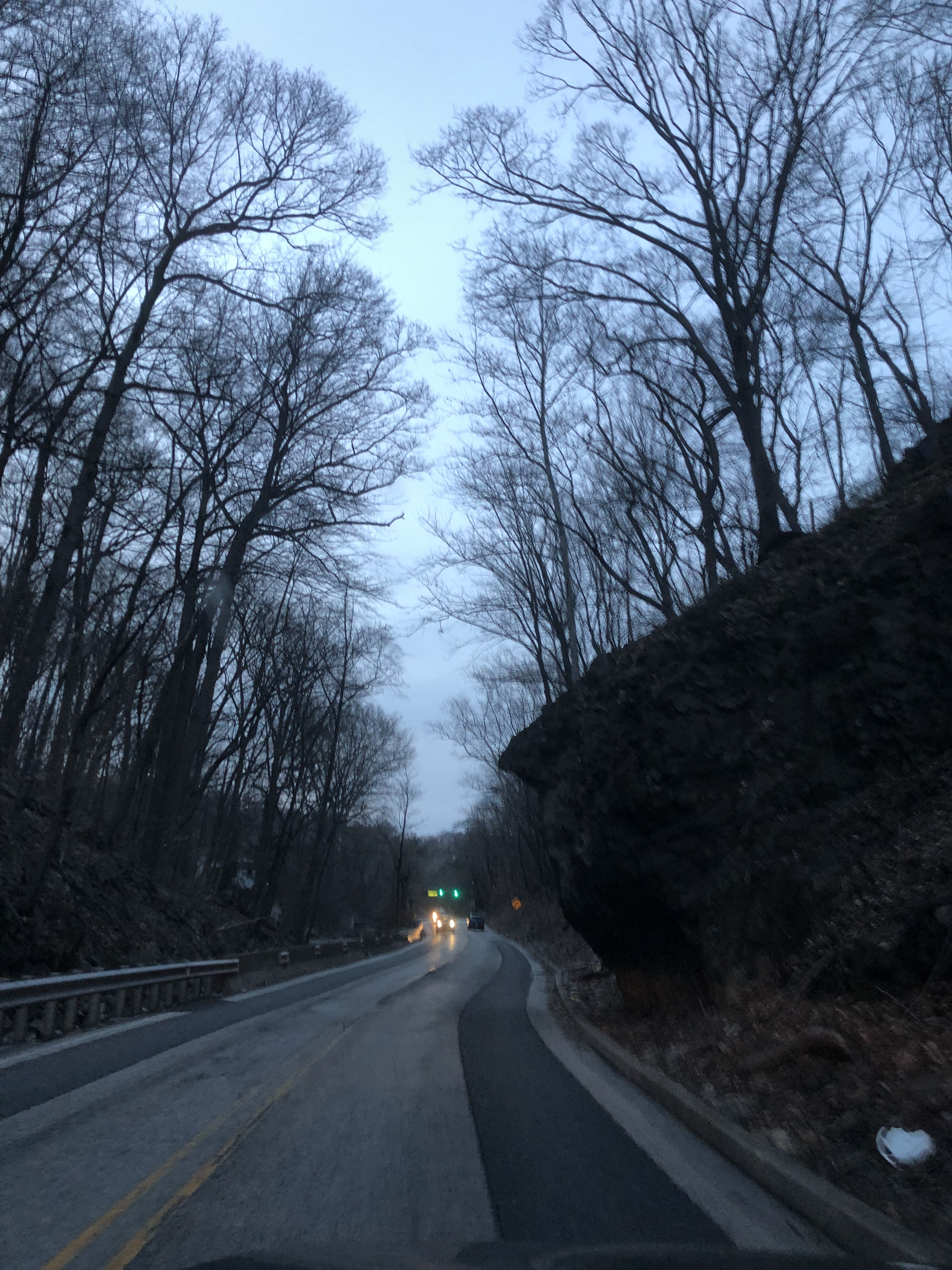
King of Prussia in 2019

There is no incorporated city of King of Prussia, although the United States Postal Service office there has carried that name since 1837. Its ZIP Code is 19406. King of Prussia's boundaries, as defined by the Census Bureau, are the Schuylkill River to the north, U.S. Route 422 to the west, Bridgeport to the east, and I-76 to the south. However, the Greater King of Prussia Area is often cited to include Bridgeport, parts of Wayne and Radnor Township, King Manor, as well as most of Gulph Mills and extreme eastern Tredyffrin Township, Chester County. The local fire department carries the King of Prussia name, whereas the police department and the school district carry the Upper Merion name. King of Prussia is located 20 miles (32 km) northwest of Philadelphia.

According to the U.S. Census Bureau, the CDP has a total area of 8.5 square miles (22 km^{2}), of which 8.4 square miles (22 km^{2}) is land and 0.1 square miles (0.26 km^{2}), or 0.83%, is water.

The area is served by area codes 610 and 484.

== Demographics ==
Historical population
Census	Pop.	Note	%±
1990	18,406		—
2000	18,511		0.6%
2010	19,936		7.7%
2020	24,695		23.9%

=== 2020 census ===
As of the 2020 census, King of Prussia had a population of 24,695. The median age was 37.2 years. 17.8% of residents were under the age of 18 and 16.2% of residents were 65 years of age or older. For every 100 females there were 100.7 males, and for every 100 females age 18 and over there were 99.8 males age 18 and over.

100.0% of residents lived in urban areas, while 0.0% lived in rural areas.

There were 11,034 households in King of Prussia, of which 23.6% had children under the age of 18 living in them. Of all households, 43.5% were married-couple households, 23.2% were households with a male householder and no spouse or partner present, and 26.0% were households with a female householder and no spouse or partner present. About 34.9% of all households were made up of individuals and 9.4% had someone living alone who was 65 years of age or older.

There were 12,272 housing units, of which 10.1% were vacant. The homeowner vacancy rate was 0.8% and the rental vacancy rate was 13.6%.

Racial composition as of the 2020 census
Race	Number	Percent
White	14,863	60.2%
Black or African American	1,881	7.6%
American Indian and Alaska Native	45	0.2%
Asian	5,782	23.4%
Native Hawaiian and Other Pacific Islander	9	0.0%
Some other race	606	2.5%
Two or more races	1,509	6.1%
Hispanic or Latino (of any race)	1,500	6.1%

=== 2010 census ===
As of the 2010 census, the CDP was 69.4% White Non-Hispanic, 5.7% Black or African American, 0.3% Native American, 18.6% Asian, and 2.1% were two or more races. 4.2% of the population were of Hispanic or Latino ancestry. 22.4% of the population was foreign-born.

=== 2000 census ===
As of the census of 2000, there were 18,511 people, 8,245 households, and 4,773 families residing in the CDP. The population density was 2,202.4 inhabitants per square mile (850.4/km^{2}). There were about 8,705 housing units at an average density of 1,035.7 per square mile (399.9/km^{2}). The racial makeup of the CDP was 82.70% White, 10.62% Asian, 4.26% Black or African American, 0.16% Native American, 0.04% Pacific Islander, 0.84% from other races, and 1.39% from two or more races. 1.91% of the population were Hispanic or Latino of any race.

There were 8,245 households, out of which 21.1% had children under the age of 18 living with them, 49.2% were married couples living together, 6.3% had a female householder with no husband present, and 42.1% were non-families. 33.1% of all households were made up of individuals, and 8.1% had someone living alone who was 65 years of age or older. The average household size was 2.22 and the average family size was 2.89.

In the CDP, the population was spread out, with 17.6% under the age of 18, 8.4% from 18 to 24, 35.1% from 25 to 44, 22.2% from 45 to 64, and 16.7% who were 65 years of age or older. The median age was 37 years. For every 100 females, there were 97.6 males. For every 100 females age 18 and over, there were 96.1 males.

The median income for a household in the CDP was $62,012, and the median income for a family was $75,882. Males had a median income of $50,803 versus $37,347 for females. The per capita income for the CDP was $32,070. 3.2% of the population and 1.6% of families were below the poverty line. 1.8% of those under the age of 18 and 2.1% of those 65 and older were living below the poverty line.

== Climate ==
The climate in this area is characterized by hot, humid summers and cool to cold winters. According to the Köppen Climate Classification system, King of Prussia had a humid continental climate, abbreviated "Dfa" on climate maps. The most recent numbers show all months averaging above freezing so that the climate is now humid subtropical (Cfa). Three months are above 22 °C (71.6 °F) and seven months are above 10 °C (50 °F). The hardiness zone is 7a bordering 7b to the east.

Climate data for King of Prussia, Pennsylvania
Month	Jan	Feb	Mar	Apr	May	Jun	Jul	Aug	Sep	Oct	Nov	Dec	Year
Record high °F (°C)	76 (24)	75 (24)	83 (28)	98 (37)	98 (37)	100 (38)	108 (42)	106 (41)	102 (39)	90 (32)	85 (29)	76 (24)	108 (42)
Mean daily maximum °F (°C)	40 (4)	44 (7)	53 (12)	64 (18)	74 (23)	83 (28)	87 (31)	86 (30)	78 (26)	67 (19)	56 (13)	45 (7)	65 (18)
Mean daily minimum °F (°C)	22 (−6)	24 (−4)	31 (−1)	41 (5)	51 (11)	61 (16)	66 (19)	64 (18)	56 (13)	44 (7)	35 (2)	27 (−3)	44 (6)
Record low °F (°C)	−12 (−24)	−5 (−21)	8 (−13)	15 (−9)	29 (−2)	28 (−2)	48 (9)	40 (4)	35 (2)	26 (−3)	14 (−10)	−10 (−23)	−12 (−24)
Average precipitation inches (mm)	3.40 (86)	3.17 (81)	4.00 (102)	4.03 (102)	4.21 (107)	3.98 (101)	4.76 (121)	4.37 (111)	4.87 (124)	3.73 (95)	3.80 (97)	4.17 (106)	48.49 (1,233)
Source: The Weather Channel

Climate data for Norristown, Pennsylvania (1991–2020 normals, extremes 1951–present)
Month	Jan	Feb	Mar	Apr	May	Jun	Jul	Aug	Sep	Oct	Nov	Dec	Year
Record high °F (°C)	76 (24)	78 (26)	84 (29)	98 (37)	98 (37)	100 (38)	108 (42)	106 (41)	102 (39)	92 (33)	85 (29)	76 (24)	108 (42)
Mean daily maximum °F (°C)	41.7 (5.4)	43.5 (6.4)	52.1 (11.2)	64.8 (18.2)	74.8 (23.8)	84.0 (28.9)	88.8 (31.6)	86.5 (30.3)	80.0 (26.7)	68.4 (20.2)	56.8 (13.8)	46.3 (7.9)	65.6 (18.7)
Daily mean °F (°C)	32.1 (0.1)	34.1 (1.2)	41.8 (5.4)	53.1 (11.7)	63.4 (17.4)	73.0 (22.8)	77.7 (25.4)	75.9 (24.4)	68.8 (20.4)	56.5 (13.6)	45.9 (7.7)	37.3 (2.9)	55.0 (12.8)
Mean daily minimum °F (°C)	22.6 (−5.2)	24.7 (−4.1)	31.6 (−0.2)	41.5 (5.3)	52.1 (11.2)	62.0 (16.7)	66.6 (19.2)	65.2 (18.4)	57.6 (14.2)	44.6 (7.0)	35.1 (1.7)	28.3 (−2.1)	44.3 (6.8)
Record low °F (°C)	−12 (−24)	−5 (−21)	8 (−13)	15 (−9)	29 (−2)	41 (5)	48 (9)	40 (4)	35 (2)	26 (−3)	14 (−10)	−10 (−23)	−12 (−24)
Average precipitation inches (mm)	3.66 (93)	2.98 (76)	4.41 (112)	3.90 (99)	4.25 (108)	4.20 (107)	4.70 (119)	4.98 (126)	4.91 (125)	4.32 (110)	3.61 (92)	4.73 (120)	50.65 (1,287)
Average snowfall inches (cm)	6.8 (17)	10.9 (28)	3.0 (7.6)	0.2 (0.51)	0.0 (0.0)	0.0 (0.0)	0.0 (0.0)	0.0 (0.0)	0.0 (0.0)	0.1 (0.25)	0.1 (0.25)	4.2 (11)	25.3 (64)
Average precipitation days (≥ 0.01 in)	11.0	9.4	11.1	12.8	14.1	11.9	10.7	10.4	8.9	11.2	9.3	10.5	131.3
Average snowy days (≥ 0.1 in)	3.3	2.9	1.6	0.1	0.0	0.0	0.0	0.0	0.0	0.1	0.1	1.4	9.5
Source: NOAA

== Economy ==
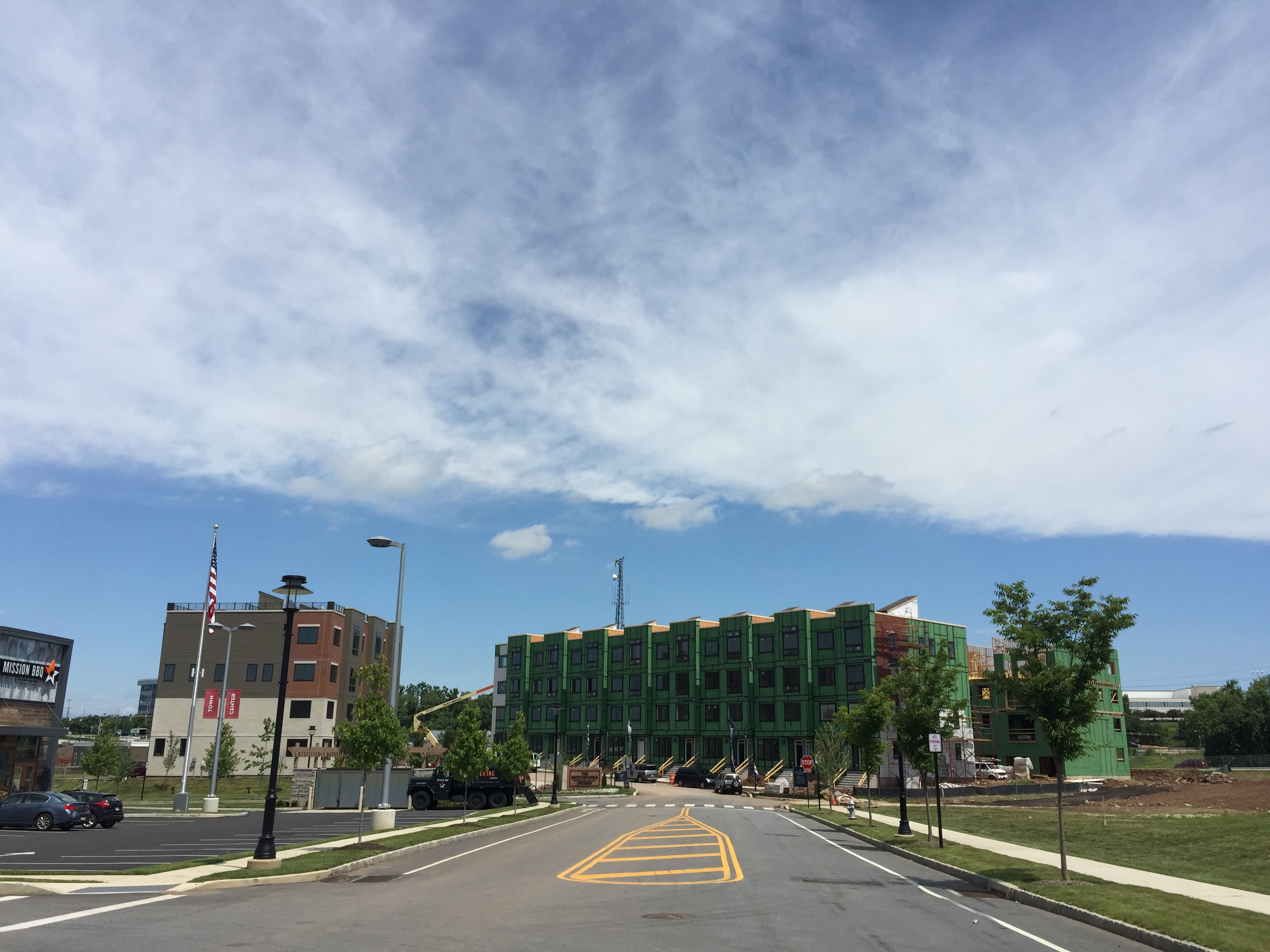
King of Prussia Town Center, which opened in 2016

King of Prussia has an unemployment rate of 4.30% and an annual job growth of about 1.44% and 38% over the next ten years. A large portion of that comes from the King of Prussia Mall, the third largest shopping complex in the United States by shopping area square footage and the numerous employers in the area. The King of Prussia Mall consists of over 450 stores, including several luxury retailers, and 8 anchor stores. The mall attracts 22 million visitors annually and produces $1.1 billion in annual sales. A large business park is located to the northwest of the King of Prussia Mall, with over 60 commercial and industrial companies on 676 acres. There are about 60,000 people employed in King of Prussia, which is three times the resident population.

King of Prussia is home to the headquarters of Nuclear Regulatory Commission Region I, which oversees 25 nuclear power reactors at 16 nuclear power plants in the Northeastern United States.

According to Upper Merion Township's 2010 Comprehensive Annual Financial Report,

#	Employer	# of Employees	Community
1	GlaxoSmithKline	2,259	King of Prussia
2	Lockheed Martin	2,255	King of Prussia
3	Valley Forge Colonial LTD	1,117	King of Prussia
4	US Liability Insurance Co.	938	King of Prussia
5	Phila. Media Newspapers Inc.	843	King of Prussia
6	Radial	742	Wayne
7	Arkema	639	King of Prussia
8	BNY Mellon Investment Servicing	638	King of Prussia
9	HIBU of PA	635	King of Prussia
10	Commonwealth of PA	574	King of Prussia

In addition, major commercial property owners in King of Prussia formed an organization in 2010 called the King of Prussia District (KOP-BID) that works to improve the physical environment, market the area, and advocate for zoning, tax and transportation policies that will keep King of Prussia competitive in the region.

== Sports ==
The Philadelphia Freedoms tennis team of World TeamTennis played in King of Prussia in 2008 and 2009. Whenever a tennis event was to occur, a temporary tennis stadium that seated 3,000 was constructed in the parking lot of the King of Prussia Mall. Eventually, the Freedoms left for The Pavilion at Villanova University in 2010.

== Education ==
=== Schools ===
Public school students in the King of Prussia area attend schools in the Upper Merion Area School District. The district is currently served by five elementary schools: Bridgeport, Caley, Candlebrook, Gulph and Roberts. Belmont Terrace Elementary School, which was built in 1958, closed as an elementary school in 1982. All students in the Upper Merion Area School District also attend Upper Merion Area Middle School and Upper Merion Area High School.

King of Prussia also has a private school, Mother Teresa Regional Catholic School. It was formed in 2012 by the merger of Mother of Divine Providence in King of Prussia and St. Teresa of Avila in West Norriton.

=== Colleges ===
The Penn State Great Valley campus was once located in King of Prussia from 1963 to 1974 before relocating to Great Valley. In 1982, the college opened up a new facility called Penn State King of Prussia Center.

== Points of interest ==
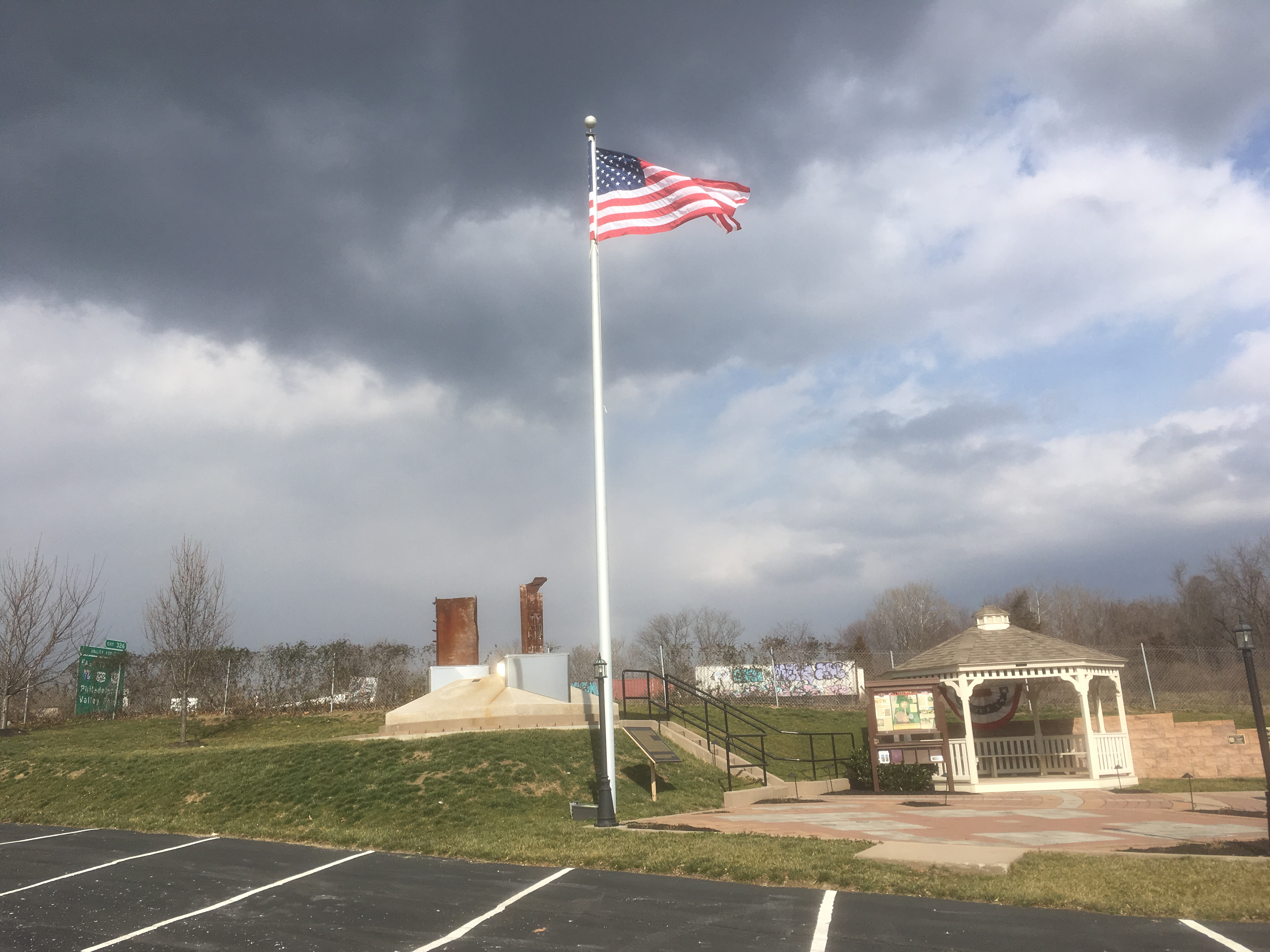
The King of Prussia Volunteer Fire Company 9/11 Memorial, a tribute to King of Prussia firemen who supported rescue efforts in the September 11 attacks

King of Prussia is home to the King of Prussia Mall, which is the third largest mall in the United States in terms of leasable space. The mall consists of over 450 stores, 8 anchor stores, and over 40 restaurants. The mall has several luxury stores that have their only Philadelphia area location in King of Prussia. The King of Prussia Mall is surrounded by several big-box stores, restaurants, hotels, and other businesses, including a United Artists Theatres and an iFLY indoor skydiving center. The King of Prussia Town Center is a lifestyle center that consists of Wegmans, multiple other big-box retailers, and a downtown area with dining, retail, and service establishments and a Town Square. The town center is part of the Village at Valley Forge, a 122-acre mixed-use development under construction that consists of retail, apartments, townhouses, condominiums, office space, and the Children's Hospital of Philadelphia's "Specialty Care and Surgery Center".

King of Prussia is also the location of the Valley Forge Casino Resort, which has over 500 hotel rooms, 600 slot machines, table games, sports betting, seven restaurants, a spa, nightlife, a convention center, and a seasonal poolside club called Valley Beach. Valley Forge National Historical Park, which consists of the site where General George Washington and the Continental Army made their encampment at Valley Forge during the winter of 1777–78 in the American Revolutionary War, is located to the west of King of Prussia.

King of Prussia is home to the King of Prussia Volunteer Fire Company 9/11 Memorial honoring the lives lost in the September 11 attacks. The memorial, which was dedicated by the King of Prussia Volunteer Fire Company on the 10th anniversary of the attacks in 2011, consists of two steel beams recovered from Ground Zero at the World Trade Center in New York City. The 9/11 Memorial is located adjacent to the King of Prussia Volunteer Fire Company station on Allendale Road across from the King of Prussia Mall.

== Infrastructure ==
=== Transportation ===
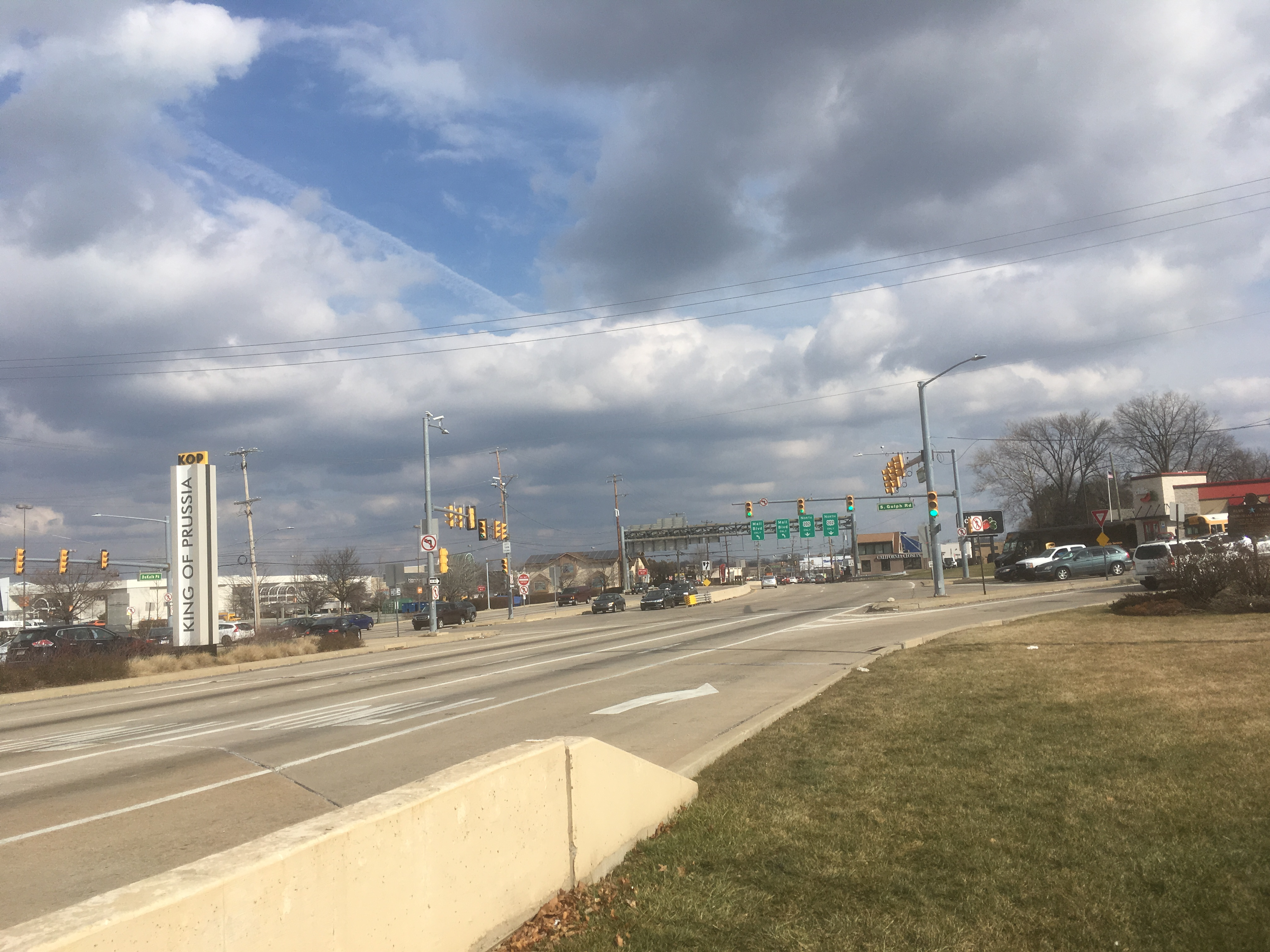
US 202 northbound entering King of Prussia at Gulph Road

King of Prussia has retained its role as an important crossroads throughout United States history. In addition to the Inn, from the earliest days, the intersection supported two general stores. Today, four major highways meet in or near the center of King of Prussia. The Schuylkill Expressway (I-76), which leads to Center City Philadelphia 19 miles (31 km) away, ends in King of Prussia at the Pennsylvania Turnpike, an east–west toll road across the southern portion of the state that heads west towards Harrisburg as part of I-76 and east across the northern suburbs of Philadelphia towards New Jersey as I-276. The US 422 freeway begins at US 202 near the center of town and heads northwest to Pottstown and Reading; thanks to reconstruction in 2003, motorists can now travel directly from Reading to Philadelphia without passing onto US 202. US 202 is the only major highway that becomes a surface road through the area, heading southwest towards West Chester as a freeway and northeast towards Norristown as Dekalb Pike, a surface road. Important local roads in King of Prussia include PA 23, which runs through King of Prussia between Valley Forge and Bridgeport along Valley Forge Road; Gulph Road, which runs from PA 23 near Valley Forge National Historical Park and heads southeast to junctions with I-76 and US 202 near the King of Prussia Mall before leading to Gulph Mills; and Henderson Road, a north–south road through King of Prussia that intersects PA 23 and US 202 before ending at Gulph Road near an interchange with I-76.

Pennsylvania Department of Transportation District 6, which serves Bucks, Chester, Delaware, Montgomery, and Philadelphia counties, is headquartered in King of Prussia.

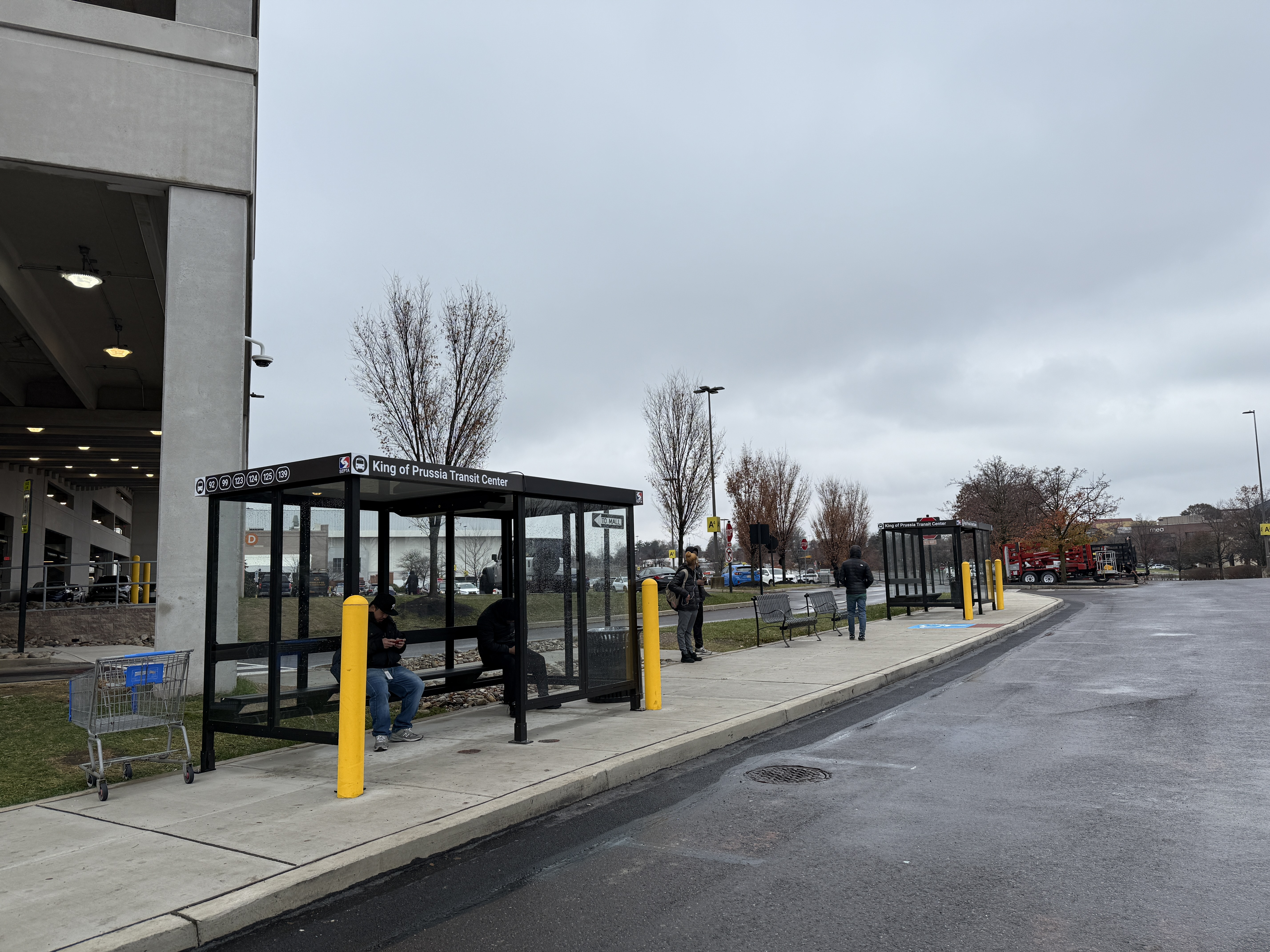
King of Prussia Transit Center at the King of Prussia Mall

King of Prussia is served by SEPTA Suburban Division bus routes 92, 99, 123, 124, 125, and 139 at the King of Prussia Transit Center at the King of Prussia Mall, with the routes providing service to West Chester, the Norristown Transportation Center, Phoenixville, the 69th Street Transportation Center, Center City Philadelphia, Chesterbrook, Valley Forge, and Limerick. In addition, SEPTA Suburban Division bus route 95 runs from Gulph Mills to the Willow Grove Park Mall in Willow Grove. The Gulph Mills station is served by SEPTA's M line, which runs between the 69th Street Transit Center and the Norristown Transit Center.

The Greater Valley Forge Transportation Management Association operates The Rambler as a community shuttle around the King of Prussia area Monday through Saturday, serving residential areas, shopping centers, the King of Prussia Mall, medical facilities, the Upper Merion Senior Center, and the Upper Merion Township Municipal Building. Taxicab and limousine service in King of Prussia is provided by three companies. Carpooling is available in King of Prussia, with the Delaware Valley Regional Planning Commission offering a service that can match commuters with transit services, carpools, vanpools, and walking and bicycling options.

OurBus provides intercity bus service from King of Prussia to Park Avenue in the Manhattan section in New York City as part of a route running from Lancaster to New York City. The bus stop in King of Prussia is located at the King of Prussia Park and Ride, a park and ride lot on King of Prussia Road. The route started on December 21, 2017. Fullington Trailways provides intercity bus service from the King of Prussia Park and Ride along a route serving Philadelphia, Harrisburg, State College, and DuBois. Greyhound Lines also has a bus stop at the King of Prussia Park and Ride.

King of Prussia is 18 miles (29 km) from 30th Street Station in Philadelphia, which has intercity rail service provided by Amtrak, and 26 miles (42 km) from Philadelphia International Airport, which has flights to domestic and international destinations.

Norfolk Southern Railway operates freight trains through King of Prussia along the Harrisburg Line that follows the Schuylkill River and the Dale Secondary that follows US 202 and the Pennsylvania Turnpike. The Abrams Yard operated by Norfolk Southern Railway is located in King of Prussia on the Harrisburg Line.

There are several trails for hiking and bicycles that serve the King of Prussia area, some of which are under development. Valley Forge National Historical Park has a network of trails that total over 20 miles (32 km), including the Joseph Plumb Martin Trail and the Chapel Trail. The Schuylkill River Trail connects Valley Forge National Historical Park via Sullivan's Bridge across the Schuylkill River to the Manayunk section of Philadelphia, following the riverbank. When complete, the Schuylkill River Trail will follow the river between Pottsville and Philadelphia for a total length of about 130 miles (210 km). A section of the Chester Valley Trail passes through King of Prussia; when complete, the trail will run 22 miles (35 km) between Norristown, where it will connect to the Schuylkill River Trail, and Exton.

=== Utilities ===
Electricity and natural gas in King of Prussia is provided by PECO Energy Company, a subsidiary of Exelon. Water in the King of Prussia area is provided by Aqua Pennsylvania, a subsidiary of Aqua America, and Pennsylvania American Water, a subsidiary of American Water. The Upper Merion Township Public Works Department provides wastewater service to King of Prussia. Trash and recycling collection in King of Prussia is provided by private haulers.

=== Health care ===
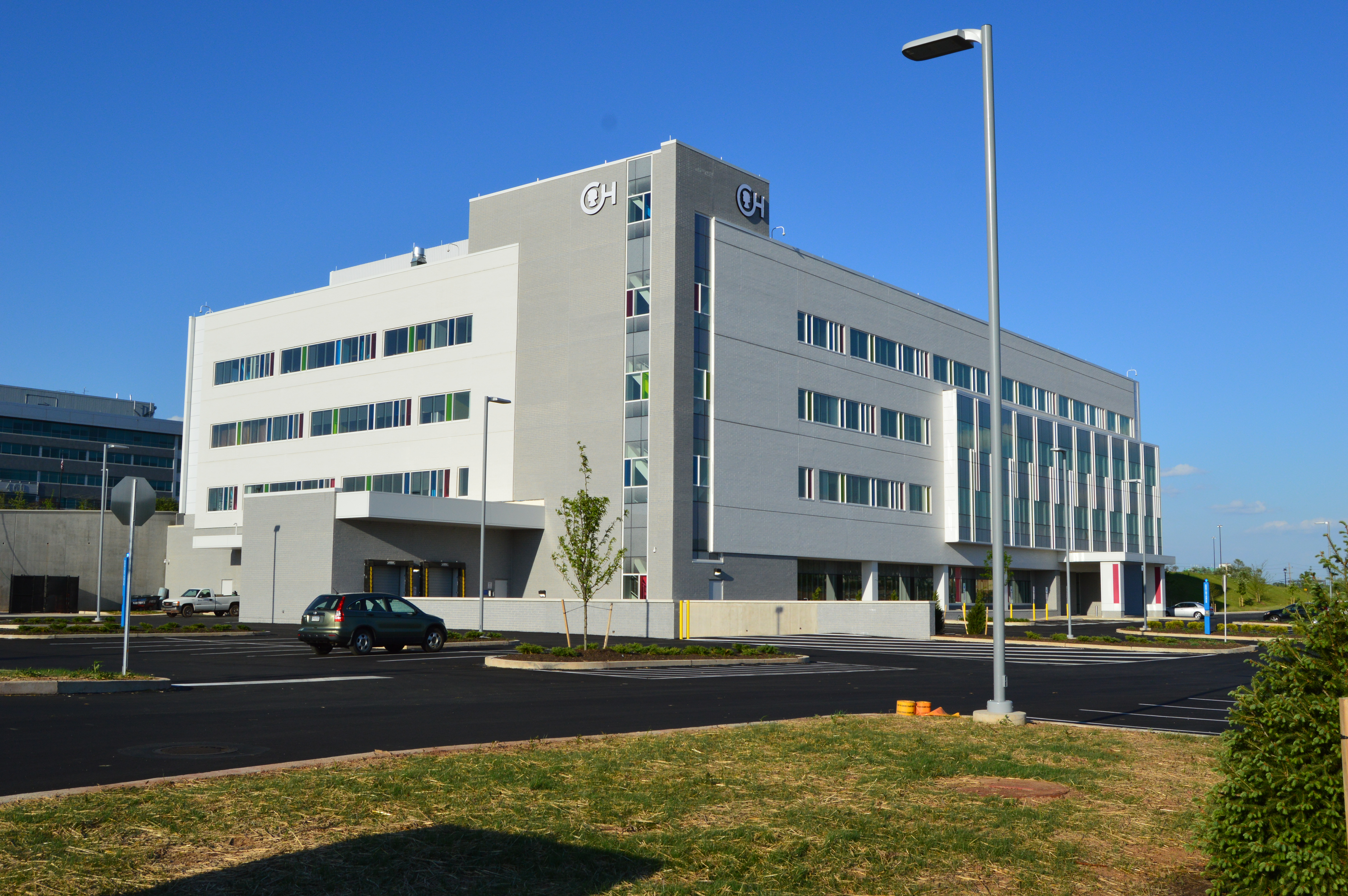
Children's Hospital facility in King of Prussia

Einstein Healthcare Network operates an outpatient healthcare facility in King of Prussia. The Children's Hospital of Philadelphia's 135,000-square-foot (13,000 m^{2}) "Specialty Care and Surgery Center" opened in King of Prussia in 2015. The Gulph Road facilities includes practices in sports medicine, oncology, and pediatric imagery. The facility is part of a larger site known the Village at Valley Forge. On January 26, 2022, the Children's Hospital of Philadelphia opened the Middleman Family Pavilion, an 250,000-square-foot (23,000 m^{2}) hospital, in King of Prussia.

== Notable people ==
- The Bloodhound Gang – A comedic rock band originating in the early '90s from King of Prussia.
- Jobriath Boone – Folk and glam rock musician and actor, and the first openly gay rock musician signed to a major record label.
- Charlie Brenneman – Mixed martial arts competitor.
- Brianna Butler – Basketball player in the Women's National Basketball League.
- William Colepaugh – American seaman who became a German spy during World War II.
- Michael J. Fitzgerald – Roman Catholic priest who is an auxiliary bishop of the Archdiocese of Philadelphia.
- Greg Gianforte – Businessman, former U.S. Representative from Montana, and Governor of Montana.
- Kathy Jordan – Professional tennis player.
- Ann Li – Tennis player.
- Bill Nuttall – Former soccer player and owner of Golden Viking Sports.
- Bob Odell – Former football halfback and coach.
- Rafael Robb – Economist and former college professor who confessed to murdering his wife.
- Jonathan Roberts – U.S. Representative and U.S. Senator from Pennsylvania in the 19th century.
- Lisa Salters – ESPN sports reporter.
- Fred Sherman – Economist, businessman, and business commentator.
- Artie Singer – Songwriter, music producer, and bandleader.
- Jay C. Smith – Former principal at Upper Merion Area High School who was convicted of murder.
- Blair Thomas – Former National Football League running back.
