= Drybar =

California-based chain of salons

DB Franchise LLC
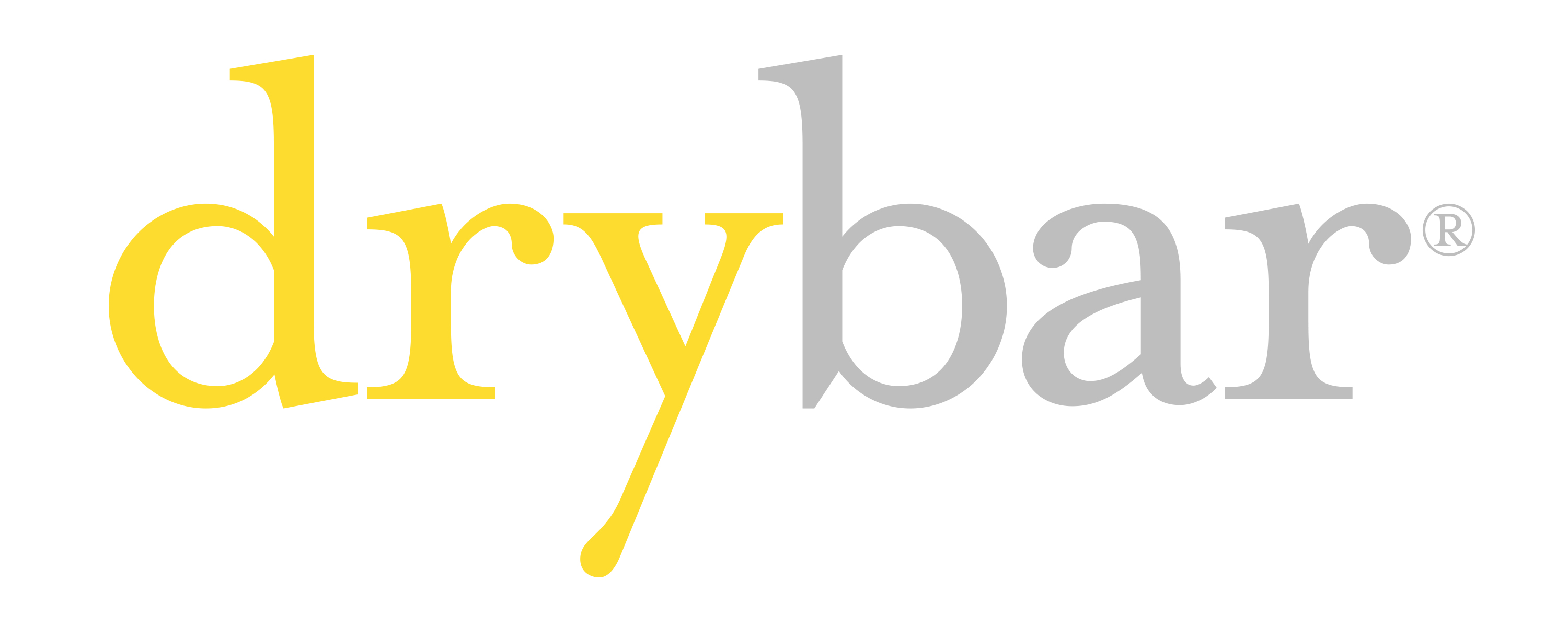

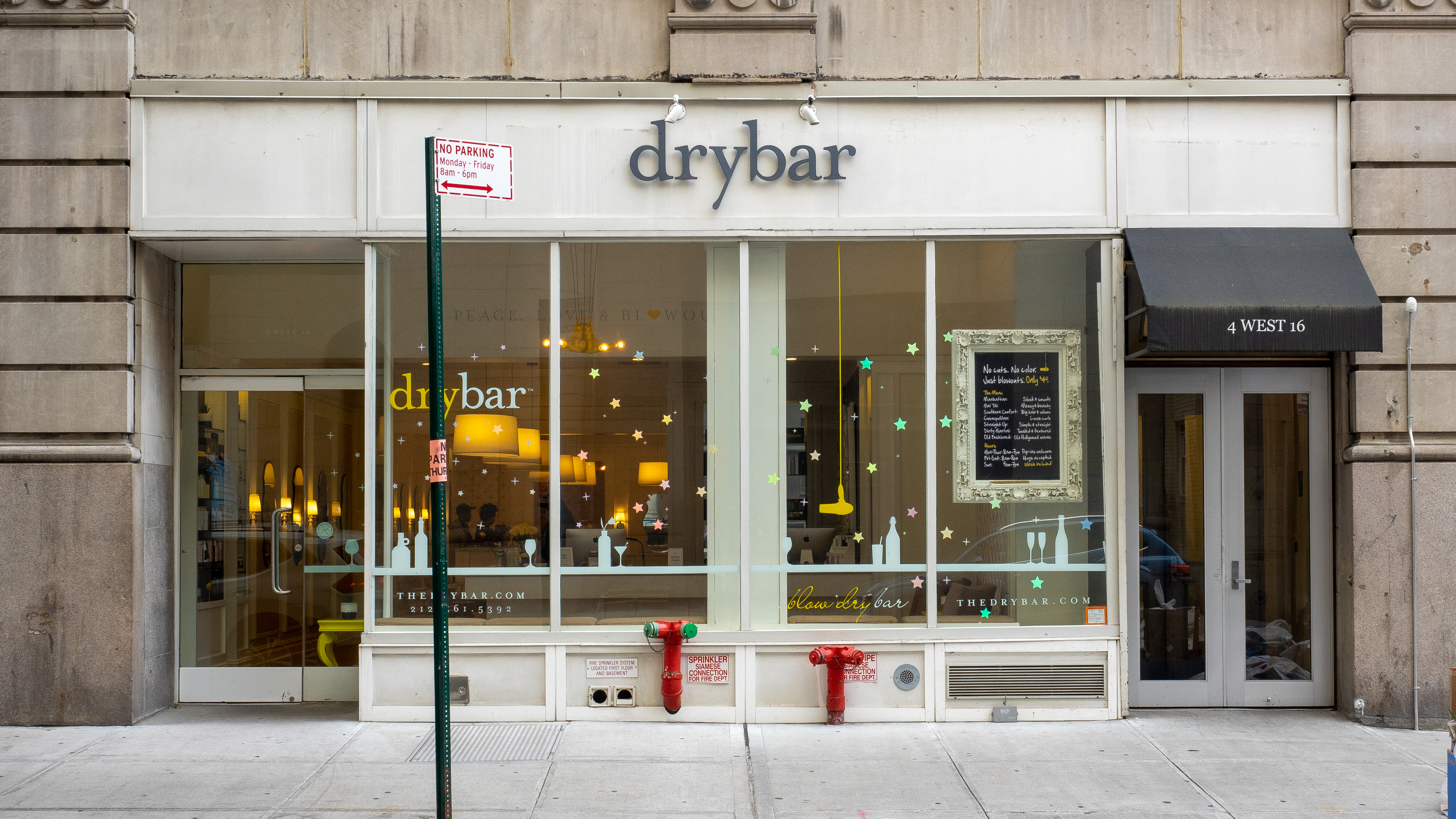
- Drybar - Flatiron, Manhattan, NYC
- Trade name: Drybar
- Founded: 2008; 18 years ago Brentwood, Los Angeles, California
- Founders: Alli Webb, Michael Landau, Cameron Webb
- Headquarters: Irvine
- Number of locations: 92
- Revenue: US$70 million (2015)
- Parent: Drybar Holdings LLC
- Website: thedrybar.com

Drybar is a California-based chain of salons that provides a hair styling service known as blowouts. The company was founded in 2010 by Alli Webb.

== History ==
In 2009, Alli Webb began a side business called Straight At Home, which provided an at-home hair experience. As demand quickly outgrew the one-woman operation, Webb noticed a "huge hole" in her local market for a business that provided solely hair blowouts, a concept that had already gained traction in larger cities such as New York City with brands like "Blo". In 2010, along with her brother Michael Landau, Alli co-founded Drybar. The following year, along with the help of friends, she raised $2.5 million to expand the business. They added Castanea Partners, a Boston-based private equity firm, to their list of investors in January 2012. Laura Mercier Cosmetics founder and former CEO Janet Gurwitch joined the company's board, as well Paul Pressler, the former president and CEO of Gap the same year.

In 2019, the American consumer goods corporation Helen of Troy acquired the Drybar trademark for $255 million in cash. In 2021, WellBiz Brands, Inc. acquired the Drybar shops' franchise rights.

== Style of business ==
Everything at Drybar is referenced using the “bar vernacular”. The cashiers are called “bartenders” and hairstyles are named after cocktails, such as the Cosmo, Mai Tai, or Manhattan. The idea behind this came from Webb. Webb’s vision is present in the designs of architect Josh Heitler. Heitler, principal of a boutique architectural firm and now a partner in the company, came up with the design elements and look of Drybar. Instead of the typical salon setup, clients at Drybar “sit facing a U-shaped or single-stretch bar, with their backs to the mirrors,” which brings to mind sitting at a bar rather than being at a salon.

== Locations ==
Drybar revenue grew from $1.5 million in 2010 to $19 million in 2012 and to $39 million in 2013. As of January 2016, Drybar had 66 locations in 11 states, Washington DC and Vancouver, British Columbia. As of November 2017, the number of locations had expanded to almost 90. As of October 2018, the company has over 100 locations and 3000 employees.

== Products ==
Looking to increase revenue, Webb (along with the help of Board member and investor Janet Gurwitch) developed a line of products specifically for Drybar.

In 2013, after testing the line in about 70 Sephora locations, Drybar went ahead with 300+ Sephora shops and QVC to launch their line of products.

The motto of Drybar is "No cuts. No color. Just wash & blowouts." which is a reference to their primary service offering.
