= Joseph A. Maturo Jr. =

American politician

Joseph Maturo Jr.

Mayor of East Haven
- In office 2011–2019
- Preceded by: April Capone Almon
- Succeeded by: Joseph Carfora
- In office 1997–2007
- Preceded by: Henry Luzzi
- Succeeded by: April Capone Almon

Personal details
- Party: Republican
- Education: Gateway Community College, University of New Haven

Military service
- Allegiance: United States
- Branch/service: United States Navy

Joseph Maturo Jr. (born circa 1951) is an American politician. He is the long-term mayor of East Haven, Connecticut. He is a Republican and with his re-election in 2005, he became the second person in East Haven history to be elected for five terms as mayor, serving 1997–2007. After two terms away, in 2011 he won re-election again, establishing a record six terms, and in 2017 was again re-elected for ninth term.

As mayor, Maturo appointed Leonard Gallo as Police Chief in 1998. In 2009 the United States Department of Justice started a civil and later criminal investigation of the police department because of complaints of harassment of Latino residents in East Haven. Mayor April Capone Almon put Gallo on administrative leave in 2010 after receiving the preliminary report by DOJ. After winning election in 2011, Maturo reinstated Gallo. The Police Chief's first action was to bar police commission members from the police headquarters and parking lot. They established a policy requiring him to give them entry. DOJ submitted its final report to the city in December 2011, documenting an abusive pattern of discrimination and harassment within the department. In January 2012 the FBI arrested four East Haven policemen on a 10-count indictment for conspiracy against civil rights and harassment of Latinos. Maturo was criticized for insensitive remarks and resisted calls for his resignation. Gallo was allowed to retire as police chief in January 2012.

In October 2012 the city under Mayor Maturo reached a settlement with DOJ on the civil charges. Two of the police officers pleaded guilty to criminal charges in 2012 in return for reduced sentences; two went to trial and were convicted in October 2013. In 2013 Maturo was re-elected as mayor. In January 2014 officer Cari was sentenced to two and a half years and officer Spaulding to five years in federal prison.

A lifelong resident of East Haven, Maturo is a master electrician, state certified as an electrical inspector.

== Early life and military career ==
Maturo is a graduate of East Haven High School, class of 1970. He served in the East Haven Volunteer Fire Company since 1969. Maturo attended South Central Community College (now called Gateway Community College) and the University of New Haven. During the Vietnam War era, Maturo served in the U.S. Navy for six years.

== Firefighter ==
Upon completing his service in the Navy, Maturo joined the professional East Haven Fire Department, established in 1972. While serving as a firefighter, Maturo was awarded three Medals of Merit. After 17 years, Maturo resigned in 1991 because of a work-related back injury. He received a disability pension valued at $3598 monthly by November 2011.

== Political career ==
Maturo joined the Republican Party and became active. He was elected to a term as a member of the town council, serving from 1993 to 1995. He lost two bids for the Connecticut House of Representatives in 1992 and 1994, in both cases losing to incumbent 99th District Democratic Representative Mike Lawlor.

=== Mayoral campaigns ===
In 1995, he ran unsuccessfully for mayor, losing to the Democratic incumbent, Hank Luzzi, in a three-way race. Luzzi won 40% of the vote to Maturo's 37% and independent candidate Ben Mazzucco's 23% of the votes.

In the general election of 1997, Maturo again challenged the incumbent Hank Luzzi. This time Maturo prevailed; he won his first election for the mayor's office with 60% of the vote.

In November 2005, Maturo ran for his fifth term against Democrat Michael DeBenedet, who ran an aggressive campaign against the incumbent. Maturo won the election with 60% of the vote. With that election, Maturo became the second East Haven mayor — and the first Republican — to win a fifth term. Democratic Mayor Anthony Proto was the first one to do so.

== Mayoral achievements ==
As mayor of East Haven, Maturo served on the South Central Regional Council of Governments (COG) in Connecticut. He served as chairman of the council from 2001 to 2003. He was appointed chief administrative officer of the State of Connecticut's Police Officer Standards and Training Council.

=== 2007 election ===
In the 2007 general election, Democrat April Capone Almon defeated Maturo by 21 votes. The slim margin of victory forced an automatic recount. On November 11, the recount showed that Almon won by 63 votes, but discrepancies in the tally resulted in a second recount. The election was certified on November 14, following a second recount. The final total showed that Almon won the election by 25 votes. She was the first woman to be elected mayor and at 32, the youngest person to gain the office.

=== 2011 election ===
In a bid to become mayor again, Maturo ran against John Finkle for the Republican nomination, where he lost. Maturo decided to run in the general election in November 2011as an independent, but switched back to Republican when Finkle withdrew from the race. The town Republican committee gave Maturo the party backing. He faced the incumbent Capone Almon. He defeated her by 31 votes, at first count. The narrow margin forced an automatic recount. After a recount completed on Saturday, November 12, 2011, Maturo won the mayor's seat with 34 votes.

When Maturo was re-elected to mayor in November 2011, at an annual salary of $75,000, the Connecticut Municipal Employee Retirement System (CMERS) cut off his disability pension, estimated at more than $40,000 annually, as Maturo was employed full-time as mayor. In its notification, the state said the law prohibited payment of such a pension to someone working full-time for a municipality covered under the law. Through his attorney, Maturo applied in January 2012 to have the disability pension reinstated. His attorney said he had received the payments through his previous ten years as mayor, and argued that the mayor's job was not covered by disability provisions.

=== Problems in police department ===
In 1998 Maturo hired Leonard Gallo as Police Chief. They have been described as close friends. There were complaints by the Latino community of discrimination by police officers.

In 2009, following the unwarranted arrest of a Catholic priest who was looking into charges that his Latino parishioners were victims of police discrimination, the United States Department of Justice initiated a civil and criminal investigation into conduct in the department. Based on DOJ's preliminary report received by the city in 2010, then Mayor Capone Almon (elected in November 2009) put Gallo on administrative leave until the investigations were completed. Authorities later said "Mr. Gallo interfered with the federal investigation, and threatened officers who cooperated with it."

After his election to mayor in November 2011, Maturo was reportedly briefed about the federal investigation but returned Gallo to his post as police chief. On his first day back, Gallo barred police commission members from police headquarters and the parking lot; they were trying to investigate the conduct of Sgt. John Miller, about whom they had received complaints. Days later commission members established a policy requiring their entry to police headquarters.

In December 2011, DOJ submitted its final scathing report of the civil investigation to the city, concluding that the department had a pattern of "systematically discriminating against Latinos." It described the discriminatory treatment as "deeply rooted in the department's culture."

Based on a ten-count indictment, on January 24, 2012, four local policemen: Sgt. John Miller, Dennis Spaulding, Jason Zullo, and David Cari were arrested by the FBI, indicted on 10 counts under DOJ's criminal investigation on charges of having beaten, improperly searched, and racially harassed Latino members of the community. The police, known as "Miller's boys," were described by the FBI's Janice K. Fedarcyk, assistant director-in-charge of the New York office, as having "routinely deprived East Haven residents of their civil rights," and as "bullies with badges." Each officer was charged with "conspiracy against rights", as well as other charges. They were released on bail, Zullo to home confinement. Both he and Spaulding, who was released after posting $300,000 bail, were prohibited from going into East Haven or having contact with other defendants and officers until their cases were resolved.

Mayor Maturo said, "I don't believe these charges at all." and "We stand behind our officers and the police department.." He said the four officers were put on administrative leave, with pay, pending an internal investigation. The union also expressed support. An editorial in the Hartford Courant strongly criticized the mayor for appearing blind to racism in the police following the officers' indictment, noting a previous incident resulting in a major settlement by the city in 2003.

The day of the arrests, when Maturo was asked by a reporter what he was planning to do for the Latino community that night, he replied, "I might have tacos when I go home." His comment provoked much criticism, from the governor of Connecticut, the mayor of Hartford, the NAACP, immigration groups and others as insensitive to his community, where residents have been documented as having suffered at the hands of the town police department. Leonard Gallo was allowed to resign as police chief by January 30, 2012.

The day following Maturo's remarks, the Junta For Progressive Action, an immigration reform group, delivered 500 tacos to the mayor's office, noting that most Latino residents in East Haven were from Ecuador, not Mexico, and had traditional foods other than tacos. Maturo later apologized for his comments and emphasized the desire for healing of the city. The tacos were donated to area food banks. That week, Maturo chose a Puerto Rican to sit on the city commission looking into police issues. Under pressure to resign, Maturo said he would stay on as mayor and improve the city.

On October 23, 2012, the Associated Press reported that the city had reached a settlement with the DOJ on its "claims that officers engaged in a pattern of discrimination and abuse toward Latinos." The settlement required the city to end racial profiling and undertake other actions to improve conditions.

Miller and Zullo pleaded guilty in 2012 plea bargaining. Cari and Spaulding were convicted at trial in October 2013. In November 2013, Maturo was re-elected as mayor. In January 2014 Cari was sentenced to two and a half years in prison. Spaulding was sentenced to five years in prison and continued to insist he had done nothing wrong.

Based on a separate civil suit filed by Latino residents in 2010, the city reached a settlement in June 2014 to pay $450,000 to Latinos and change immigration enforcement, separating it from other police actions. The city "will no longer detain undocumented people for immigration authorities unless they have a judge-signed criminal warrant." The city admitted no wrongdoing.

A separate incident occurred under Maturo's watch in January 2013, when East Haven police officers removed a woman 8 months pregnant from her car at gunpoint and detained her. It was eventually determined that she "was not involved in the underlying incident which brought about her interaction with East Haven officers that day." Litigation filed by the ACLU of Connecticut on the woman's behalf led to the town paying a $55,000 settlement while admitting no wrongdoing. One police officer was criminally charged in the incident.

== Sexual harassment case ==
As of 2015, Maturo is facing a Sexual Harassment complaint from a former employee, Francine Carbone. Allegedly, she was harassed from the beginning of her employment in 1997 all the way to May 2014, when she went on leave. In September 2018, the case was settled out of court with an agreement that the town would pay Carbone $175,000 plus the benefits she would have received until retirement.

== 2015 Mayoral Campaign ==
Maturo endorsed a plan for 200 Tyler Street that had been put forth by his competitor in the 2015 East Haven CT Mayoral race, Michael Speer. Maturo went on to win the election. The front half of the 200 Tyler Street property was sold to WinnCompanies, who began work to renovate the building to create a mixed income senior living facility. The remaining section of the school is to be developed into a community center.

== Maturo election results ==
- 2017 Joseph Maturo (R) 3,649 - Sal Maltese (D) 3,543
- 2015 Joseph Maturo (R) 3,232 - Michael Speer (D) 1,779 - Sal Maltese (I) 2,093
- 2013 Joseph Maturo (R) 3,963 - Jack Stacey (D) 3,376 - Adam Christoferson (I) 166 - Oni Sioson (W) 33
- 2011 Joseph Maturo (R) 4,033 - April Capone Almon (D) 3,999 - Oni Sioson (W) 70
- 2007 April Capone Almon (D) 4,010 - Joseph Maturo (R) 3,985
- 2005 Joseph Maturo (R) 4,386 - Michael DeBenedet (D) 2,897
- 2003 Joseph Maturo (R) 4,740 - Marilyn M. Vitale (D) 2,475
- 2001 Joseph Maturo (R) 5,596 - Norman DeMartino (D) 2,593
- 1999 Joseph Maturo (R) 5,647 - Fred A. Marotti (D) 1,720
- 1997 Joseph Maturo (R) 5,699 - Hank Luzzi (D) 3,913
- 1995 Hank Luzzi (D) ???? - Joseph Maturo (R) ???? - Ben Mazzucco (I) ????

== Other civic activities ==
Maturo is a member of the Vietnam Veterans of America, Post # 484; a member of the American Legion, Post # 89; and a charter member of the East Haven Lions Club. He has served on the Public Relations Committee of the 1995 Special Olympics World Games held in New Haven. He has also served as a substitute teacher in the East Haven Public Schools and has served as a legislative clerk in the Connecticut General Assembly.

== Awards ==
- 2004, awarded Man of the Year by the St. Jude Connecticut Network, Connecticut's fundraising entity for St. Jude's Children's Research Hospital.
- 2005, the 42nd Oak Street Reunion gave Maturo the Man of the Year Award.

Political offices
Preceded by Henry Luzzi	Mayor of East Haven, CT; 1997–2007	Succeeded by April Capone Almon
Preceded by April Capone Almon	Mayor of East Haven, CT; 2011 – 2019	Succeeded by Joseph Carfora
