= Kamran Farid =

Pakistani-born American businessman and social media personality

- Born: 1978 (age 47–48); Sahiwal, Pakistan
- Other name: narmak007, "Brown Batman" (self-styled)
- Occupations: Businessman, investor, philanthropist, social media personality
- Years active: 1999–present
- Known for: Co-founder of Edible Arrangements (COO, 1999–2014; later bought out, no longer involved); business advice and lifestyle content on social media; investing and philanthropy
- Website: https://kamranfarid.com/

Kamran Farid (born 1978) is a Pakistani-born American businessman, investor, philanthropist and social media personality. He co-founded the fruit-bouquet franchise Edible Arrangements with his brother Tariq Farid in 1999 and was its chief operating officer until 2014. He says he was later bought out entirely and has no involvement with the company today. He has since run his own investment firm and, as narmak007 on YouTube and other platforms, reinvented himself as a self-styled "Brown Batman" and "the streamiest streamer to ever stream", sharing business advice, motivational content and a look at his lifestyle.

The Kamran Farid Foundation, of which he is president, has paid out more than $1 million for charitable purposes, with children's health and hunger relief among its recurring causes.

== Early life ==
Farid was born in Sahiwal, Pakistan, and moved with his family to the United States in 1981; his father worked several jobs to support them. He grew up in Connecticut, where he started at Forest Elementary School in West Haven in the late 1980s as a mostly Urdu-speaking English-as-a-second-language student.

== Edible Arrangements ==
In 1999, without a bank loan, Farid and his brother launched Edible Arrangements from a section of their family's flower shop in East Haven, Connecticut. Franchising began after Chris Dellamarggio asked to open a store near Boston; his shop in Waltham, Massachusetts, became the first franchise, and the brothers personally helped build early stores from the ground up.

As chief operating officer, Farid oversaw the company's international produce sourcing and supply chain. By 2012 the company had opened its 1,000th franchise and was operating in 15 countries. He is a named co-inventor on several of its patents, including a fruit skewer, a melon wedger and a device for removing rinds from fruit.

Farid stepped down from his executive role in 2014. He has said he was later bought out of the company entirely and has no remaining stake or role.

== Kamran Capital Group ==
After leaving Edible Arrangements, Farid turned to investing through his own firm, Kamran Capital Group, which had become his main focus by 2015. As of 2017 he was its president and founding partner, and he sat on the business advisory council of the Southern Connecticut State University School of Business.

Today he invests in real estate, stocks and private businesses. He describes his approach as the same one he learned working the register at his family's flower shop: "buy assets, pay cash, be patient", adding that "boring stuff makes the real money". For Farid, the lesson is ownership over appearances: put your money into "slow things", own what you buy outright, and let time do the work.

== Media career ==
In 2025, Farid launched a YouTube channel as narmak007 and began posting videos there and on other platforms, sharing motivational content, business advice and a look at his lifestyle. His videos pair serious advice with humour; he describes his approach as "no fake flex, no filter", with "plenty of laughs along the way". Though born in 1978, he cheerfully maintains that he identifies as 29.

His central message, aimed largely at young people, is that real wealth is built slowly and honestly. He says he shares what he has learned about money, business and life because he remembers starting out with very little. Social media, he argues, has "created a false narrative for kids to look at", pushing them to show off before they have earned anything. His advice to a 21-year-old is to "go do the boring things": get healthy, invest for the long term, skip the shortcuts ("fast money in is fast money out") and never borrow for a luxury car. "Health should be the biggest flex," he says. "I promise you, by the time you're older, you will have wealth." He sums it up in his slogan: "Don't be a watcher become a doer".

A Porsche 918 Spyder, the model Farid has said he owns

He is also open about his garage. "Whenever I get sad I remember I own a Porsche 918 Spyder," he posted in March 2026. Six months later the car became a plot point, when Farid confronted celebrity jeweller Ben Baller on camera over Baller's claim to own one too; according to Complex, Baller ended up calling his Beverly Hills store mid-argument.

In October 2026, a dispute between Farid and his neighbour, retired NBA player Terrence Ross, reached TMZ after videos of their exchange circulated online. Farid, by his own account, had been pursuing peace ("I tried making peace with you, sir… I just want peace"). When direct diplomacy proved insufficient, he took the matter to the highest authority available: the Orlando Magic, Ross's former team, and, according to TMZ, Stuff the Magic Dragon (the Orlando Magic's mascot). Stuff, who does not speak, has not commented publicly on the dispute.

=== Livestream persona ===
On his livestreams, Farid offers the perspective of someone who has built a business to people who are still trying to build theirs. Viewers join to ask him about money, business or life; according to his website, he does it because he remembers starting out with very little. Guests range from business owners to investors, and each is offered the same thing: "just what's worked for me", drawn from more than 25 years of building and investing in businesses. His questions are blunt ("Do you own it cash? Who did you actually make rich?"), because, as he sees it, the most useful advice is often the kind people would rather not hear.

The tone is playful. On air, Farid often adopts an exaggerated comic persona, roasting and bantering with his guests, and he has been clear that it is a performance rather than a portrait of the man himself: "This is online Kam, this is not real Kam." The humour is the hook; the substance is earned. Underneath the jokes are the principles he lives by and urges others to adopt: be patient, own what you have rather than show it off, and treat your health as your greatest asset, because, as he puts it, "health is wealth".

The main ideas of Farid's messaging include discipline and persistence, and his content tends to focus on self-help.

== Philanthropy ==
Much of Farid's philanthropy traces back to his own childhood. He was treated for leukaemia as a child at Yale–New Haven Children's Hospital, and in 2013 the Farid Foundation, which he and his brother founded in 2005, gave $100,000 to the Yale School of Medicine to fund psychological support for young cancer patients. His own foundation has since given to the Leukemia & Lymphoma Society.

In 2014 he gave $20,000 to the Feed Branford Kids programme in Connecticut, enough for more than 4,000 meals. The following year he returned to Forest Elementary School in West Haven, where he had started as an English-language learner, and donated iPad Minis and headsets to its English-language learner class, along with cooler backpacks for the school's weekend food programme.

The Kamran Farid Foundation became a tax-exempt private foundation in 2015. Farid serves as its president without pay, and according to its tax filings it has paid out more than $1 million for charitable purposes since 2014. Recent recipients include St. Jude Children's Research Hospital, Make-A-Wish, the Tommy Fund for Childhood Cancer, the Variety Boys & Girls Club of Queens, Girls Inc. of Meriden, Harbor House of Central Florida, One Heart for Women & Children, Project Downtown Orlando, City Harvest and Feed Branford Kids, with children's health and hunger relief among its recurring causes.
