= Joseph Zullo =

American politician

Member of the Connecticut House of Representatives from the 99th district
- Incumbent
- Assumed office March 1, 2019
- Preceded by: James Albis

Personal details
- Born: 1985 (age 40–41)
- Party: Republican
- Education: Providence College (BS); Quinnipiac University (JD)

Joseph Zullo (born 1985) is an American Republican Party politician currently serving as a member of the Connecticut House of Representatives from the 99th district, which includes part of East Haven, since 2019. Zullo was first elected to the seat in 2019 after a special election victory over Democrat Josh Balter. He was re-elected in 2020 over Democrat David Yaccarino Jr. Zullo currently serves on the House Housing Committee, Planning and Development Committee, and the Finance, Revenue, and Bonding Committee. On January 20, 2022, Zullo announced that he would seek re-election in the upcoming elections.
