= Connecticut's 99th House of Representatives district =

American legislative district

Connecticut's 99th State House of Representatives district
Representative
Joseph Zullo; R

Connecticut's 99th House of Representatives district elects one member of the Connecticut House of Representatives. It encompasses parts of East Haven and has been represented by Republican Joseph Zullo since 2019.

== List of representatives ==
List of representatives from Connecticut's 99th State House district
Representative	Party	Years	District home	Note
Ralph L. Earle	Republican	1967–1971	North Haven	Seat created
Albert W. Cretella Jr.	Republican	1971–1973	North Haven	
Mark S. DeFrancesco	Republican	1973–1975	East Haven	
John A. Giordano Jr.	Democratic	1975–1981	East Haven	
Paul Karbowski	Republican	1981–1987	East Haven	
Mike Lawlor	Democratic	1987–2013	East Haven	
James Albis	Democratic	2013–2019	East Haven	Resigned after appointed to the Department of Energy and Environmental Protection by Governor Ned Lamont
Joseph Zullo	Republican	2019–	East Haven	Elected in special election

== Recent elections ==
=== 2020 ===
2020 Connecticut State House of Representatives election, District 99
Party	Candidate	Votes	%
Republican	Joe Zullo (incumbent)	6,364	55.00
Democratic	Dave Yaccarino	4,551	39.33
Independent Party	Joe Zullo (incumbent)	411	3.55
Working Families	Dave Yaccarino	244	2.11
Total votes		11,570	100.00
Republican hold			

=== 2018 ===
2018 Connecticut House of Representatives election, District 99
Party	Candidate	Votes	%
Democratic	James Albis (Incumbent)	4,886	58.2
Republican	Robert Parente	3,514	41.8
Total votes		8,400	100.00
Democratic hold			

=== 2016 ===
2016 Connecticut House of Representatives election, District 99
Party	Candidate	Votes	%
Democratic	James Albis (Incumbent)	5,006	50.05
Republican	Steve Tracy	4,995	49.95
Total votes		10,001	100.00
Democratic hold			

=== 2014 ===
2014 Connecticut House of Representatives election, District 99
Party	Candidate	Votes	%
Democratic	James Albis (Incumbent)	3,876	59.2
Republican	Stacy Gravino	2,137	32.6
Working Families	James Albis (Incumbent)	343	5.2
Independent Party	James Albis (Incumbent)	190	2.9
Total votes		6,546	100.00
Democratic hold			

=== 2012 ===
2012 Connecticut House of Representatives election, District 99
Party	Candidate	Votes	%
Democratic	James Albis (Incumbent)	5,904	68.5
Republican	Craig Cubellotii	2,719	31.5
Total votes		8,623	100.00
Democratic hold			
