= Mark S. DeFrancesco =

American politician (1949–2026)

Member of the Connecticut House of Representatives from the 99th district
- In office 1973–1975
- Preceded by: Albert W. Cretella Jr.
- Succeeded by: John A. Giordano Jr.

Personal details
- Born: December 16, 1949 New Haven, Connecticut, U.S.
- Died: August 26, 2026 (aged 76) Cheshire, Connecticut, U.S.
- Party: Republican
- Spouse: Helen DeFrancesco (m. 1984)
- Education: Yale University; University of New Haven

Mark S. DeFrancesco (December 16, 1949 – August 26, 2026) was an American politician. A member of the Republican Party, he served in the Connecticut House of Representatives from 1973 to 1975.

== Early life and career ==
DeFrancesco was born on December 16, 1949 in New Haven, Connecticut, and was raised in East Haven, Connecticut. At an early age, he worked as a paperboy. He attended Notre Dame High School, graduating in 1967. He also attended Yale University, graduating in 1971.

He served in the Connecticut House of Representatives from 1973 to 1975. After his service in the House, he attended UConn Medical School, and specialized in obstetrics and gynecology. He also attended the University of New Haven, earning his MBA degree in 1997.

== Personal life and death ==
In 1984, DeFrancesco married Helen, a delivery nurse. Their marriage lasted until DeFrancesco's death in 2026.

DeFrancesco died in Cheshire, Connecticut on August 26, 2026, at the age of 76.
