= Edible Arrangements =

American fresh fruit arrangement company

Edible Arrangements, LLC
- Company type: Private Company
- Industry: Food & Beverage Gifting
- Founded: East Haven, Connecticut, USA (1999)
- Founder: Tariq Farid; Kamran Farid
- Headquarters: Atlanta, Georgia USA, United States
- Area served: United States, Canada, Puerto Rico, United Arab Emirates, Saudi Arabia, Qatar, Oman, Kuwait, Hong Kong, Italy, Turkey, Bahrain, India, Jordan and China.
- Products: Bouquets and arrangements of sculpted fresh fruit, chocolate dipped fruit, fresh fruit smoothies, cookies, cupcakes, dessert boards, and flowers
- Revenue: $400+ million (2019)
- Website: ediblearrangements.com

Edible Arrangements, LLC (also simply known as Edible) is an American franchising business that specializes in fresh fruit arrangements, combining the concept of a fruit basket with designs inspired by flower arrangement. The company also sells a variety of specialty fruit gift items, such as gift boxes featuring chocolate dipped fruit and fresh fruit products and other products like fresh fruit cups, fresh fruit smoothies, chocolate dipped fruit cones, flower bouquets, dessert boards, chocolate dipped fruit platters, cookies, and cupcakes.

== History ==
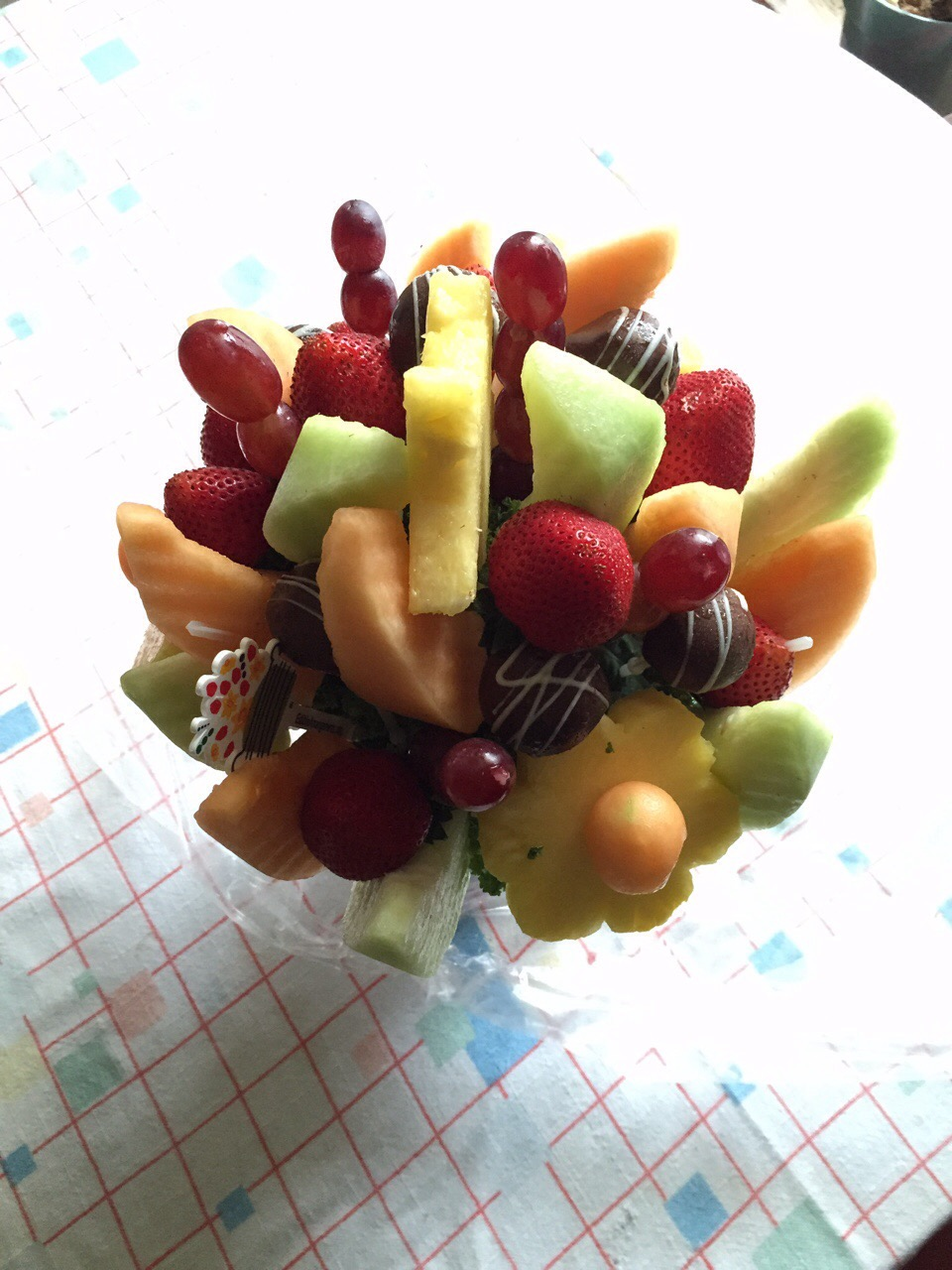
A fruit bouquet made by Edible Arrangements

The company was founded by Tariq Farid and Kamran Farid, and the first Edible Arrangements store opened in East Haven, Connecticut in 1999. After designing the computer systems, training manuals, production and profitability tracking and supply chain management process, they began franchising the concept in 2001. The first official franchise location opened in Waltham, Massachusetts. However, the first store was in Hamden, Connecticut.

In 2009, Edible Arrangements announced the signing of master franchise agreements in Rome and Hong Kong. The Rome master franchise was purchased by VPF International Ltd, and the franchise for Hong Kong was purchased by D.T. Hong Kong Ltd, which is owned by Sanja Dujic. Additionally, in November 2009, an agreement was signed with brothers Kemal and Emre Aydin, who planned to develop 15 locations in Turkey. Edible Arrangements ended 2009 with 74 new stores and franchise agreements for more than 85 locations in the U.S. and internationally, totaling the number of units to 940. The company's U.S. growth in 2009 was concentrated in Texas and the Midwest with stores also opening in other locations including California, Massachusetts, Pennsylvania, and Virginia. A total of 39 U.S. locations closed during the three-year period 2007–2009.

In 2010, the company opened 84 new U.S. stores and 9 international stores; the company also signed commitments for 123 new locations. There are many stores in Connecticut including Glastonbury, Middletown, and Hartford. In January 2011, Edible Arrangements announced its 1,000th franchise agreement.

In 2012, Edible Arrangements purchased a commercial building adjacent to its Wallingford, Connecticut headquarters, adding 23,057 additional square-feet of office space.

As of 2012, the business had grown to more than 1,100 stores serving locations in the United States, Canada, Puerto Rico, the United Arab Emirates, Saudi Arabia, Kuwait, Qatar, Bahrain, Italy, Turkey, Hong Kong, Oman, India and China. In March 2008, Edible Arrangements was reported to have annual revenues of $195 million.

== 2013 - Present ==
Edible Arrangements was ranked number 40 on Entrepreneur magazine's 2013 Entrepreneur Franchise 500 and has appeared on the magazine's list of Top Global Franchises and Fastest-Growing Franchises for five consecutive years. It was also ranked first in category in the Franchise 500 in the years 2007, 2008, 2009, 2010, 2011, 2012, and 2013.

In January 2011, a Forbes magazine article entitled "Top 20 Franchises to Start" ranked Edible Arrangements as number nine. The company also was recently named one of the "Top 100 Internet Retailers" by Internet Retailer magazine.

== Franchisee Lawsuit ==
The issue began in 2010 when Edible Arrangements faced dissatisfaction from some of its franchisees. In January 2010, more than 270 franchisees presented Farid with individual letters expressing opposition to corporate policies and practices that they considered to be harmful to their individual franchised businesses. The franchisees formed the Edible Arrangements Independent Franchisee Association (EAIFA) and hired an attorney to represent them in possible litigation. On September 20, 2010, the group filed a lawsuit in federal court on behalf of 170 franchisees, alleging that several changes the company made in its franchise agreements were unfair or violated contractual obligations to the franchisees. Edible Arrangements International responded to inquiries about the lawsuit by saying that they strongly disagreed with the accusations and would vigorously defend the complaint. The company subsequently initiated a motion in the courts to dismiss the case, but this attempt was denied by a District of Connecticut judge on July 19, 2011, and the franchisees were granted authority to pursue the case on all claims. In 2013, after months of negotiations, Edible Arrangements and EAIFA settled the lawsuit out of court.

== Sponsorship and Awards ==
Edible Arrangements has established a charitable gift giving program with National Breast Cancer Research Foundation in national and local level as a part of Breast Cancer Awareness month each October. Stores located throughout the United States and Canada have established a relationship with the Breast Cancer Society of United States and Canada. In the United States, during the months of September and October 2010, 10% of the purchase price from the Awareness Celebration, Breast Cancer Awareness Bouquet and Heels for Healing Bouquet was donated to the National Breast Cancer Foundation.
