= Old East Haven High School =

- East Haven High School
- U.S. National Register of Historic Places
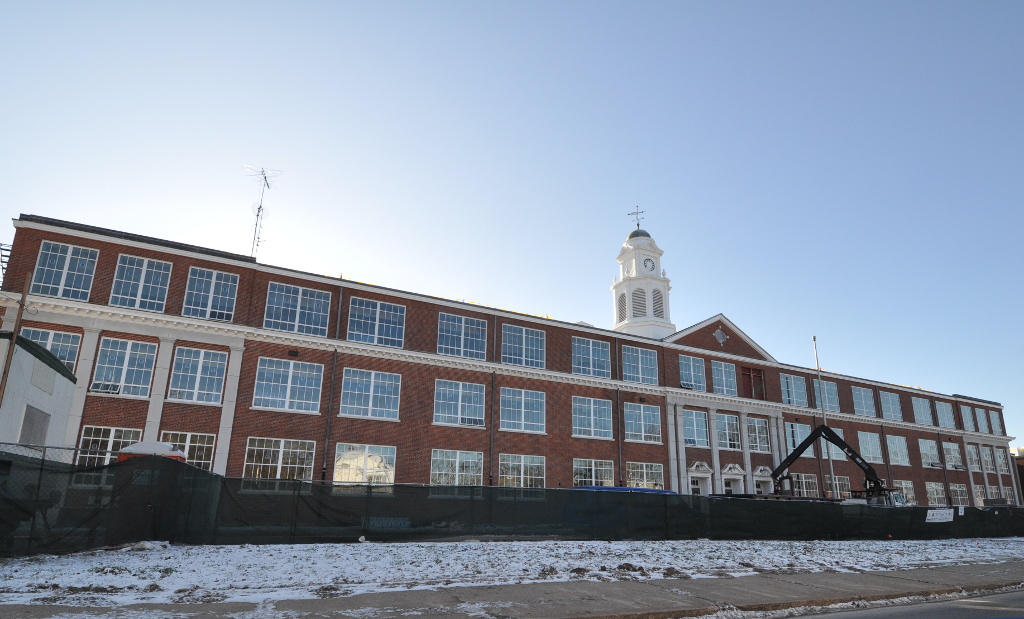
- Location: 200 Tyler Street, East Haven, Connecticut
- Coordinates: 41°16′31″N 72°52′34″W
- Area: 6.5 acres (2.6 ha)
- Built: 1936
- Architect: Roy W. Foote
- Architectural style: Colonial Revival
- NRHP reference No.: 100005190
- Added to NRHP: April 23, 2020

The Old East Haven High School is a historic former school building at 200 Tyler Street in East Haven, Connecticut. Built in 1936, it was the town's first public high school, serving until the present-day East Haven High School opened in 1997. Now converted into housing, the school was listed on the National Register of Historic Places in 2020.

== Description and history ==
East Haven's old high school is located south of downtown East Haven, in a residential area on the south side of Tyler Street between French and Thompson Avenues. It is a three-story masonry structure, built of concrete finished in red brick with concrete and cast stone trim. Its main facade is 21 bays wide, with most bays occupied by large paired sash windows. The outer three bays on each end are articulated by fluted pilasters to the base of the third floor, as are the central three bays. A modillioned cornice separates the second and third floors, and there is a triangular pediment above the center bays on an otherwise flat roof.

The school was built in 1936 to a design by New Haven architect Roy W. Foote. Prior to its construction, the town had sent its high school students to New Haven High School, which was then overcrowded. The school was built with funding support of the federal Public Works Administration, a Depression-era jobs program. It was enlarged with the construction of a new wing in 1964, and a swimming pool was added in 1973 as part of a second wing. The school was closed in 1997, when the current high school opened. It has since been converted to residential use.

== See also ==
- National Register of Historic Places listings in New Haven County, Connecticut
