= Mike Lawlor =

American politician (born 1956)

Michael P. Lawlor

Member of the Connecticut House of Representatives from the 99th district
- In office January 1987 – January 2011
- Succeeded by: James Albis

Personal details
- Born: December 30, 1956 (age 69) New Haven, Connecticut, U.S.
- Party: Democratic
- Website: mikelawlor.net

Michael P. Lawlor (born December 30, 1956) is an American politician, criminal justice professor, and lawyer from Connecticut. A Democrat, he served as a member of the Connecticut House of Representatives from 1987 to 2011, representing the 99th district in East Haven. Lawlor resigned from the legislature on January 4, 2011 to serve in Dan Malloy's administration as undersecretary for criminal justice policy and planning at the Office of Policy and Management.

== Education ==
Lawlor attended public schools in East Haven and graduated from East Haven High School. He was co-captain of the EHHS football team and was Vice-President of the Senior Class.

He graduated as an Honors Scholar in Slavic and Eastern European Studies from the University of Connecticut in 1979. He earned a Master's Degree in Soviet Area Studies from the University of London in 1981 and he graduated from the George Washington University School of Law in 1983. He has also participated in language studies in Russia in 1977 and received a Fulbright-Hays Scholarship to study economic reform in Hungary in 1982.

== Career ==
Following law school, Lawlor was appointed as a prosecutor for the State's Attorney Office in New Haven, where he served until his election to the Connecticut House of Representatives in 1986. In January, 2011 Lawlor resigned from the legislature to join the administration of Governor Dan Malloy to become Undersecretary of Criminal Justice Policy and Planning, where he served until the end of Malloy's second term in January, 2019. In September 2020, Mayor Justin Elicker nominated Lawlor to be a member of the New Haven Board of Police Commissioners. A few months later in January 2021 Governor Ned Lamont nominated Lawlor to be a member of the state's Police Officer Standards and Training Council.

Lawlor has taught at the University of New Haven's Henry C. Lee College of Criminal Justice and Forensic Sciences since 1995 and is currently an Associate Professor of Criminal Justice. He is also a Visiting Lecturer in Law at the Yale Law School.

== Politics ==
=== Judiciary Committee ===
Lawlor was co-chairman of the General Assembly's Judiciary Committee from 1995 to 2011. Prior to that, he was co-chairman of the Labor and Public Employees Committee, where he played a major role in reforming Connecticut's workers' compensation program.

As co-chairman of the Judiciary Committee, Lawlor played a key role in two amendments to the Constitution of Connecticut. The first established rights for victims of crime, the second eliminated the patronage-ridden county sheriff system.

He was one of ten members of the legislature's Select Committee of Inquiry, which considered the possible impeachment of former Governor John G. Rowland. Rowland resigned on June 21, 2004, following the committee's hearings.

He has also been a leader in efforts to enact workable gun control laws, to address racial disparities in the state's criminal justice system, to pass laws ending discrimination on the basis of sexual orientation, to rewrite Connecticut's domestic violence laws, to reform the juvenile justice system, and to address prison overcrowding.

=== Civil union legislation ===
During the 2005 session of the legislature, Lawlor was one of the leaders in enacting Connecticut's civil unions law, which provided full state legal recognition to same sex couples who wish to be treated as married couples under the state's law. Connecticut was the first state to enact a civil union or same sex marriage law without a court order to do so.

In March 2009 Lawlor and Sen. Andrew J. McDonald proposed a new state law proposing to regulate the management of Roman Catholic churches in Connecticut; free speech advocates, church leaders, and members of the Republican House opposition charged the bill violated the separation of church and state clause in the First Amendment. Bill Donahue, President of the Catholic League, an organization which fights anti-Catholic prejudice, called it a "brutal act of revenge by Lawlor and McDonald, two champions of gay marriage... designed to muzzle the voice of the Catholic Church". The Bill, by giving control over matters administrative and fiscal to a board of laity (in which the Bishop and Parish Priest would act only in an advisory capacity) and because it is specific only to the Roman Catholic Church is seen by many as anti-Catholic. The bill was tabled on March 10, 2009.

Lawlor is a chair of the Criminal Justice/Mental Health Consensus Project, an associate with the State Sentencing and Corrections Program at the Vera Institute of Justice in New York City, and a member of the National Resource Committee for the Center for Sex Offender Management within the United States Department of Justice. He is a member of the American Bar Association's Coalition for Justice, a national effort to build trust and confidence in the justice system.

=== Prison overcrowding ===
In the late 1990s, Connecticut addressed its prison overcrowding issues by transferring inmates to prisons in Virginia. Rep. Lawlor strongly opposed this effort. In 2000 he told The Hartford Courant "this policy is more trouble than it's worth," and that he wanted to "bring them back as soon as possible." In 2003 The New York Times reported Lawlor favored replacing the Virginia facilities with "alternative ways of combating overcrowding, like making it harder to put people back in prison for technical violations of their parole, and argued that transfers should be a last resort."

Lawlor has long advocated what was called in 2004 a "controversial bill" which focused on the increased release of prisoners instead of expanding correctional facilities to handle the increased number of offenders entering the system. Thanks to Lawlor's vocal advocacy the bill was co-sponsored by both Republicans and Democrats, passed unanimously in the State Senate, and only 9 out of 151 representatives in the House voted against it. The bill was then signed into law by Governor John G. Rowland. Lawlor's rationale was "The key is to resist doing the simple thing - dumping a bunch of money into a new prison," The response, to expand the number of inmates paroled, became controversial following the July 2007 home invasion murders of the Petit family in Cheshire, Connecticut by two paroled convicts. On August 26, 2007 he defended the state's policy on paroles in a Hartford Courant article "Some people say let's put them all in jail. OK, fine, but that means dramatically increasing taxes or shutting down a bunch of colleges." Due to the public outcry since the Petit murders, Lawlor agreed to hold hearings on Connecticut's parole system and called on state officials to investigate sites to build new prisons. "We are expected to receive information about the costs of these models and possible sites for new prison facilities," he said. State officials and national criminal justice experts testified at the September 11 hearing, with Chief State's Attorney Kevin Kane labeling the existing data system for criminal justice "nonexistent." Lawlor criticized the agencies for not having a system of communications among each other. A hearing open to the public was held on November 27, 2007.

Governor M. Jodi Rell announced on September 21, 2007 that there would be a moratorium on further parole of violent offenders. This occurred after a parolee with two prior kidnapping convictions carjacked a vehicle in Hartford and was later shot in a confrontation with New York City police. Lawlor supported her decision for a moratorium on parole and acknowledged this would require prompt efforts to expand prison space. He urged Governor Rell to explore the state's options for either expanding existing prisons, building new prisons, or sending prisoners out of state. The governor in response refused to do so, saying that new additional prison space is not necessary and reiterated her opposition to sending prisoners out of state. Ironically, this placed Rell in the same position Lawlor had long held, as he had opposed sending Connecticut prisoners to Virginia prisons to ease overcrowding.

In testimony before the Judiciary Committee at an emergency meeting convened by Lawlor in October, Department of Corrections Commissioner Teresa Lantz concurred with Governor Rell, testifying that her department does not need nor is requesting additional staff or new prisons Lawlor announced that he disagrees with Rell and Lantz, saying that the state should look into building a new prison, adding beds to existing facilities, or hiring more staff. Nonetheless, on December 12, 2007 he was quoted by the Associated Press as stating "Connecticut has a criminal justice system that already works pretty well."

=== Three strikes law ===
A special session to enact tougher laws against home invasion and tighten the parole process was held January 22, 2008. A new law making home invasion a class A felony was passed, as well as reforming the parole board. Lawlor opposed efforts to pass a Three Strikes law in Connecticut, which was not passed.

Governor Rell reiterated her call for a Three Strikes bill on March 31, 2008, following the kidnapping murder of an elderly New Britain woman committed by a career criminal recently released from Connecticut prison.

He has served on the national drafting team for the Interstate Compact for Adult Offender Supervision and the Interstate Compact for Juvenile Probation and Parole. Recently, he served as a consultant for the United States Department of Justice assisting in the establishment of an adult probation system in Bulgaria.

== Personal ==
Lawlor is openly gay. In June, 2013 Lawlor Married his husband David Zakur at the Governor's Residence. Connecticut Supreme Court Justice Andrew McDonald performed the ceremony, which was attended by then-Governor Dannel P. Malloy, Lieutenant Governor Nancy Wyman and Attorney General George Jepsen. This was the first ever same-sex marriage performed at a state governor's residence.

== See also ==
- Connecticut House of Representatives
- Connecticut General Assembly
