= April Capone Almon =

American politician

April Capone

Mayor of East Haven
- In office 2007–2011
- Preceded by: Joseph A. Maturo Jr.
- Succeeded by: Joseph A. Maturo Jr.

Personal details
- Party: Democratic
- Education: Southern Connecticut State University

April Capone (born c. 1975) is an American businesswoman and politician, the former mayor of East Haven, Connecticut, serving two terms from 2007 to 2011. A member of the Democratic Party, she was the first woman elected as mayor and the youngest, winning after three recounts by the narrowest margin recorded. With private sector experience, she had been elected previously to the town council.

== Early life ==
Capone was born, raised and educated in East Haven, Connecticut. She attended local schools and received her MBA from Southern Connecticut State University. She married in 1999 to Regan Almon and divorced in 2011.

== Career ==
She entered local politics and was elected to the 15-member Town Council of East Haven as its only Democrat. In 2010 Democratic registered voters outnumbered registered Republicans, but another major portion of the electorate is independent.

In 2007, Capone challenged the 10-year Republican incumbent mayor, Joseph A. Maturo, Jr., and ran a campaign based on change. She claimed her private sector experience in budget and fiscal management could help her improve city government. She promoted upgrading the city's use of technology, and developing Candlestick Park for the city.

After three recounts, Capone won by 25 votes, the closest election in the town's history. She was the first woman elected mayor of East Haven, and the youngest at age 32.

In September 2009, Capone and her assistant Erica Berg turned themselves in to police; they were arrested on charges of interfering with police towing cars at Cosey Beach on July 19. The state did not prosecute this case. On September 28, 2009, former Police Commissioner William J. Illingworth filed an ethics complaint against Almon for her having substantially raised the salary of her assistant Berg in 2008, suggesting they may have an improper personal relationship. Supporters of Capone Almon suggested his action was to try to discredit the mayor prior to the election, scheduled for early November, and questioned why Illingworth had not challenged the raise when it took place in 2008.

"Capone confirmed that Berg got a $9,960 raise, effective July 1, 2008, increasing her salary from just over $40,000 to $50,000. But she said Berg's job was reclassified at the same time, with the added duties of writing grants and scheduling special events -- and since then, Berg's efforts have brought in $742,156 in grant revenue." In 2008, twenty other positions had received raises, which were also criticized in 2009 by Capone Almon's Republican challenger in the November election. Capone Almon was re-elected. Under her administration, the city has increased the amount of money it has gained in grants for improvements.

In 2009, the United States Department of Justice began an investigation into actions by the police department, about which many complaints of harassment of Latinos had been received. It issued a preliminary report on the conduct of the East Haven police department under Police Chief Leonard Gallo, who had served since his 1998 appointment by former mayor Joseph Maturo, Jr. DOJ was conducting both a civil and criminal investigation into the conduct of the department following a 2009 "unwarranted arrest of a Catholic priest who was looking into charges that his Latino parishioners were victims of police discrimination." Capone Almon put Gallo on administrative leave after receiving the report, pending final actions.

== 2011 General Election ==
In the November 2011 General Election, Capone, the incumbent, was challenged by Republican Joseph Maturo, Jr., the former mayor. He narrowly defeated her by 31 votes. This slim margin forced an automatic recount, as had occurred in the 2007 election, but he maintained his victory. He immediately reinstated Gallo, who barred police commission members from police headquarters and the parking lot. They soon passed a policy that required him to allow them access.

In December 2011, the Justice Department delivered its final report of the civil investigation into the police department, concluding that it had a pattern of "systematically discriminating against Latinos." It also found that the department had repeatedly changed reports of the arrests of Almon and Father Paul Manship, trying to cover up evidence in these cases. As of January 2012, the Justice Department criminal investigation resulted in the arrests of four officers for harassing Latinos, and authorities said that Gallo had interfered with the investigation, as if he "didn't understand civilian control of the police department." After the arrests, Gallo resigned as police chief in late January 2012. In 2012 two officers pleaded guilty; the other two were convicted at trial in 2013. In 2014 all received sentences, with sentences ranging up to 5 years in federal prison.

== Private life ==
On April 8, 2010, Capone donated a kidney to resident Carlos Sanchez, whose kidneys were failing due to diabetes. She had seen his request on Facebook and privately pursued the issue, finding she was a match. They spent about a week in the hospital after surgery before each returned to work.

Political offices
Preceded by Joseph A. Maturo Jr.	Mayor of East Haven, CT; 2007–2011	Succeeded by Joseph A. Maturo Jr.
