= East Haven Academy =

Coordinates: 41.28623°N 72.86620°W

- 67 Hudson Street; East Haven, CT 06512; United States

Information
- Type: Public magnet
- Motto: Give your best effort in all that you do and have a great learning day.
- Opened: 1997
- School district: East Haven School District
- Principal: Kristina Torre
- Faculty: 21
- Grades: 1-8
- Enrollment: 286
- Newspaper: EHA News
- Information: (203) 468-3219
- Website: https://eha.easthavenschools.org/

East Haven Academy is a public Magnet school in East Haven, Connecticut that enrolls children in grades 1-8. It opened on September 3, 1997. In 2005 " EHA" was recognized as a Blue Ribbon School by the U.S. Department of Education. In September 2007 a team of four 8th grade students from EHA won Gold Medals in the Science Olympics held at Academy of Our Lady of Mercy, Lauralton Hall which tested teams of students in the subject areas of Physics, Chemistry, Geology, and Biology. The school maintains an active chapter of the National Junior Honor Society.
