= First Congregational Church of East Haven =

Historic church in Connecticut, United States

- U.S. National Register of Historic Places
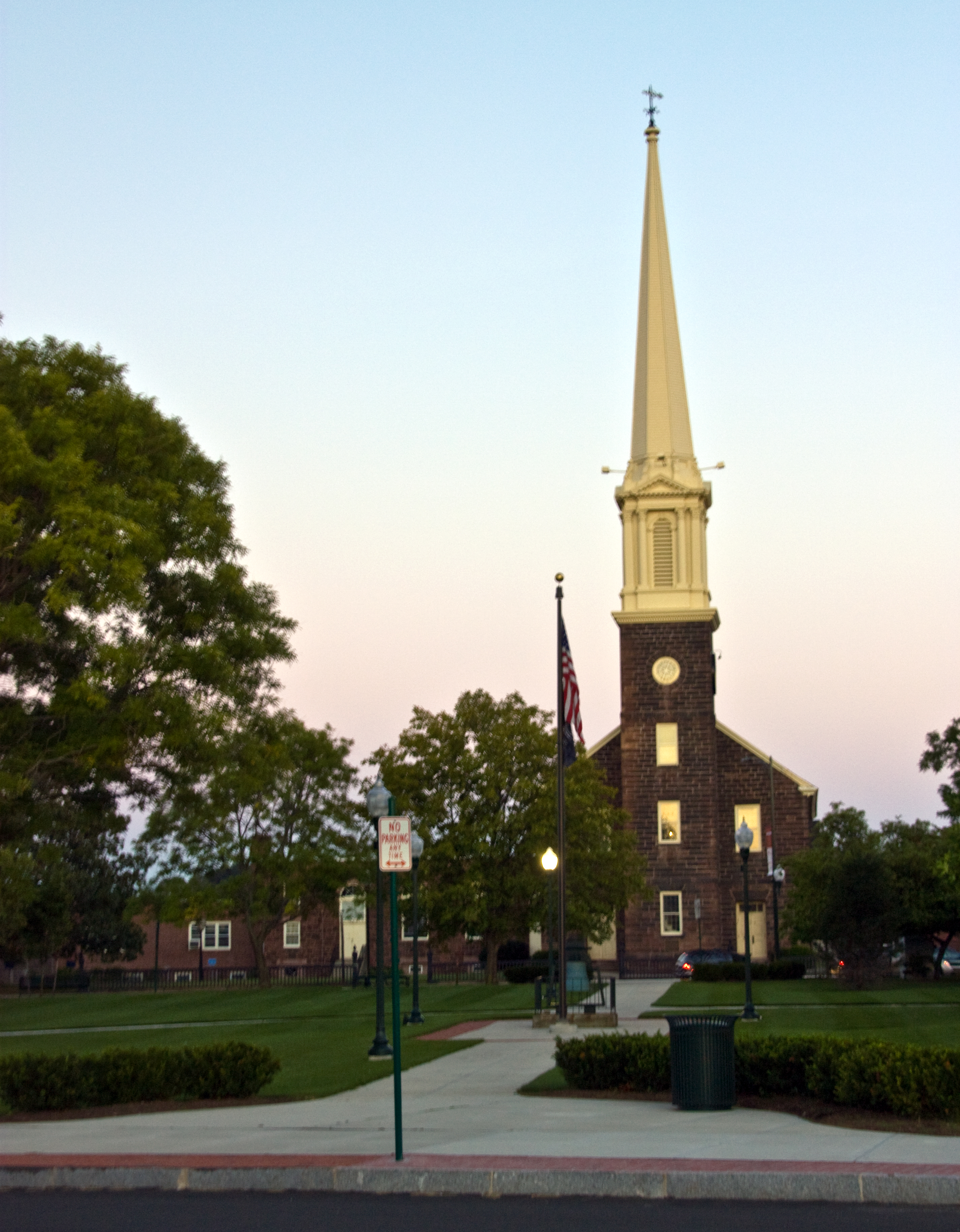

- Location within Connecticut Location within the United States
- Location: 251 Main Street, East Haven, Connecticut
- Coordinates: 41°16′41″N 72°52′19″W
- Area: 2.5 acres (1.0 ha)
- Built: 1774
- Built by: Lancraft, George
- NRHP reference No.: 82004349
- Added to NRHP: March 25, 1982

The First Congregational Church of East Haven (also known as Old Stone Church) is a historic church at 251 Main Street in East Haven, Connecticut. It was built in 1772-74 by George Lancraft, a local builder, and is one of Connecticut's few surviving pre-Revolutionary churches. It is also one of New England's oldest stone churches, preceded principally by King's Chapel in Boston, Massachusetts. The church was listed on the National Register of Historic Places in 1982. The congregation is affiliated with the United Church of Christ.

== Description and history ==
The First Congregational Church of East Haven occupies a prominent position at the eastern end of the town green in the center of East Haven. It is a 2-1/2 story structure, built out of red sandstone quarried in nearby Fair Haven, and mortared with a combination of historic lime mortar and more recent cement mortar. A square tower rises from the west-facing main facade, with three levels of base surmounted by a clock stage, a wooden belfry with late Georgian features, and an octagonal steeple. Entrances are set in the bays flanking the tower. Windows are set in rectangular openings with stone sills and flared lintels, and there is a slightly projecting stringcourse between the floors. The interior is reflective of an 1850 renovation, in which the pulpit was moved from the long north wall to the east end. At that time, the main entrance was also relocated; it had originally been placed at the center of the long south wall, a traditional placement for colonial meeting houses.

The church was built in 1772-74 by George Lancraft, a stonemason from Fair Haven. It was designed in part by Lancraft and by the congregation's building committee, which made alterations (including lengthening the building and adding the tower) while it was under construction. The church was looted of its silver during a British raid in the American Revolutionary War.

== See also ==
- National Register of Historic Places listings in New Haven County, Connecticut
