= East Haven Green Historic District =

Historic district in Connecticut, United States

- U.S. National Register of Historic Places
- U.S. Historic district
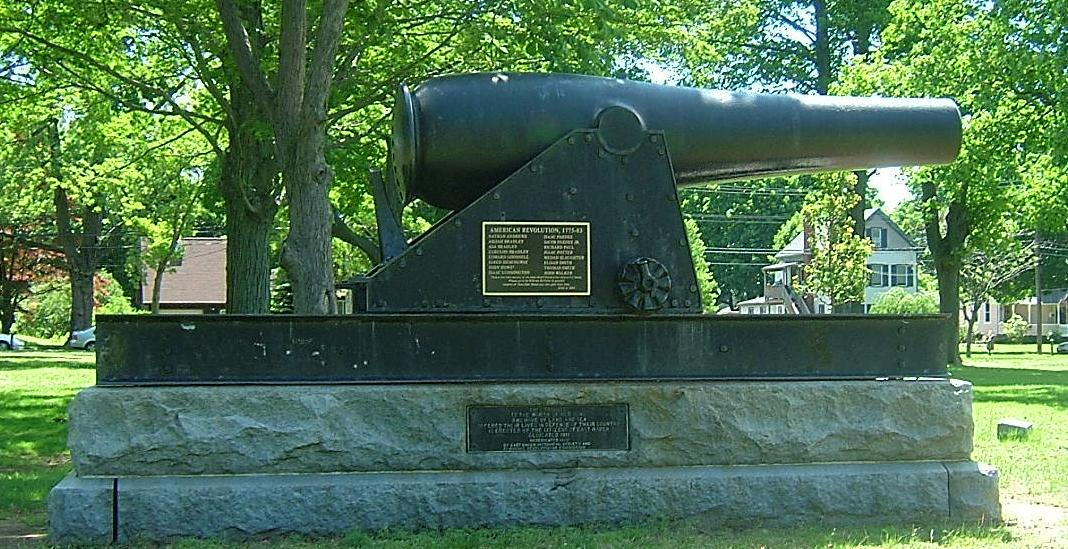
- Location: 263,270,274 Hemingway Avenue, 125,129,133,139,143,150 Main Street, 3,7,11,15,23,27,39,47 Park Place & 58,100 River Street, East Haven, Connecticut
- Coordinates: 41°16′28″N 72°52′3″W
- Architectural style: Colonial, Queen Anne, Italianate
- NRHP reference No.: 02000336
- Added to NRHP: April 11, 2002

The East Haven Green is the town green of the New England town of East Haven, Connecticut. It is bounded by River Street, Hemingway Avenue, Main Street, and Park Place and is the focal point of the East Haven Green Historic District, listed on the National Register of Historic Places. This area is also part of the commercial business district of the town and contains many two- and three-story brick office buildings that have been constructed within the last ten or fifteen years. Farther to the northwest are a shopping center and high-rise apartment buildings.

On the other corner of Hemingway Avenue are two older, wood-frame houses. One is a late 17th-century two-story house that has been converted to offices. Other wood-frame houses can also be found along the Main Street and Park Place sides of the green, most of them dating to the late 19th or early 20th centuries. Along Park Place are two houses built in the 18th century with a more modern Episcopal church (Christ and The Epiphany Church, built in 1964) located between the two. The other houses on the block were built around the turn of the century. To the south of the green is River Street, a two-lane street, and the Eastlawn Cemetery and The Old Cemetery. Part of The Old Cemetery is enclosed by an iron fence with a large stone gateway.

On the green itself, there are two concrete paths lined with lamp posts that cross diagonally. In the center of the green is a hexagonal bandstand and a Revolutionary War cannon. It and other monuments honor war veterans including World War I, World War II, Korean and Vietnam. Another monument at the northeast corner of the green honors General Lafayette also known as Gilbert du Motier, marquis de Lafayette, and his troops that camped on the Green when they were in East Haven during the Revolutionary War. It is said that the General visited the 18th century colonial house on Main Street during his stay on the Green.

At the northwest corner of the green, facing the commercial section, are three stone memorials. One is a monument erected by the American Legion dedicated to war veterans. This monument and the two flagpoles flanking it are spotlighted. Behind and to each side of the American Legion monument are monuments dedicated to soldiers who fought in World War I, and to East Haven men who died in World War II.

The town cemetery located south of the Green is also included in the East Haven Green Historic District.

== See also ==
- National Register of Historic Places listings in New Haven County, Connecticut
