= James Albis =

Member of the Connecticut House of Representatives from the 99th district
- In office February 2011 – January 8, 2019
- Preceded by: Mike Lawlor
- Succeeded by: Joseph Zullo

Personal details
- Born: 1983 or 1984 (age 41–42)
- Party: Democratic

James M. Albis (born 1983 or 1984) is an American politician who served as a member of the Connecticut House of Representatives from the 99th district. A Democrat, he was first elected in a 2011 special election, serving until he resigned in 2019 after being appointed to the Department of Energy and Environmental Protection by governor Ned Lamont.

== Early life and education ==
Albis is the son of Michael and Jackie Albis. Michael Albis served as a Judge of Probate in East Haven. His grandfather, Francis Albis, was a doctor in the area.

Albis was born and raised in East Haven. Albis graduated from East Haven High School in 2002 and received a bachelor's degree in economics from New York University in 2006. He has a master's degree in environmental management from Yale University.

== Political career ==
In January 2011, long-time Democratic representative Mike Lawlor resigned from representing the 99th district in Connecticut House of Representatives after governor Dannel Malloy appointed him to serve as the state's undersecretary for criminal justice policy and planning. Malloy scheduled the special election for the district, based in West Haven, for February 22. On January 11, West Haven's Democratic committee chose James Albis as the party's nominee, while the Republican committee chose Linda Monaco, a lawyer who had run for the seat in 2010.

This special election was held alongside eight others in the state, all caused by Democratic resignations. The state Republican Party attempted to make the elections a referendum on governor Malloy's proposal to raise taxes. However, they had limited success: only two of the legislative seats flipped. Albis narrowly defeated his Republican opponent, receiving about 51.7% of the vote.

Albis won reelection easily in 2012, defeating Republican Craig Cubellotti with about 68.5% of the vote.

Albis was challenged by Republican Stacy Gravino, the East Haven town clerk, in 2014. He won reelection with around 67.4% of the vote.

In 2016, Albis was challenged by Republican Steve Tracey, a bail bondsman and former professional wrestler who competed in the World Wrestling Federation under the name "Dave Paradise". On election night, Albis led Tracey by 14 votes, a margin that dropped to 11 following a recount. (Note: News coverage reported that Albis received 5,004 votes, winning by 9 votes, but Albis received 5,006 votes in the certified results published by the secretary of state.) Albis attributed the narrowed margin to the appeal of Donald Trump in the concurrent presidential election, as Trump won the town of East Haven with around 54% of the vote.

Albis was challenged by Republican Robert Parente, a member of the East Haven town council, in 2018. He defeated Parente with about 58.2% of the vote.

During Albis's time in the legislature, he was a co-chairman of the Environment Committee. On January 8, 2019, Albis resigned from the legislature to serve as an advisor to the commissioner of energy and environmental protection in incoming governor Ned Lamont's administration. Republican Joe Zullo defeated Democrat Josh Balter in the special election to succeed Albis, the first time a Republican had won the 99th district since 1985.

Albis joined Graff Public Solutions, a lobbying firm, in November 2024.

== Personal life ==
As of 2024, Albis lives in Middletown, Connecticut with his wife and son.

== Electoral history ==
2011 Connecticut's 99th House of Representatives district special election
Party	Candidate	Votes	%
Democratic	James M. Albis	1,195	43.39
Working Families	James M. Albis	228	8.28
Total	James M. Albis	1,423	51.67
Republican	Linda Monaco	1,331	48.33
Total votes		2,754	100.0
Democratic hold			

2012 Connecticut's 99th House of Representatives district election
Party	Candidate	Votes	%
Democratic	James M. Albis	5,386	62.46
Working Families	James M. Albis	518	6.01
Total	James M. Albis	5,904	68.47
Republican	Craig Cubellotti	2,528	29.32
Independent Party	Craig Cubellotti	191	2.22
Total	Craig Cubellotti	2,719	31.53
Total votes		8,623	100.0
Democratic hold			

2014 Connecticut's 99th House of Representatives district election
Party	Candidate	Votes	%
Democratic	James M. Albis	3,876	59.21
Working Families	James M. Albis	343	5.24
Independent Party	James M. Albis	190	2.90
Total	James M. Albis	4,409	67.35
Republican	Stacy Gravino	2,137	32.65
Total votes		6,546	100.0
Democratic hold			

2016 Connecticut's 99th House of Representatives district election
Party	Candidate	Votes	%
Democratic	James M. Albis	4,565	45.65
Working Families	James M. Albis	441	4.41
Total	James M. Albis	5,006	50.05
Republican	"Big" Steve Tracey	4,653	46.53
Independent Party	"Big" Steve Tracey	342	3.42
Total	"Big" Steve Tracey	4,995	49.95
Total votes		10,001	100.0
Democratic hold			

2018 Connecticut's 99th House of Representatives district election
Party	Candidate	Votes	%
Democratic	James M. Albis	4,502	53.60
Working Families	James M. Albis	384	4.57
Total	James M. Albis	4,886	58.17
Republican	Robert M. Parente	3,407	40.56
Independent Party	Robert M. Parente	107	1.27
Total	Robert M. Parente	3,514	41.83
Total votes		8,400	100.0
Democratic hold			
