= Tariq Farid =

Pakistani-American entrepreneur

Tariq Farid is a Pakistani-American entrepreneur who is the Founder of Edible Arrangements International Inc.

In 2009 he was recognized as Entrepreneur of the Year by the International Franchise Association.

In 2017, Tariq Farid was inducted into the prestigious list of Hall of Fame by International Franchise Association.

== Biography ==
Tariq Farid was born in Sahiwal, Pakistan, in 1969, the oldest of six children of Ghulam and Salma Farid. Tariq is great grandson of Maher Khar Din (Lumber -dar) and grandson of Maher Amir u Din (Lumber-dar) of Chak no. 86/6-r Sahiwal. His father son of Maher Amir u Din emigrated to the United States in the 1970s, working in Connecticut as a machinist. Tariq Farid arrived in the United States with the rest of the family in 1981, when he was 11 years old. As a teenager, Tariq mowed lawns and worked in a Burger King restaurant. In 1986, when he was 17, the family bought and began operating a flower shop in East Haven, Connecticut. While working in the family business, which expanded to additional locations, Tariq developed a computerized point of sale system for floral shops, and struck out on his own in 1991 in a business selling computer systems to flower retailers.

== Business ventures ==
By 1993, the computer enterprise grew into the computer software distributor Netsolace.

In 1999, he and his brothers partnered to open the first Edible Arrangements store in Hamden, Connecticut. The business specializes in fresh fruit arrangements, melding the concept of fruit baskets with design inspired by the floral business. After designing the computer systems, training manuals, production and profitability tracking and supply chain management process, they began franchising the concept in 2001. Farid often highlights Edible Arrangement franchisees on his blog, TariqFarid.com.

As Founder, Farid has grown the company to more than 1,200 stores serving locations in the United States, Canada, Puerto Rico, the United Arab Emirates, China, Saudi Arabia, Kuwait, Qatar, Bahrain, Italy, Hong Kong, India, and Jordan.

In 2006, Farid also launched the franchise concept Frutation by Edible Arrangements out of his desire to provide consumers an "on-the-go" option; now called "Edible® Treats". In March 2008 the company was reported to have revenues of $195 million. By 2014, the company's 15th anniversary year, Edible Arrangements had 1,200 locations and annual sales of approximately $500 million.

In 2010, Edible Arrangements faced dissatisfaction from some of its franchisees. In January 2010, more than 270 franchisees presented Farid with individual letters expressing opposition to corporate policies and practices that they considered to be harmful to their individual franchised businesses. The franchisees formed an association known as "EA Independent Franchisees Association, LLC", or "EAIFA" and hired an attorney to represent them in possible litigation. On September 20, 2010 the group filed a lawsuit in federal court on behalf of 170 franchisees, alleging that several changes the company made in its franchise agreements were unfair or violated contractual obligations to the franchisees. Edible Arrangements International, responded to inquiries about the lawsuit by saying that they strongly disagreed with the accusations and would vigorously defend the complaint. The company subsequently initiated a motion in the courts to dismiss the case, but this attempt was denied by a District of Connecticut judge on July 19, 2011 and the franchisees were granted authority to pursue the case on all claims. The lawsuit was amicably settled in 2013.

== Awards and recognitions ==
In 2009 Tariq was recognized as Entrepreneur of the Year by the International Franchise Association.

In 2009 Tariq was named the Ernst & Young Entrepreneur of the Year. He spoke at the 3rd Leadership Summit held by the council for the advancement of Muslim Professionals and at the Small Business Summit held by The New York Times.

He is one of the top 5 wealthiest Pakistani Americans.
