= East Haven High School =

Public school in Connecticut, United States

Location
- 35 Wheelbarrow Lane; East Haven, Connecticut 06513; United States; 41°19′44″N 72°49′56″W

Information
- Type: Public
- Motto: "Exploring, Empowering, Achieving"
- Established: 1936 (90 years ago)
- CEEB code: 070175
- Principal: Vincent DeNuzzo
- Grades: 9-12
- Enrollment: 879 (2024-2025)
- Colors: Blue and gold
- Athletics conference: Southern Connecticut Conference
- Mascot: Yellow Jacket
- Accreditation: New England Association of Schools and Colleges
- Newspaper: The Comet
- Yearbook: The Pioneer
- Website: ehhs.easthavenschools.org
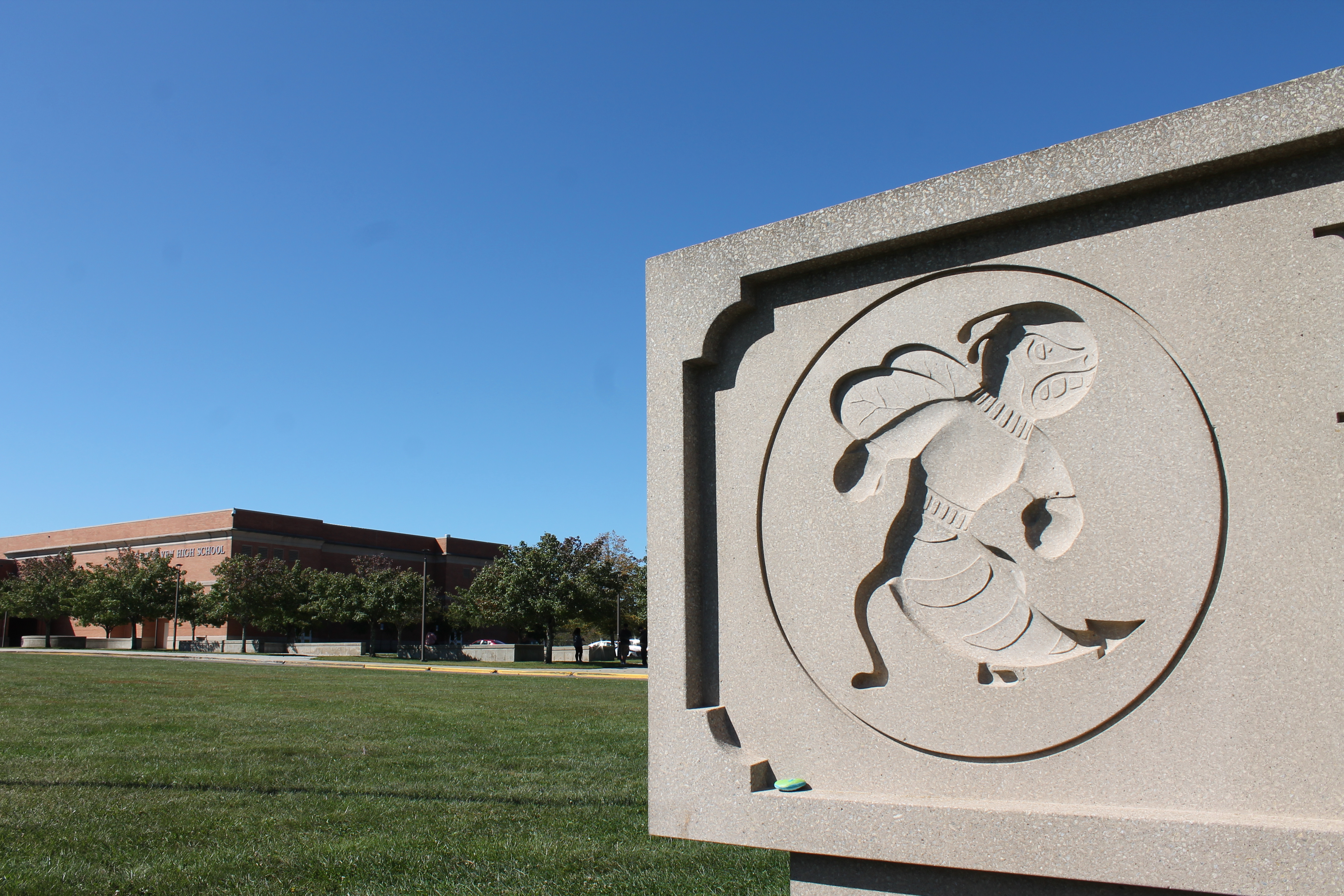
- East Haven High School sign and exterior

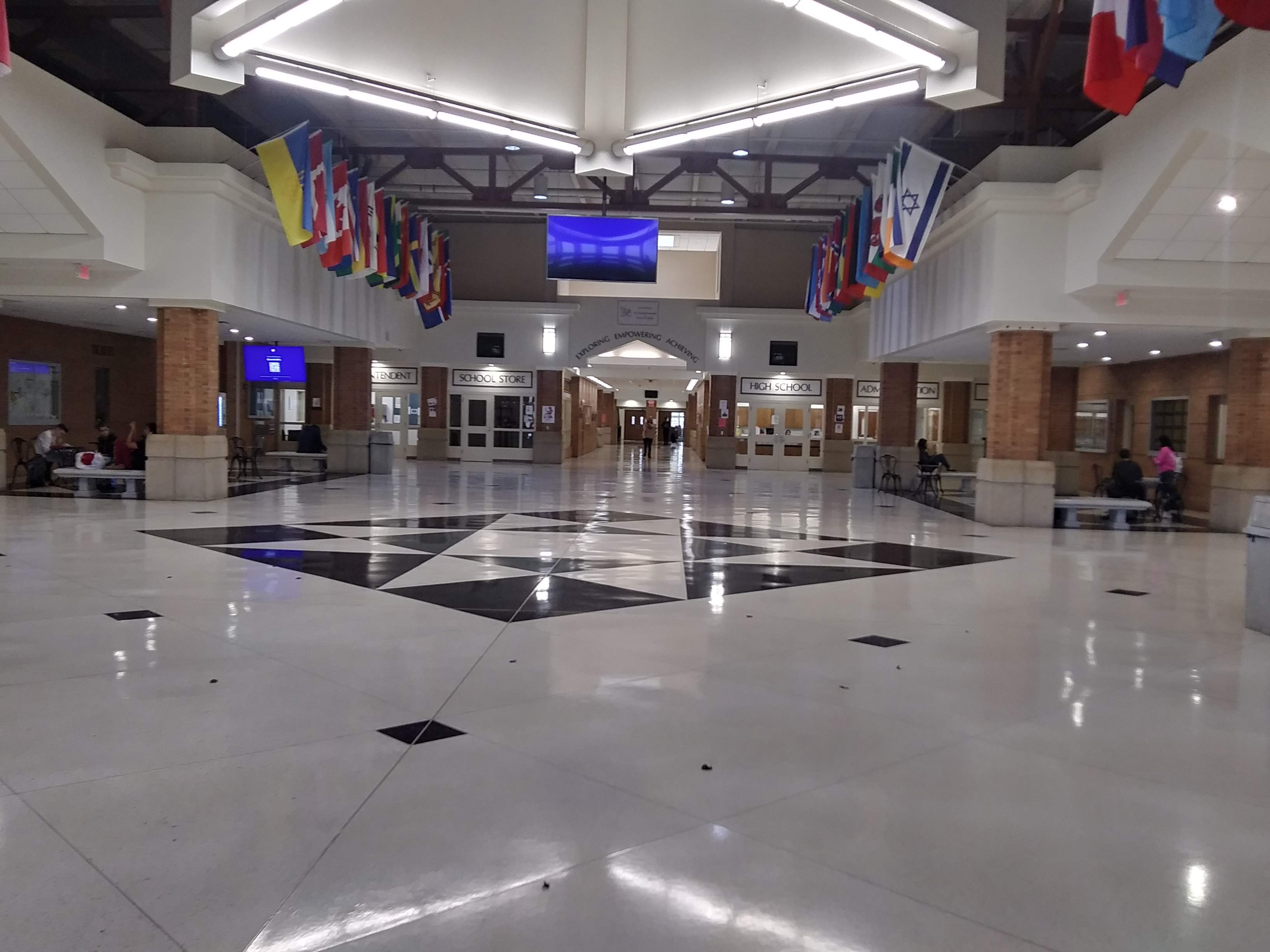
- East Haven High School interior

East Haven High School is a co-educational public school located in East Haven, Connecticut. It serves grades nine through twelve and its school colors are blue and gold, with the mascot being the yellow jacket. The school is a member of the Southern Connecticut Conference (SCC) for athletics.

== Location ==
The school is located at 35 Wheelbarrow Lane in East Haven, Connecticut. The current building opened in September 1997. The original high school building, located at 200 Tyler Street, was converted into apartments for adults 55 and over in 2020.

== Accreditation ==
East Haven High School is accredited by the New England Association of Schools and Colleges (NEASC).

== Academics ==
The school's curriculum includes a diverse range of courses, including English language arts, mathematics, social studies, science, world language, fine arts, music, physical education/health, and career/technical education. The school also partners with the University of Connecticut and Gateway Community College to offer dual enrollment courses for college credit.

== Athletics ==
East Haven High School provides a wide range of athletic opportunities for its students through its women's and men's sports programs. These programs span across three levels of competition—freshman, junior varsity, and varsity—and are available during the fall, winter, and spring seasons.

Fall sports include soccer, cheerleading, swimming, football, volleyball, and cross country. Winter sports include basketball, hockey, indoor track, wrestling, and pom poms. Spring sports include baseball, softball, outdoor track, tennis, and golf.

CIAC State Championship Wins
Sport	Class	Year(s)
Baseball	M	1958
Baseball	L	1987
Basketball (boys)	M	1954, 1955, 1957, 1960, 1963
Basketball (boys)	L	1980
Basketball (girls)	M	2018
Ice Hockey (boys)	II	1998, 2025
Softball	L	2015
Softball	LL	1984
Volleyball (girls)	L	2004

== Extracurricular activities ==
The East Haven co-op marching band includes students from East Haven High School and neighboring North Branford High School. This group earned national recognition by winning the Class 2A title in the 2019 USBands competition and the Class 1A title in 2022.

== Notable alumni ==
- Mike Lawlor (class of 1974), state representative
- Ed Rapuano (class of 1975), Major League Baseball (MLB) umpire
- Matt DelGuidice (class of 1986), former National Hockey League (NHL) goalie
- James Albis (class of 2002), state representative
