= East Haven, Connecticut =

- Town
- Town of East Haven
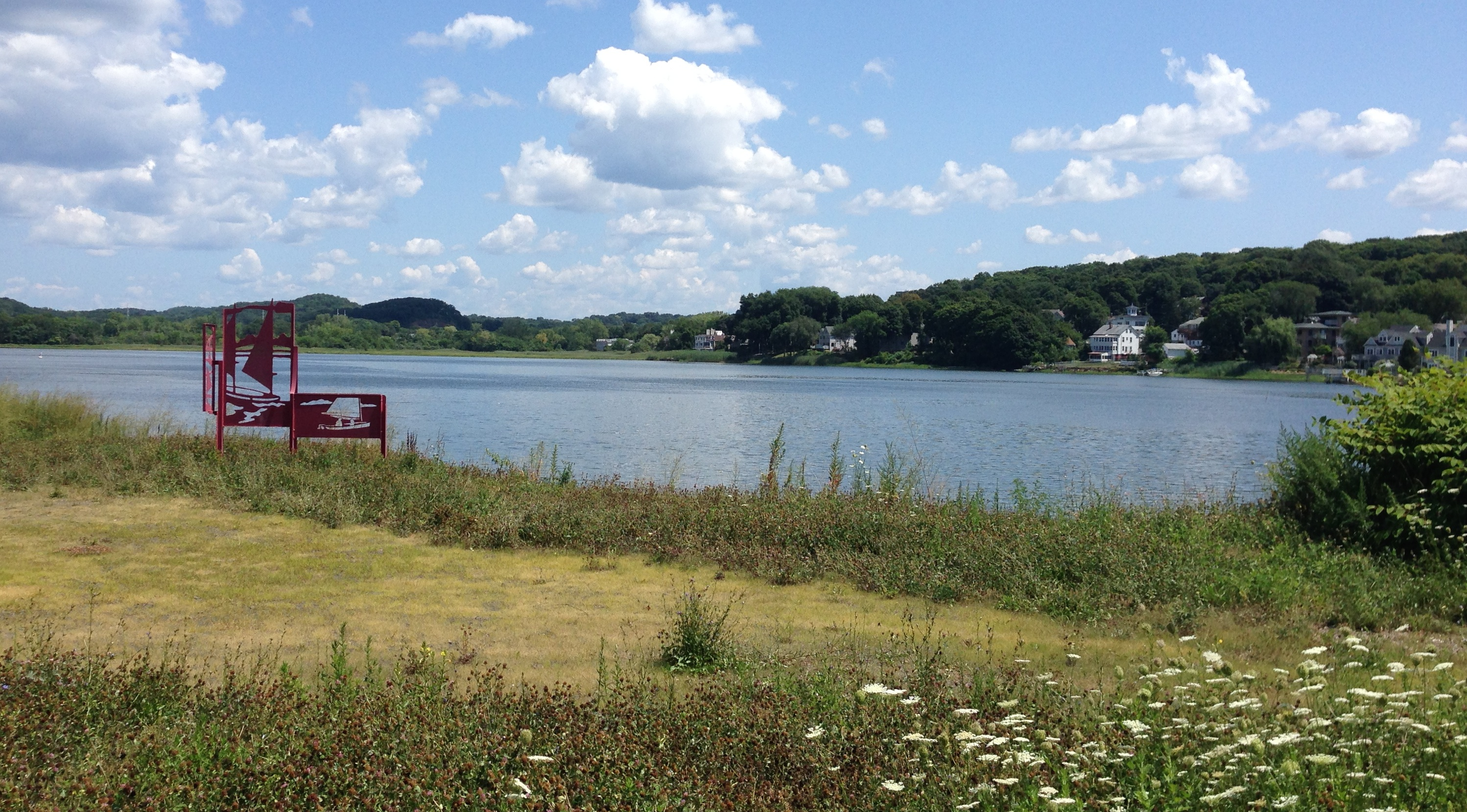
- View of East Haven across the Quinnipiac River

- Seal
- Interactive map of East Haven, Connecticut
- Coordinates: 41°17′44″N 72°51′45″W
- Country: United States
- U.S. state: Connecticut
- County: New Haven
- Region: South Central CT
- Incorporated: 1785

Government
  - Type: Mayor-council
  - Mayor: Joseph Carfora

Area
  - Total: 13.4 sq mi (34.8 km^{2})
  - Land: 12.3 sq mi (31.8 km^{2})
  - Water: 1.2 sq mi (3.0 km^{2})
- Elevation: 30 ft (9 m)

Population (2020)
  - Total: 27,923
  - Density: 2,270/sq mi (878/km^{2})
- Time zone: UTC−5 (Eastern)
  - Summer (DST): UTC−4 (Eastern)
- ZIP code: 06473, 06512, 06513
- Area codes: 203/475
- FIPS code: 09-22910
- GNIS feature ID: 0213425
- Website: www.easthaven-ct.gov

East Haven is a town in New Haven County, Connecticut, United States. As of the 2020 census, the town population was 27,923. The town is located 3 miles (5 km) east of New Haven, and is part of the South Central Connecticut Planning Region. East Haven is 35 miles (56 km) from Hartford, 82 miles (132 km) from New York City, 99 miles (159 km) from Providence, Rhode Island, and 140 miles (230 km) from Boston.

== History ==
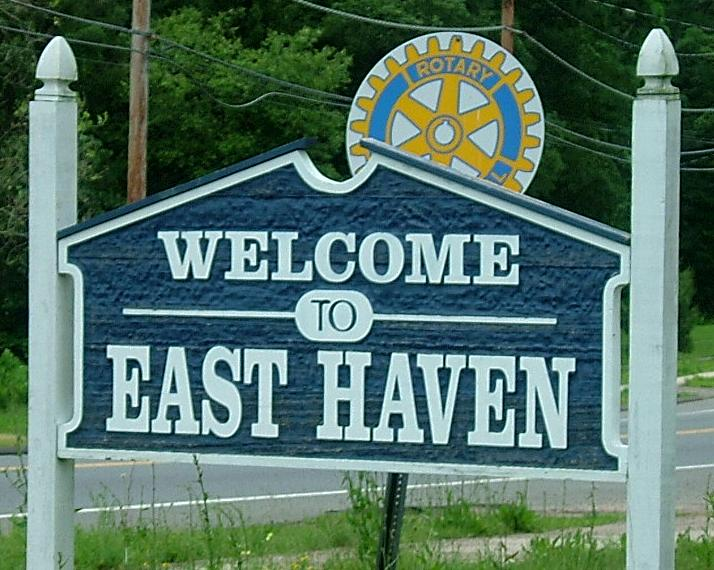
Welcome to East Haven

The Connecticut Colony granted the town petition for Township in May 1707 and colonists changed the name from Iron Works Village to East Haven. Some outstanding land issues with New Haven and a minor feud with Governor Gurdon Saltonstall resulted in the rescinding of the township status; the area was made a parish of New Haven.

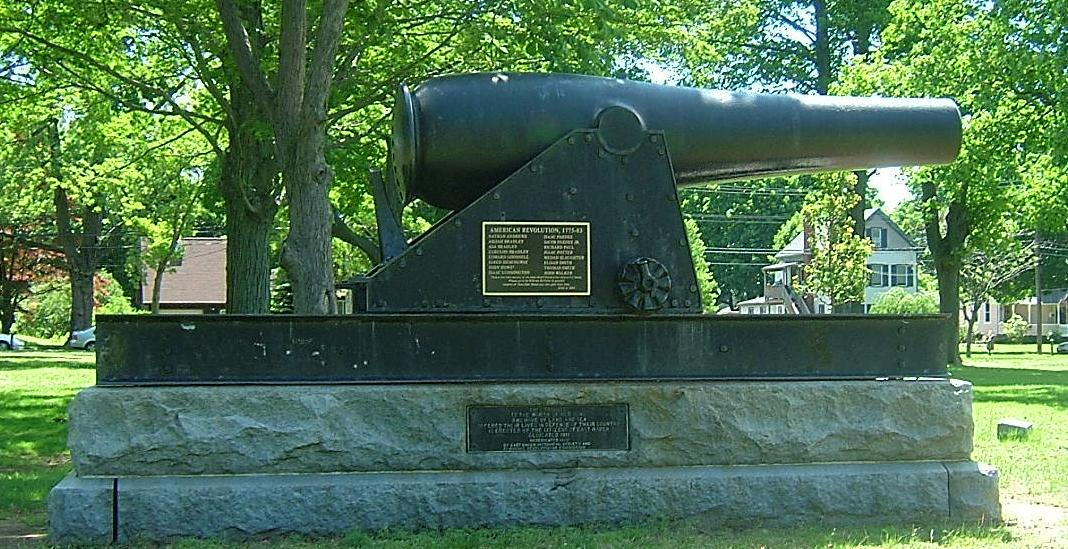
Civil War cannon from Fort Nathan Hale, installed on the East Haven Green

Once home to a large Italian population, New Haven and neighboring towns such as East Haven have been destinations for a new wave of immigrants since the late 20th century, the majority of whom in East Haven are Latinos from Ecuador. In the 2010 census, Hispanics and Latinos made up more than 10% of the town's population.

On August 9, 2013, a Rockwell International Turbo Commander 690B crashed on approach, hitting two houses in an East Haven residential neighborhood near the airport. The impact and the resulting fires destroyed both houses. The private plane had taken off from Teterboro Airport in New Jersey. The incident resulted in four deaths: the pilot of the plane; his passenger, the pilot's 17-year-old son; and two children in one of the houses. They were girls of 13 years and one year of age.

== Geography and climate ==
According to the United States Census Bureau, the town has a total area of 13.4 sq mi (34.8 km^{2})， of which 12.3 sq mi (31.8 km^{2}) is land and 1.19 sq mi (3.08 km^{2}) (8.57%) is water. East Haven also contains Stony Island, approximately 660 yards (600 m) from East Haven Town Beach in Long Island Sound.

The shape of East Haven on a map is taller than it is wide. It is bordered on the south by Long Island Sound, on the west by New Haven, on the north by North Haven, and on the east by Branford, Lake Saltonstall, and North Branford. East Haven shares with New Haven the land belonging to local Tweed New Haven Airport and Alling Memorial Golf Course.

=== Geology ===
During the Paleozoic Era, 450 to 250 million years ago, several tectonic plates collided to form the supercontinent called Pangaea. East Haven was located in the middle of this collision, and the results can be seen today with the schists, gneisses and granites which are exposed.

When Pangaea was broken up, during the Triassic and Jurassic periods, volcanic activity occurred, depositing basalt or trap rock. Earthquakes can still be felt in the area. In February 2001 the area was rocked by a 1.8 magnitude earthquake originating in Madison, Connecticut.

It is estimated that Connecticut was covered by glaciers at least two times. The last glacier is estimated to have been 1,800 feet (550 m) thick in the New Haven area. 22,000 years ago, the glacier moved south, eroding mountains and pushing through East Haven to deposit large amounts of glacial till to form Long Island. 14,000 years ago the glacier retreated and shaped the coastline, formed Long Island Sound and created Lake Saltonstall. It also deposited glacial till, soil, sand, rocks and boulders that the ice carried south from the north.

The coast is primarily covered by gneiss rock (including granite), schist and quartzite. The remaining sections are part of the Central Valley of Connecticut and are covered with clastic sedimentary rock (redbeds, conglomerate, sandstone, brownstone and shale). This soft surface has been resedimented by a number of floods, making the soil soft and fertile and ideal for farmland.

Brownstone, a sedimentary rock that erodes easily, was easily dug into by glaciers and carved out many lakes and valleys. The area surrounding Farms River and Lake Saltonstall on the East Haven and Branford border is an example of this. The brownstone that did not erode was used for building foundations and rock fences found throughout New England.

Deposits of basalt (lava flow) can be found in the north and northeast sections of East Haven. Several quarries can be found in this area. Traprock (basalt) is turned into crushed stone. It is primarily used in construction and in the bedding of roads. Sand and gravel from glacial till is the second most profitable quarried rock. They are used as fill, in concrete, leach fields or for road sand.

=== Animals and plants ===
When Pangaea was broken up, East Haven had forests. Dinosaurs, reptiles and mammals roamed the area. Dinosaur trackways like those found in Rocky Hill at Dinosaur State Park were recently found at a construction site near Lake Saltonstall. The tracks were made by Eubrontes. Fossils of Triassic period reptiles have been found in the area. Stegomus was covered with armor plates and looked similar to an armadillo. Several specimens are available for viewing at the local Yale New Haven Peabody Museum.

Today, East Haven is mostly covered with broadleaf, hardwood trees. There are a few conifer (evergreen) forests, mostly around Lake Saltonstall. Salt marshes are located in areas around Long Island Sound.

Dinosaurs were long ago succeeded by deer, coyotes, squirrels, foxes, chipmunks and rabbits. Garter snakes can be found in the area. Pheasants, grouse, ducks and wild turkeys can be found in East Haven, as well as cardinals, blue jays, warblers, crows, sparrows, parrots, woodpeckers and sea gulls. Trout can be found in the fresh water lakes. Bluefish, bass, flounder, blackfish, sand sharks, eels, lobsters, crabs and clams can be found in Long Island Sound.

== Communities ==
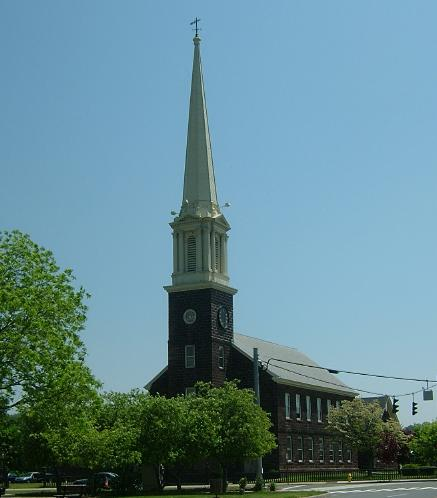
Old Stone Church

The residents of the town divide it into three large "sections" rather than smaller neighborhoods. These sections are:

=== Foxon ===
The area borders Branford and North Branford on the east, New Haven on the west to about Grannis Pond in the south, and surrounds State Route 80. This is the hilliest section of town. It counts among its landmarks the town high school, Foxon Park Beverage (a locally famous soda manufacturer), and Camp Murray, a Girl Scouts day camp. Grannis Pond used to host a YMCA camp until the land was sold and developed.

=== Momauguin ===
The area is located in the southern section of East Haven, from the Caroline Creek section of East Haven on the west to Branford on the east and starting at Short Beach Road in the north. This section includes the town beach, numerous condominiums, and summer cottages. The area near Tweed New Haven Airport has an industrial park that includes Town Fair Tire Centers Headquarters and Calabro Cheese Corporation.

=== "The Center" ===
The center is not the geographical center of town but the hub of the administrative facilities. Landmarks include the Town Hall, Fire Department Headquarters, Hagaman Memorial Library, the "old" East Haven High School, and other administrative buildings. The old high school has been adapted for use by the East Haven Historical Society, and a teen center. The Police Department and Public Works Department reside on the "Center" – Foxon line.

The most recognizable landmark in East Haven is the Old Stone Church. Built in 1774, the steeple of the church stands out against the low horizon.

The Town Green is a 2.4-acre (9,700 m^{2}) park located at the eastern end of the central business district (two blocks east of the town hall) and is mostly covered by trees. Monuments are dedicated to honor war veterans and firefighters. The focal point of the green is the gazebo or bandstand. The Green is the site of the annual East Haven Fall Festival and summer concerts.

Margaret Tucker Park is considered the second East Haven Green, with its location across the street from Town Hall and the Old Stone Church. They have developed additional land to the park, along with a water fountain.

Included in this section is the "West End", which borders New Haven. Since the late 20th century, conditions have declined in this area of older housing. Efforts are underway to revitalize the area that most residents think have been overlooked with all the focus of the re-development efforts in the center of town.

The Senior Center is located one block from Town Hall. The town has a weekly Farmers' Market held at the Town Hall on Sundays. This market features fresh produce, flowers, baked goods and crafts. Some weeks feature fundraising for town institutions.

== Climate ==
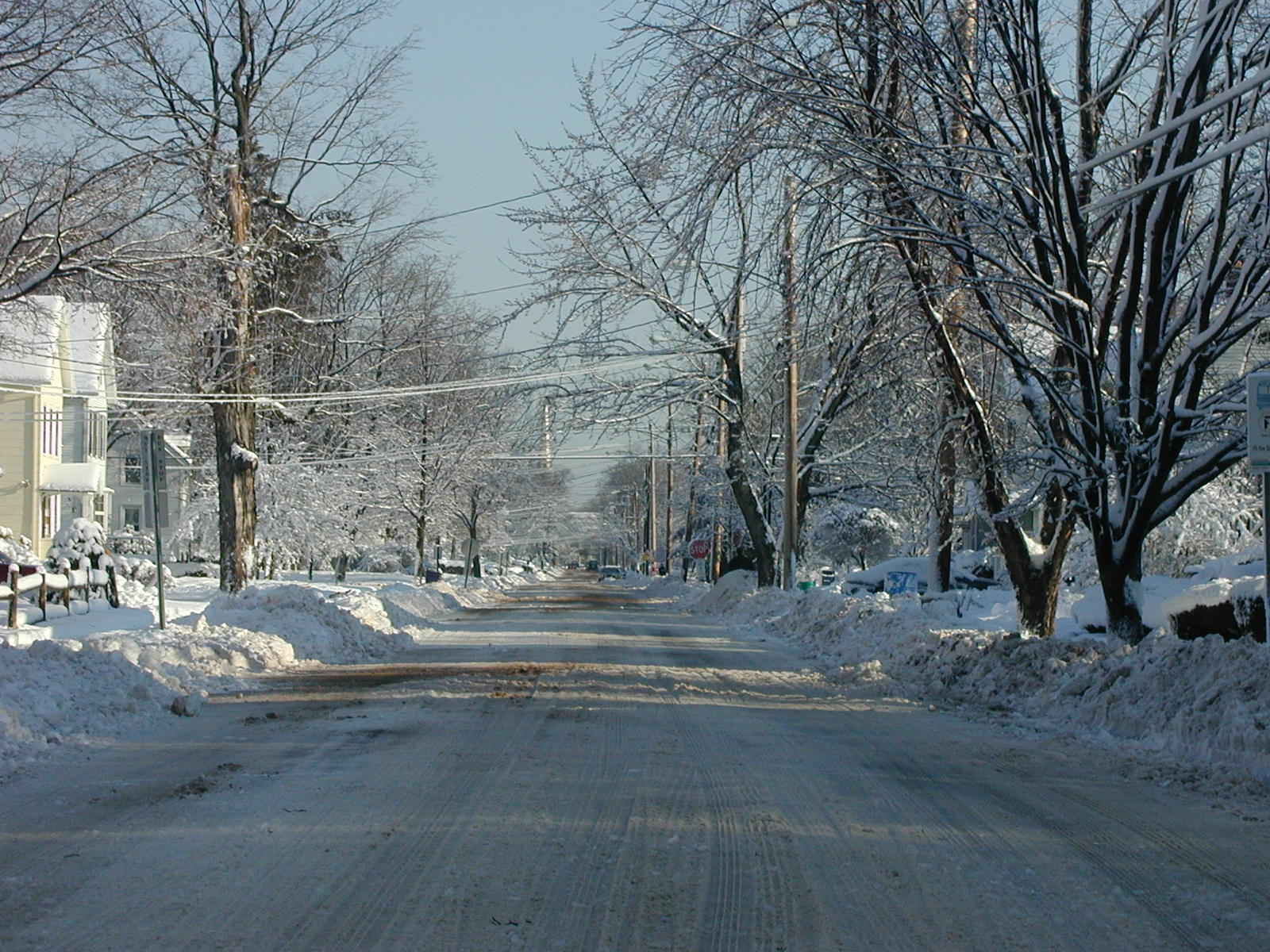
Looking north on Thompson Avenue in February 2001. The steeple of the Old Stone Church can be seen in the center of the photo.

East Haven's climate is tempered by its location on Long Island Sound; it has a humid subtropical climate according to the Koppen climate system. Winters are usually mild, with less snow accumulation, than those found inland. In a normal winter East Haven averages 27 inches (68.58 cm) of snowfall. It is not unusual to have a dusting of snow by the coast and an inch of snowfall in the northern areas of East Haven. The town is vulnerable to Nor'easter weather systems that can drop heavy rain or snow in the region. The Blizzard of 1888 dropped about 40 inches of snow, while the Blizzard of 1978 dropped almost 2 feet (0.61 m).

Summers are warming with hotter days, though cooler than inland. Though rare, the region does experience high heat waves and some 100 °F (38 °C) days. Precipitation is evenly spread throughout the year.

East Haven enjoys a fairly long growing season with the last frost occurring in mid April and the first frost occurring in mid October. On average, East Haven has 207 sunny days and 158 cloud or rainy days.

Severe weather does occur in East Haven. The area has been hit by several hurricanes, most recently in August 2011 when Hurricane Irene severely damaged numerous shore areas, destroying houses along Cosey Beach. In 1985, the eye of Hurricane Gloria came across state 22 west of East Haven. The area was without electricity, telephone and cable TV service for 7 days.

Tornadoes sometimes occur in Connecticut. Though the town was not directly affected, a tornado touched down in Hamden on July 10, 1989, 7 miles (11 km) away. On August 11, 2016, a tornado touched down in North Haven, 5 miles (8 km) away.

Climate data for East Haven
Month	Jan	Feb	Mar	Apr	May	Jun	Jul	Aug	Sep	Oct	Nov	Dec	Year
Mean daily maximum °F (°C)	35.4 (1.9)	38.7 (3.7)	48.0 (8.9)	59.5 (15.3)	70.9 (21.6)	79.3 (26.3)	83.8 (28.8)	81.3 (27.4)	73.0 (22.8)	62.1 (16.7)	50.7 (10.4)	39.6 (4.2)	60.3 (15.7)
Mean daily minimum °F (°C)	18 (−8)	19.2 (−7.1)	27.3 (−2.6)	36.3 (2.4)	46.8 (8.2)	55.8 (13.2)	61.0 (16.1)	59.2 (15.1)	51.3 (10.7)	39.7 (4.3)	28.6 (−1.9)	22.8 (−5.1)	39.0 (3.9)
Average precipitation inches (mm)	3.7 (95)	3.7 (94)	4.1 (105)	3.7 (94)	3.7 (95)	3.3 (84)	4.0 (101)	4.2 (107)	3.6 (91)	3.5 (88)	3.7 (95)	3.8 (97)	45.1 (1,145)
Average precipitation days (≥ 0.1 mm)	10	8	10	14	11	9	9	8	7	8	9	9	109
Source: Weatherbase,

== Demographics ==
Historical population
Census	Pop.	Note	%±
1820	1,237		—
1850	2,987		—
1860	2,292		−23.3%
1870	2,714		18.4%
1880	3,057		12.6%
1890	955		−68.8%
1900	1,167		22.2%
1910	1,795		53.8%
1920	3,520		96.1%
1930	7,815		122.0%
1940	9,094		16.4%
1950	12,212		34.3%
1960	21,388		75.1%
1970	25,120		17.4%
1980	25,036		−0.3%
1990	26,144		4.4%
2000	28,189		7.8%
2010	29,257		3.8%
2020	27,923		−4.6%
U.S. Decennial Census

As of the census of 2020, there were 27,923 people and 11,028 households residing in the town. The population density was 2,270.9 inhabitants per square mile (876.8/km^{2}).

The total gender makeup of the town is 13,599 (48.7%) male and 14,324 (51.3%) female. Age distribution of the estimated 2020 population of the town is as follows:

- ages 0 to 4 years old – 1,088 (3.9%)
- ages 5 to 17 years old – 4,803 (17.2%)
- ages 18 to 64 years old – 16,573 (58.9%)
- ages 65 and above – 5,459 (20.0%)

The racial makeup of the town is 78.6% White, followed by 13.4% Hispanic or Latino, 5.2% African American, 2.1% Asian, .7% from other races and 0.1% Native American.

The median age of a house is 40.0 years. The median house purchase price is $262,600.00 and median monthly rental is $1,342.00.

Voter registration and party enrollment as of October 31, 2024
Party	Active Voters	Inactive Voters	Total Voters	Percentage
Democratic	5,569	309	5,878	31.39%
Republican	3,954	156	4,110	21.95%
Minor Parties	256	21	277	1.48%
Unaffiliated	8,035	425	8,460	45.18%
Total	17,814	911	18,725	100%

Republican Presidential Candidate Donald Trump won East Haven in the past three elections; receiving 54.25% of the vote in 2016, 52.22% in 2020, and 55.3% in 2024. Democrat Barack Obama won the town in 2008 with 55.69% of the vote and in 2012 with 57.80%. Although the town has recently voted Republican at the federal level, Democratic mayor Joseph Carfora was reelected to a third term by a large margin in 2023.

The median income for a household in the town was $83,489. About 7.3% of the population were below the poverty line.

92.3% of the adult population (25 years and older) possess a high school diploma or higher, and 23.6% have bachelor's degree or higher.

== Geography ==
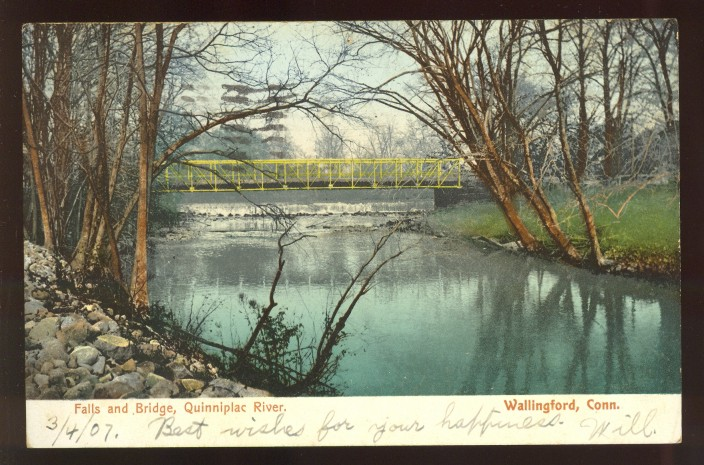
Quinnipiac River in East Haven, 1907

According to the United States Census Bureau, the town has a total area of 39.9 square miles (103.3 km^{2}), of which 39.0 square miles (101.1 km^{2}) is land and 0.9 square mile (2.2 km^{2}), or 2.16%, is water.

The town of East Haven sits astride the Quinnipiac River in southeastern New Haven County. It is 5 miles (8 km) south of Northford and approximately 1.3 miles (2.1 km) north of New Haven. Towns bordering East Haven are Branford, North Branford New Haven, and North Haven. East Haven is traversed by Route 1, I-95, and State Highways Route 100, Route 142 and Route 80

East Haven has a labor force of 16,244; 15,591 are employed and 653 are not. East Haven has an unemployment rate of 4.0%. There are 527 work units in East Haven, employing 6,260 staff members.

== Government ==
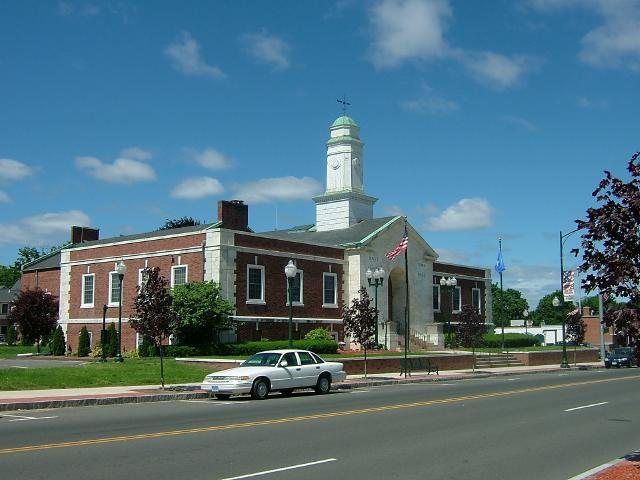
East Haven Town Hall

=== Town Government ===
Beginning in the late 1990s, Republican Joe Maturo, Jr. served as mayor for a decade, being repeatedly re-elected to the two-year terms, serving from 1997 to 2007. In 1998 he appointed Leonard Gallo as Police Chief, who served until January 2012.

Maturo was defeated on November 6, 2007, by Democratic challenger, April Capone Almon, by an apparent 21 votes. The slim margin of victory forced an automatic recount, and two were required. On November 14, 2007, Capone Almon was certified as the winner over Maturo by 25 votes. She was the first female mayor of East Haven and the youngest at age 32. She was re-elected in 2009, serving for two terms. After receiving a preliminary report in 2010 of a Department of Justice investigation of police department mistreatment of Latino residents, she put Police Chief Gallo on administrative leave pending completion of the investigation. That year a separate class action civil rights suit was filed on behalf of Latino residents against the city by Yale Law School’s Worker and Immigrant Rights Advocacy Clinic, naming 20 defendants, most with the police department.

Former mayor Joe Maturo had defeated incumbent mayor Almon on November 8, 2011, by an apparent 31 votes. The slim margin of victory forced an automatic recount. On November 12, 2011, Maturo was certified as the winner over Almon by 34 votes. By winning a sixth term, Maturo became the longest-serving mayor in the town's history. In 2013, Maturo easily defeated Jack Stacey to earn a seventh term.

Joe Maturo retired after his term ended in 2019. 2019 election saw Democratic Candidate Joseph Carfora defeat Republican candidate Steve Tracey and Independent candidate Bonifacio Sioson, 3865 votes to 3169 and 292 respectively. Joseph Carafora was elected to a second term when he defeated Republican challenger Salvatore Maltese 4208 votes to 1866 votes.

Based on the separate 2010 class action civil rights suit, the city reached a settlement in June 2014 to pay $450,000 to the Latino class members and change immigration enforcement to clearly separate it from regular policing. The city "will no longer detain undocumented people for immigration authorities unless they have a judge-signed criminal warrant." The city admitted no wrongdoing.

The 2006 Mill Rate was 31.20. Total revenue in 2022 was $117,049,457 with total expenditures of $123,548,617.00 for an overbudget total of $26,808,566. Total Indebtedness was $38,493,587. Moody's Bond rating (2019) for the town was A3 and Standards and Poor A.

Mayors of East Haven
	Mayor	Years served
1	Francis W. Messina (R)	1969–1975
2	Anthony Proto (D)	1975–1985
3	Robert M. Norman (R)	1985–1991
4	Henry J. Luzzi (D)	1991–1997
5	Joseph Maturo, Jr. (R)	1997–2007
6	April Capone Almon (D)	2007–2011
7	Joseph Maturo, Jr. (R)	2011–2019
8	Joe Carfora (D)	2019–

Presidential Election Results
Year	Democratic	Republican	Third Parties
2020	46.6% 6,757	52.2% 7,572	1.2% 172
2016	42.8% 5,425	54.2% 6,867	3.0% 365
2012	57.8% 6,533	41.1% 4,650	1.1% 119
2008	55.7% 6,878	42.8% 5,287	1.5% 185
2004	52.2% 6,196	45.7% 5,427	2.1% 242
2000	63.4% 7,278	30.5% 3,499	6.1% 694
1996	60.1% 6,603	26.8% 2,946	13.1% 1,426
1992	41.4% 5,645	34.8% 4,747	23.8% 3,248
1988	42.1% 4,432	55.2% 5,804	2.7% 287
1984	36.7% 4,124	62.9% 7,075	0.4% 33
1980	37.0% 3,942	55.1% 5,870	7.9% 835
1976	46.5% 4,974	52.6% 5,633	0.9% 86
1972	31.2% 3,352	67.4% 7,231	1.4% 146
1968	46.9% 4,630	41.3% 4,083	11.8% 1,156
1964	70.7% 7,008	29.3% 2,912	0.00% 0
1960	58.8% 5,831	41.2% 4,085	0.00% 0
1956	32.6% 2,800	67.4% 5,802	0.00% 0

== Emergency services ==
=== Police Department ===
The East Haven Police Department employs over 50 uniformed officers. Since the late 20th century, the department has been the center of incidents related to racial harassment and profiling of minorities.

In 1997, an East Haven police officer, Sergeant Robert Flodquist, was accused of using excessive force in a police action which killed Malik Jones, an African-American suspect. Subsequently, state and federal prosecutors failed to find enough evidence for criminal charges against Flodquist. His shooting of Jones was ruled justified; Flodquist testified in the investigation that Jones tried to run him over. Police Chief Leonard Gallo, who had been hired in 1998 from New Haven by Mayor Joseph A. Maturo, Jr., appointed Flodquist as the department's public spokesman.

Neither the family nor civil rights activists were satisfied with the failure by the state and federal government to prosecute in the Jones case. Activists have used the case "to argue successfully for new state legislation aimed at limiting racial profiling" by local and state police departments.

The Jones family filed a civil suit in US District Court, saying that Malik Jones civil rights were violated and seeking damages. In July 2003 a federal jury ruled in their favor and awarded them $2.5 million in punitive damages. Because in such a case the city was not liable for punitive damages, another hearing was held to settle whether there should be compensatory damages; the award was reduced in October 2010 to $900,000. The East Haven city attorney said the town intended to appeal this decision.

Separately, in September 2009, the U.S. Department of Justice (DOJ) began investigating the East Haven Police for racial profiling and harassment of Latinos following the "unwarranted arrest" of Father Paul Manship, a Catholic priest who was trying to study complaints by Latino parishioners that they were victims of police discrimination. That year the police arrested Mayor April Capone Almon and her assistant for allegedly interfering with a ticketing action at the beach. The DOJ investigation later reported having found that records related to Capone Almon's arrest and that of Manship had been altered numerous times.

With civil and criminal investigations underway, DOJ issued a preliminary report to the city in 2010, saying that the police appeared to have a pattern of discrimination and harassment against Latinos. Mayor April Capone Almon put Police Chief Leonard Gallo (in office since 1998) on administrative leave until the investigation was concluded.

After Joseph A. Maturo, Jr. was elected as mayor in November 2011, he reinstated Gallo. On his first day, the police chief barred police commission members, who were investigating an officer about whom they had received complaints, from police headquarters and the parking lot without his permission. A few days later, the commission established a policy requiring its members be given free access to the police headquarters and any members of the department.

The Department of Justice submitted its "scathing" final report of the civil investigation to the city in December 2011, saying the police department had shown a pattern of discrimination against Latinos, and Gallo had "resisted efforts to root out problems." Its report concluded that "EHPD has engaged in a pattern or practice of discrimination against Latinos, a violation of the Constitution and federal law."

On January 24, 2012, Sergeant John Miller and three officers were arrested by the FBI on a ten-count indictment, on charges of conspiracy, false arrest, and excessive force and obstruction of justice in connection with the investigation. A local businessman had complained to the mayor's office that the officers stopped his employees to check their documentation as they entered and left his place of business. Numerous other charges were detailed in the indictment. Numerous other complaints had been collected. Press reports indicated a suspicion among the investigators that the chief of the department, Leonard Gallo, was involved in obstructing justice and had tried to hinder the investigation.

Several other East Haven officers attended the arraignment to show support. Mayor Joseph Maturo and the police union also stood by the officers pending results of prosecution. The government asked that Officer Dennis Spaulding be barred from entering the town for fear he would intimidate possible witnesses; officer Zullo was also barred from the town until the cases were resolved. Police Chief Leonard Gallo was allowed to resign in late January 2012.

In September 2012, Miller pleaded guilty to having struck a handcuffed person. In October 2012, Officer Jason Zullo pleaded guilty to obstruction of justice under a deal that will require him to serve one or two years in jail. David Cari continued to fight the charges.

Maturo replaced police chief Gallo with Brent Larrabee, formerly the police chief of Stamford. On October 23, 2012, the Associated Press reported that the city had reached a settlement with the DOJ on its "claims that officers engaged in a pattern of discrimination and abuse toward Latinos." The settlement required actions in seven major areas to improve conditions, including policy and training related to search and seizure, management and supervision of officers, civilian control and resolution of complaints, racial sensitivity training, community outreach and development of trust with all residents.

Convicted at trial in October 2013, on January 23, 2014, Officer Dennis Spaulding was sentenced to five years in prison. At his sentencing, he insisted he had done nothing wrong. Cari was also convicted at trial; in January 2014 he was sentenced to two and a half years in prison.

=== Crime ===
Type	-1980-	-1985-	-1990-	-1995-	-2000-	-2001-	-2002-	-2003-	-2004-	-2005-	-2006-	-2007-	-2008-	-2009-	-2010-	-2011-	-2012-	-2013-	-2014-	-2015-	-2016-	-2017-	-2018-	-2019-
Murders	1	0	0	0	1	0	0	0	1	0	1	0	0	0	0	0	1	0	0	3	0	0	1	0
Rapes	0	2	0	1	3	7	11	7	0	0	1	6	4	3	3	0	6	3	8	2	4	6	3	7
Robberies	16	15	27	24	15	23	23	17	15	21	17	26	22	18	20	12	15	12	11	8	14	23	8	11
Assaults	21	13	30	3	39	36	32	20	2	10	6	10	24	14	20	12	10	14	14	12	14	12	9	18
TOTAL Violent Crimes	38	30	57	28	58	66	66	44	18	31	25	42	50	35	43	24	32	29	33	25	32	41	21	36
Burglaries	369	158	194	212	115	108	126	74	75	93	99	123	121	147	119	117	166	95	110	101	101	75	60	58
Larceny	724	630	615	872	467	549	561	480	422	470	386	513	590	500	744	611	642	558	506	506	458	607	593	454
Auto Thefts	111	78	156	169	80	104	103	84	96	127	96	107	108	71	81	107	67	101	101	40	98	70	99	60
Arson	na	na	na	na	2	2	2	5	0	4	5	2	3	0	1	4	4	na	na	0	1	0	1	0
TOTAL Property Crimes	1204	866	965	1253	664	760	792	643	593	694	581	743	819	718	944	835	875	754	717	647	657	607	593	572

2019 is the last reported year. Statistics are published yearly by the FBI.

=== East Haven Fire Department ===
The East Haven Fire Department was established in 1900. It was started as an all volunteer fire department with one engine company. The town is covered by four fire stations:

- Station 1 (Headquarters Center District)
- Station 3 (Foxon)
- Station 4 (Momauguin)
- Station 6 (Short Beach Road)

In total there are three active engines, one quint, two squads and four rescues. There are both career and volunteer firefighters within the department.

== Economy ==
Retail services dominate three stretches of roads in East Haven; Main Street and Route 1 in the center of town and State Route 80 in the Foxon Section. East Haven has two industrial parks on land adjacent to Tweed New Haven Airport which house many manufacturing and distribution companies.

There are approximately 527 companies that employ 6,260 employees in East Haven. The top five employers are Super Stop & Shop, Thermatool Corporation, Village at Mariners Point (healthcare), Laurel Woods (healthcare) and Talmadge Park Health Care.

== Education ==
=== Schools ===
Education in the New Haven Colony was important. The colony had required that each parish provide a common school. Prior to 1700, the parish education was being provided by the Congregational Church. The town voted in 1706 to build the first public school. The school was located around what is now 260 Hemingway Avenue. In 1707 the town established a school board to oversee the education system. By 1728 East Haven had split their system into 4 school districts.

The first town high school was opened on September 28, 1936, in the "Center" of town. Prior to the building of the high school, students had to apply to local town high schools for acceptance into their school system. A new junior high school complex was built in 1957. In 1997, a new high school campus was built in the Foxon section of town.

Today the school system operates 9 schools. In 2014 there were 2,933 students enrolled in the East Haven Public School system, with 232 teachers for a student/teacher ratio of 13:1. The town's budget allocated for FY 2014 was $46,410,357.00. The cost per student was approximately $18,495.00 per student.

- Adult Learning Center
- Deer Run School enrolls 312 students and a student/teacher ratio of 14:1 in Grades K–2
- Grove J Tuttle School enrolls 178 students and a student/teacher ratio of 12:1 in Grades 3–5
- Momauguin School enrolls 147 students and a student/teacher ratio of 11:1 in Grades 3–5
- Dominick H. Ferrara School enrolls 178 students and a student/teacher ratio of 13:1 in Grades 3–5
- Overbrook School enrolls 183 students and a student/teacher ratio of 17:1 in Grades K–2
- Joseph Melillo Middle School enrolls 582 students and a student/teacher ratio of 12:1 in Grades 6–8
- East Haven Academy, located at Carbone School enrolls 265 students and a student/teacher ratio 13:1 in Grades 3–8
- East Haven High School enrolls 880 students and a student/teacher ratio of 13:1 in Grades 9–12

St. Vincent de Paul School in East Haven closed in 2016. That year enrollment was 89.

=== Library ===
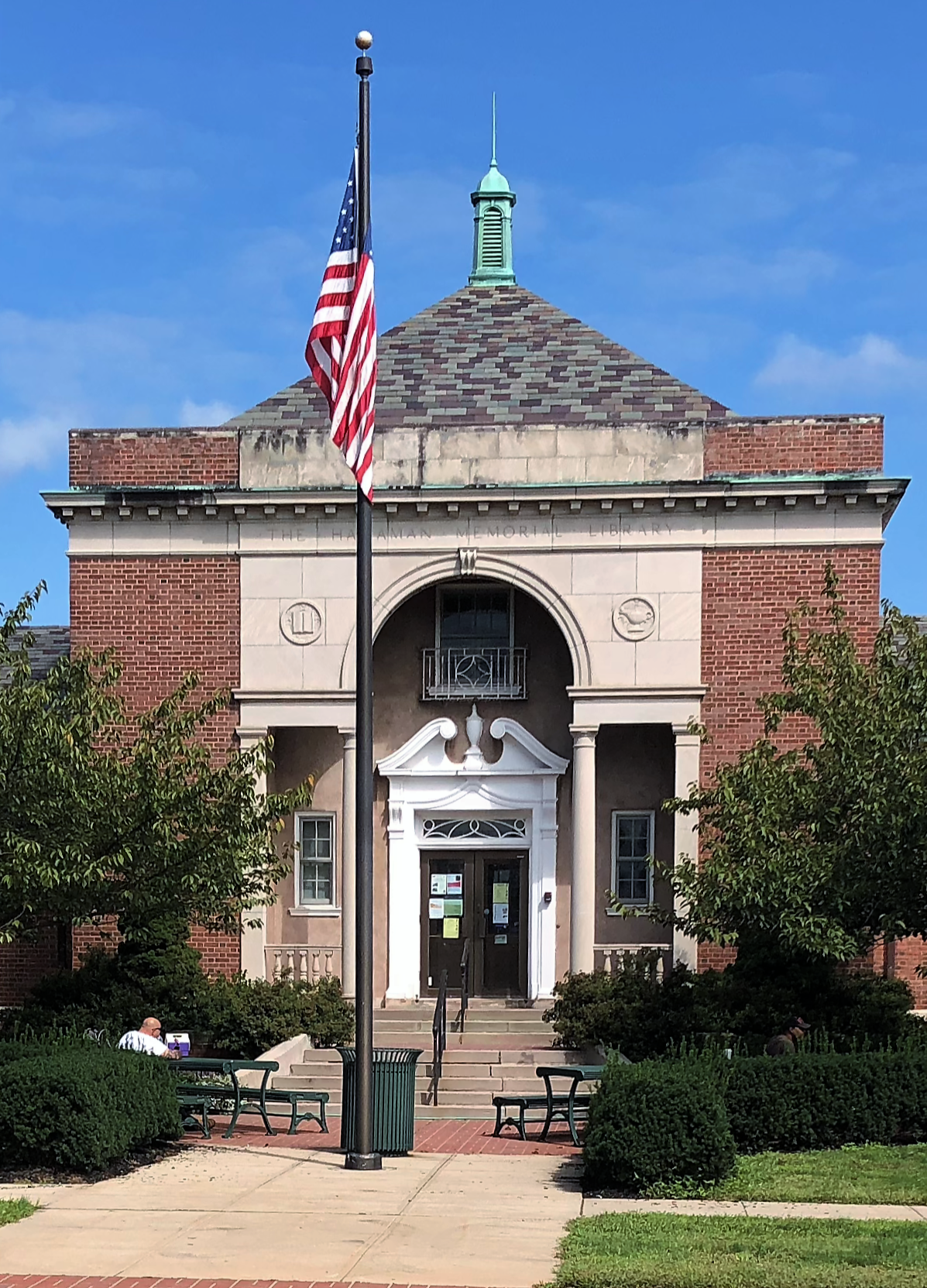
View from north of Main street.

The East Haven Library was established in 1909. The library occupied several locations in the center of town before a gift from Isaac Hagaman allowed for a permanent building to be built. On September 22, 1928, the East Haven Library was opened. During the years of 1973 and 1974, the library added a two-story addition to the complex. Today the Hagaman Memorial Library, named to honor of Isaac Hagaman, holds approximately 65,290 books, 2,065 Audio Materials, 4,128 Video Materials and 90 serial subscriptions. The library has an extensive children's library, and facilities are available for community meetings.

== Infrastructure ==
=== Health and medicine ===
East Haven does not have its own hospital; the area has several facilities within 3 to 5 miles (5 to 8 km) in New Haven: Yale-New Haven Hospital, a major teaching hospital affiliated with the Yale School of Medicine, Yale-New Haven Children's Hospital, and Yale-New Haven Psychiatric Hospital. A VA medical center is located in West Haven. An urgent care center is located in Foxon.

=== Transportation ===
East Haven is served by Tweed New Haven Regional Airport, which is located on the border between East Haven and New Haven.

Though East Haven does not have a train station, there are two stations within close driving distance. Union Station is located 3 miles (5 km) from the center of town in New Haven, and a commuter station is located an equal distance away in Branford. Both offer commuter railroad service to New York and to coastal Connecticut towns, and New Haven's Union Station has Amtrak train service to Boston and many other cities.

Interstate 95 runs from east to west through the central portion of East Haven. Interstate 91, which is located west of the town, connects with State Route 80 which passes through the town in Foxon, running east to west. State Route 100 connects Foxon with the town center, running north to south. Connecticut Route 1 crosses the town through the "Center", paralleling Interstate 95.

The Connecticut Transit Bus Company, a state-run mass transportation system, serves the town.

=== Utilities ===
Water supply is provided by the Regional Water Authority. Lake Saltonstall, located on the border between East Haven and Branford, provides drinking water to the south section of East Haven and is a recreational facility for hiking and fishing. The northern section of town is served by Lake Gaillard in North Branford. The New Haven Regional Water Pollution Control Authority is responsible for sewage-disposal services with facilities located in New Haven.

United Illuminating is the exclusive distributor of electric power to the town. Natural gas is distributed by the Southern Connecticut Gas Company with several sections being served by local propane distribution companies. AT&T is the primary wired telephone service provider for the area. Phone service is also available from various national wireless companies and the local cable television provider. Cable television is available from Comcast and AT&T. Satellite television is available from AT&T (Dish Network) and DirecTV.

== People and culture ==
=== Media and newspapers ===
- Newspapers: The town is served by one daily newspaper and two weekly newspapers. The New Haven Register is printed seven days a week. The East Haven Courier was a weekly paper until 2024.
- Media: The town is served by ETV, a local public-access television cable TV channel on the Comcast system. A local ABC affiliate is in New Haven, WTNH TV Channel 8 and New Haven's IntrigueTV WCCT TV Channel 34. East Haven can receive 16 on-air television channels, 13 AM radio stations, and 20 FM radio stations.

=== Museums ===
- East Haven Historical Society
- The Shore Line Trolley Museum was founded in 1945 as the Branford Electric Railway Association (BERA). The Branford Electric Railway Association was founded to preserve the heritage of the trolley car, as well as artifacts and documents from the trolley era. The museum holds nearly one hundred trolley vehicles. The Shore Line Trolley Museum, just past the East Haven Green, operates the Branford Electric Railway, a National Historic Site. The railway is the oldest continuously operating suburban trolley line in the United States.

=== National Register of Historic Places ===
East Haven has three nationally registered historic sites:

- East Haven Green Historic District (added April 11, 2002)
- First Congregational Church of East Haven (added March 25, 1982)
- The Shore Line Trolley Museum (added May 23, 2019)

=== Town events ===
- Every fifth year the town hosts the Columbus Day Parade (which is shared between New Haven, West Haven, North Haven, and Hamden).
- The town of East Haven sponsors a town-wide beach party to celebrate Independence Day.
- The town also hosts the Fall Festival, which is patterned after a New England town fair.

== Notable people ==
- Cy Bentley (1850–1872), Major League Baseball player for one season with the Middletown Mansfields, born in East Haven
- Kori Gardner and Jason Edward Hammel of the pop music duo Mates of State
- Henry Winkler, actor and director who played "The Fonz" on the hit show Happy Days, resided in the Momauguin area of East Haven while he attended the Yale School of Drama.
- Tariq Farid, founder of Edible Arrangements, LLC, launched the first Edible Arrangements, LLC store in East Haven, CT in 1999.
- Matt DelGuidice (born 1967), former National Hockey League goaltender, played for East Haven High School.
