= Sean Monahan =

Canadian ice hockey player (born 1994)

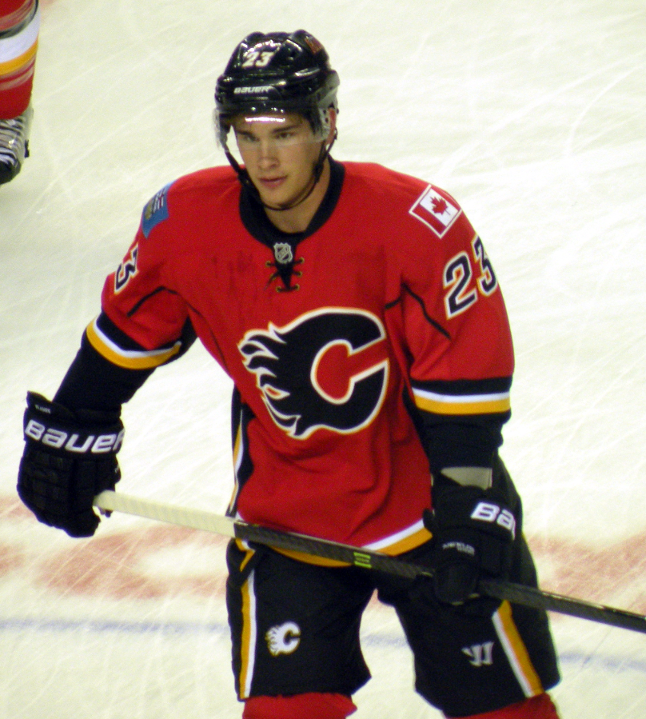
- Monahan with the Calgary Flames in 2013
- Born: October 12, 1994 (age 32) Brampton, Ontario, Canada
- Height: 6 ft 2 in (188 cm)
- Weight: 202 lb (92 kg; 14 st 6 lb)
- Position: Centre
- Shoots: Left
- NHL team Former teams: Columbus Blue Jackets; Calgary Flames; Montreal Canadiens; Winnipeg Jets
- National team: Canada
- NHL draft: 6th overall, 2013; Calgary Flames
- Playing career: 2013–present

Sean Monahan (born October 12, 1994) is a Canadian professional ice hockey player who is a centre and alternate captain for the Columbus Blue Jackets of the National Hockey League (NHL).

After playing junior ice hockey with the Ottawa 67's of the Ontario Hockey League (OHL) and serving as team captain, Monahan was selected sixth overall by the Calgary Flames in the 2013 NHL entry draft, and played nine seasons with the Flames before subsequent trades to the Montreal Canadiens and Winnipeg Jets.

== Early life ==
A native of Brampton, Ontario, Monahan is the son of Cathy and John, and has an older sister, Jacqueline. He attended St. Thomas Aquinas Secondary School and played minor hockey and lacrosse for the Brampton Excelsiors, where one of his teammates was former Syracuse and NBA point guard Tyler Ennis.

== Playing career ==
=== Junior ===
Monahan played with the Mississauga Rebels of the Greater Toronto Hockey League (GTHL). As a 15-year-old in 2010, he captained the Rebels to an OHL Cup title and was named most valuable player of the tournament. He finished the 2009–10 season with 46 goals and 40 assists in 47 games for the Rebels and was then selected by the Ottawa 67's in the first round, 16th overall, at the Ontario Hockey League (OHL) Priority Selection Draft. Monahan's junior hockey career began with difficulty as he suffered a sprained wrist in his first training camp with the 67's, resulting in a slow start for him in the 2010–11 season. An invitation to play in the 2011 World U-17 Hockey Challenge, in which he was a key performer for the gold medal-winning Team Ontario, allowed Monahan to regain confidence; he completed his first OHL season on the 67's second line and recorded 47 points in 65 games. Monahan played in his second international tournament following the season. He joined the Canadian Under-18 National Team for the 2011 Ivan Hlinka Memorial Tournament and scored a goal in the championship game to help Canada win a fourth consecutive gold medal at the event.

Playing alongside fellow National Hockey League (NHL) prospects Tyler Toffoli, Shane Prince and Cody Ceci, Monahan was one of the OHL's top scorers in the 2011–12 season. He finished tied for 15th in league scoring with 78 points. He was named to the OHL's Second All-Star team and was the 67's representative on the league's All-Scholastic team. Monahan's third season in Ottawa was a transitional one for the franchise. The 67's had won three consecutive East Division titles between 2010 and 2012, but the graduation of top players caused the team to enter a rebuilding phase. The 67's finished in last place in the 2012–13 season with just 16 wins. Monahan served as the team's captain, sharing the role with Ceci in the first half of the season until the latter player's departure in a trade. He finished the season with 31 goals and 78 points. He was invited to Team Canada's selection camp for the 2013 World Junior Ice Hockey Championships, but failed to make the team. He also missed ten games during the season after being suspended for an elbowing incident.

=== Calgary Flames ===
Monahan was one of the top-ranked prospects for the 2013 NHL entry draft. Collectively, the NHL Central Scouting Bureau ranked him as the fifth-best North American skater in its final ranking while International Scouting Services ranked him ninth overall. Among OHL draft prospects, the league's coaches rated Monahan highly for his intelligence on the ice, playmaking and stickhandling, and for his faceoff ability. He was selected in the first round, sixth overall, by the Calgary Flames. Upon his selection, the 18-year-old centre expressed his confidence that he was ready to immediately play in the NHL. He earned a spot on the Flames roster to begin the 2013–14 season and made his NHL debut on October 3, 2013, against the Washington Capitals. Monahan scored his first career point in the game, assisting on David Jones' goal in a 5–4 shootout loss. He then scored his first goal the following night against goaltender Sergei Bobrovsky of the Columbus Blue Jackets in a 4–3 win.

Though he remained eligible to return to junior without impacting his NHL contract, Monahan scored six goals in his first nine games to earn a permanent spot in Calgary. In doing so, he became the first junior-eligible player to make the full-time jump to the Flames roster since Kevin LaVallee 33 years prior. Monahan scored his 20th goal in a late-season loss to the Ottawa Senators, and in doing so, became the first Flames rookie to score 20 goals since Dion Phaneuf in 2005–06 and first rookie forward since Jarome Iginla in 1996–97 to reach the mark.

On August 19, 2016, following back-to-back seasons in which he scored 60 or more points, Monahan, as a restricted free agent signed a seven-year, $44.625 million contract extension to remain in the Flames' organization through 2023. During the 2016–17 season, Monahan scored his 100th career goal against Andrei Vasilevskiy of the Tampa Bay Lightning on February 23, 2017. He is the sixth-youngest active player to achieve the milestone, joining the elite company of Alexander Ovechkin, Sidney Crosby, Jaromír Jágr, Steven Stamkos, and Patrick Kane. His 100th goal also marked his 20th of the season, marking the 4 consecutive season he has scored at least 20 goals. He was the youngest player in Flames' history to reach the 100-goal milestone (22 years, 134 days), passing Joe Nieuwendyk, who was 22 years and 185 days old when he scored 100th career goal.

On November 18, 2017, in a game against the Philadelphia Flyers, Monahan scored his first career hat-trick in the second period to help the Flames win 5–4. He became the fastest player in NHL history to record nine career overtime goals when he scored his ninth on December 7, 2017, against the Montreal Canadiens in a 3–2 win. However, his season was cut short in March due to injuries. During the following month, Monahan underwent four surgeries but was expected to be able to play during the 2018–19 season.

During the 2021–22 season, with the Flames in the midst of a resurgent season and leading the Pacific Division, Monahan was playing in a reduced role and on pace for a career-low in points-per-game. On April 2, 2022, after recording 8 goals and 23 points through 65 regular season games, it was announced he would undergo season-ending surgery on his right hip. Monahan later reflected on his final season with the Flames, relating "I tore the labrum of my other hip three games into last season and kept playing. Later on, I suffered three fractured ribs. They were protruding out of my back and it was brutal. There were days where I don't even know what I was doing practicing because I couldn't even tie my own skates."

=== Montreal Canadiens ===
On August 18, 2022, Monahan was traded, along with a conditional first-round pick in 2025 to the Montreal Canadiens in exchange for future considerations. The Flames made the trade in order to create salary cap room to sign free agent Nazem Kadri. Monahan made his debut in the Canadiens' season-opening game on October 12, and scored his first goal for the team that night in what proved to be a 4–3 victory over traditional archrival the Toronto Maple Leafs. The occasion coincided with his birthday. Defying some expectations regarding his physical capabilities post-surgery, Monahan enjoyed a revival in his first two months with the Canadiens. In his return to Calgary on December 1, Monahan assisted on both of the team's goals in a 2–1 victory over the Flames, despite being in a walking boot prior as a result of a foot injury.

Days later, after scoring a goal in an away game against the Vancouver Canucks, he exited due to discomfort. It was initially announced that he would miss two to three weeks with a lower body injury. However, Monahan's absence from the roster dragged on for months, with it eventually being indicated that he had suffered a setback in rehab. He ultimately played only 25 games for the Canadiens that season. He revealed that playing on his broken foot had caused him to develop a groin injury as a result of compensating for it. When asked about the decision to keep playing through his foot injury, Monahan said "I regret it, for sure. But, at the end of the day, it was my choice and I really wanted to play that game against Calgary. Looking at it now, I regret it. But, at the same time, I can't change anything."

On June 20, 2023, Monahan signed a one-year extension with the Canadiens, with a salary of $1.985 million.

=== Winnipeg Jets ===
On February 2, 2024, Monahan was traded to the Winnipeg Jets in exchange for a first-round pick in the 2024 NHL entry draft as well as a conditional third-round pick in 2027.

=== Columbus Blue Jackets ===
On July 1, 2024, Monahan signed a five-year, $27.5 million contract with the Columbus Blue Jackets. He intended the move to be a reunion with former Calgary teammate and longtime friend Johnny Gaudreau, but this would not come to fruition when Gaudreau was killed by a drunk driver on August 29, the same day Monahan and his family had planned to depart for Columbus. Of Gaudreau, Monahan would later say: "We were looking forward to playing together again, of course. But we were both really excited to raise our kids together." The loss of Gaudreau significantly affected expectations for the Blue Jackets in the 2024–25 season, who had finished fourth-last the previous year. Despite this, the team would enjoy a strong season, with Monahan's performance as first-line centre credited as one of the keys to their success. He missed 28 games following a wrist injury in January 2025, but finished the season with 19 goals and 57 points in 54 games. The Blue Jackets ultimately narrowly missed qualification to the 2025 Stanley Cup playoffs, being the final team eliminated from contention for the Eastern Conference second wildcard. Monahan won the Bill Masterton Memorial Trophy, awarded by the Professional Hockey Writers Association to "the player who best exemplifies the qualities of perseverance, sportsmanship and dedication to hockey," citing him as "an inspiration amid the unspeakable tragedy of Gaudreau’s death." The trophy was presented to him by Gaudreau's widow Meredith.

== Career statistics ==
=== Regular season and playoffs ===
			Regular season					Playoffs
Season	Team	League	GP	G	A	Pts	PIM	GP	G	A	Pts	PIM
2010–11	Ottawa 67's	OHL	65	20	27	47	32	4	2	2	4	0
2011–12	Ottawa 67's	OHL	62	33	45	78	38	18	8	7	15	12
2012–13	Ottawa 67's	OHL	58	31	47	78	24	—	—	—	—	—
2013–14	Calgary Flames	NHL	75	22	12	34	8	—	—	—	—	—
2014–15	Calgary Flames	NHL	81	31	31	62	12	11	3	3	6	2
2015–16	Calgary Flames	NHL	81	27	36	63	18	—	—	—	—	—
2016–17	Calgary Flames	NHL	82	27	31	58	20	4	4	1	5	0
2017–18	Calgary Flames	NHL	74	31	33	64	24	—	—	—	—	—
2018–19	Calgary Flames	NHL	78	34	48	82	12	5	1	1	2	0
2019–20	Calgary Flames	NHL	70	22	26	48	25	10	2	6	8	2
2020–21	Calgary Flames	NHL	50	10	18	28	10	—	—	—	—	—
2021–22	Calgary Flames	NHL	65	8	15	23	24	—	—	—	—	—
2022–23	Montreal Canadiens	NHL	25	6	11	17	16	—	—	—	—	—
2023–24	Montreal Canadiens	NHL	49	13	22	35	10	—	—	—	—	—
2023–24	Winnipeg Jets	NHL	34	13	11	24	2	5	0	1	1	0
2024–25	Columbus Blue Jackets	NHL	54	19	38	57	20	—	—	—	—	—
2025–26	Columbus Blue Jackets	NHL	78	13	23	36	12	—	—	—	—	—
NHL totals			896	276	355	631	213	35	10	12	22	4

=== International ===
Year	Team	Event	Result	GP	G	A	Pts	PIM
2011	Canada Ontario	U17	1st place, gold medalist(s)	5	3	2	5	2
2011	Canada	IH18	1st place, gold medalist(s)	5	2	1	3	12
2014	Canada	WC	5th	7	0	2	2	2
Junior totals				10	5	3	8	14
Senior totals				7	0	2	2	2

== Awards and honours ==
Award	Year	Ref
Minor
OHL Cup champion	2010	
Tim Adams Memorial Trophy	2010	
International
World U-17 Hockey Challenge gold medal	2011	
OHL
Second Team All-Star	2012	
CHL
CHL/NHL Top Prospects Game	2013	
NHL
Bill Masterton Memorial Trophy	2025	

Awards and achievements
Preceded by Mark Jankowski	Calgary Flames' first-round draft pick 2013	Succeeded by Émile Poirier
Preceded by Connor Ingram	Bill Masterton Memorial Trophy; 2025	Succeeded by Gabriel Landeskog
