= Chandler Stephenson =

Canadian ice hockey player (born 1994)

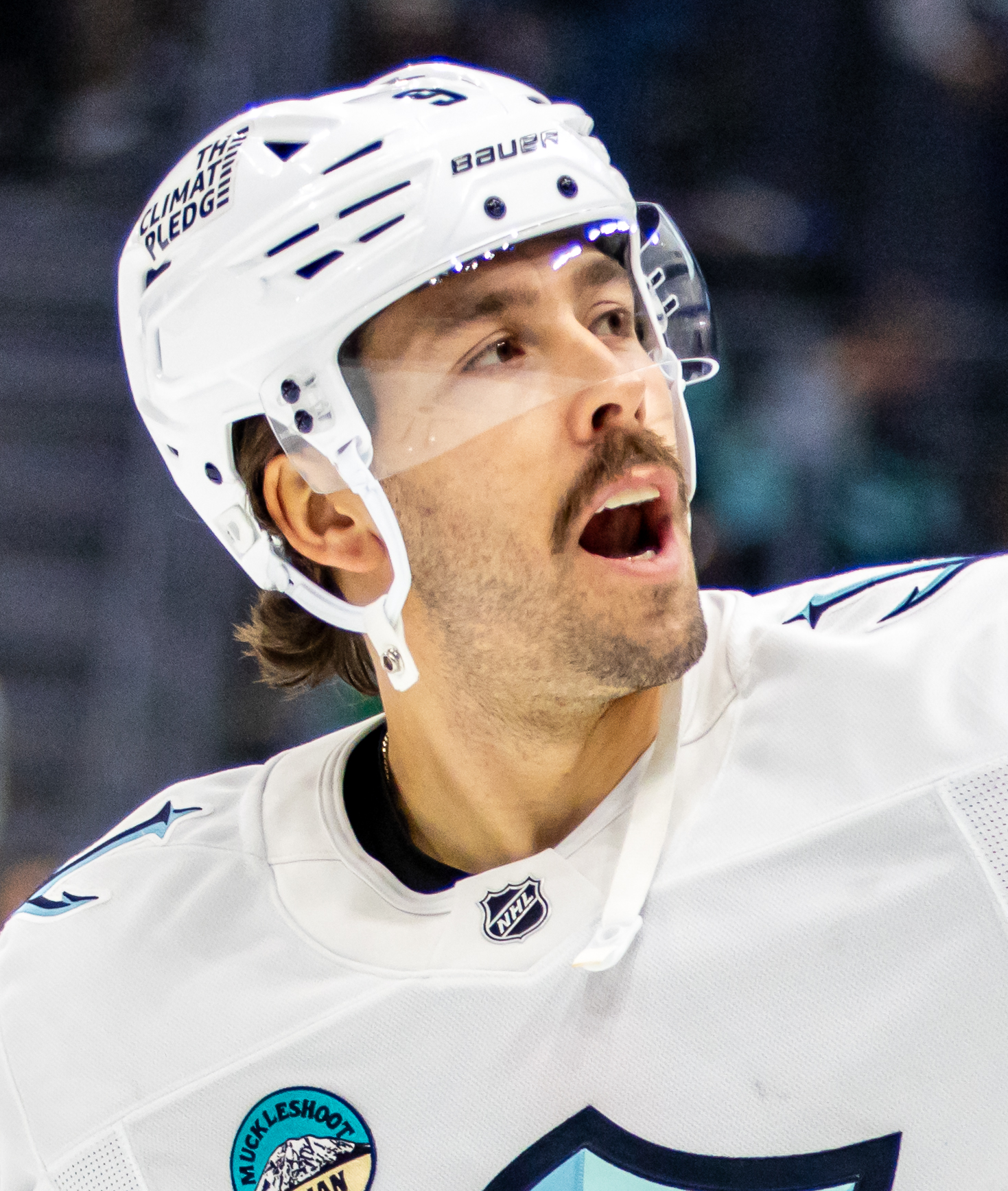
- Stephenson with the Seattle Kraken in 2024
- Born: April 22, 1994 (age 32) Saskatoon, Saskatchewan, Canada
- Height: 6 ft 0 in (183 cm)
- Weight: 201 lb (91 kg; 14 st 5 lb)
- Position: Forward
- Shoots: Left
- NHL team Former teams: Seattle Kraken; Washington Capitals; Vegas Golden Knights
- NHL draft: 77th overall, 2012; Washington Capitals
- Playing career: 2014–present

Chandler Stephenson (born April 22, 1994) is a Canadian professional ice hockey player who is a forward for the Seattle Kraken of the National Hockey League (NHL). He previously played for the Washington Capitals, who had drafted him in 2012, and the Vegas Golden Knights.

Born and raised in Saskatoon, Saskatchewan, Stephenson played with the Saskatoon Flyers and with the Saskatoon Contacts in the Saskatchewan Midget AAA Hockey League before joining the Regina Pats of the Western Hockey League. Following his rookie season with the Pats, Stephenson was selected by the Capitals in the third round (77th overall) of the 2012 NHL Entry Draft. He returned to the Pats for two more seasons where he broke out offensively and recorded career-highs in goals, assists, and points. Upon concluding the 2013–14 season, Stephenson signed a three-year entry-level contract with the Capitals and was immediately assigned to American Hockey League (AHL) affiliate, the Hershey Bears, on an amateur try-out.

Stephenson started his professional career with the Bears and played two full seasons with the team before making his NHL debut on October 15, 2015. Despite this, he continued to be a mainstay on the Bears lineup before joining the Capitals full time during the 2017–18 season. Stephenson later won the Stanley Cup as a member of the Capitals in 2018. In 2019, he was traded to the Vegas Golden Knights, where he experienced a breakout, setting career-highs in goals and points. He then won a second Stanley Cup in 2023.

== Early life ==
Stephenson was born on April 22, 1994, in Saskatoon, Saskatchewan, Canada, to parents Bev and Curt Stephenson. He was born into a hockey playing family, as his uncle Bob, and cousins Joe Kocur played at the National Hockey League (NHL) level, and cousins Logan Stephenson and Shay Stephenson played for international hockey leagues in Europe and Asia. Growing up, Stephenson played ringette with the Saskatoon Cobras before he was old enough to play ice hockey. Although his brother Colton also played ice hockey, he retired at the age of 19 after suffering his fifth diagnosed concussion.

== Playing career ==
=== Junior ===
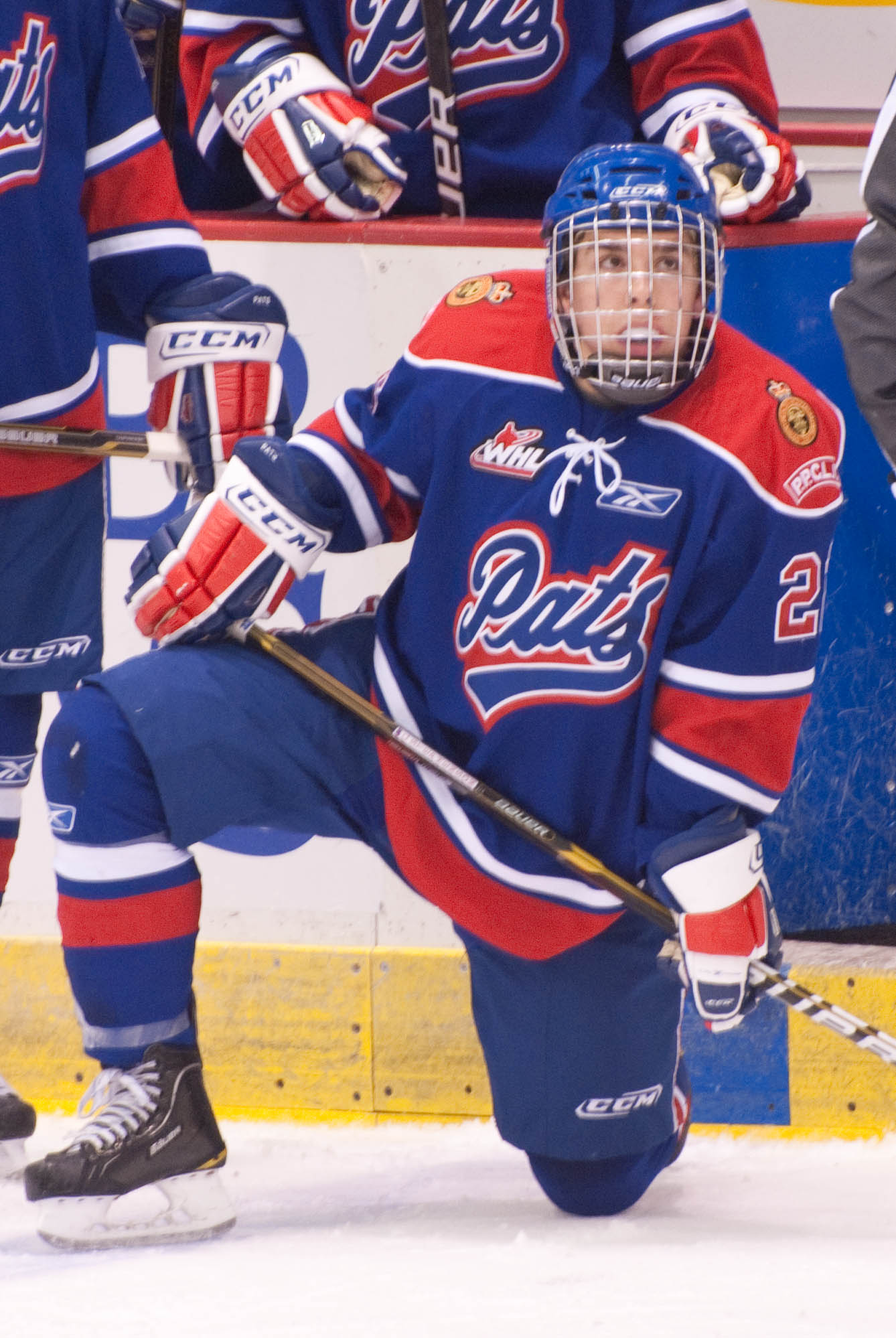
Stephenson with the Regina Pats in 2010

Growing up, Stephenson played with the Saskatoon Flyers and in the Saskatchewan Midget AAA Hockey League with the Saskatoon Contacts. At the age of 14, he was signed by his first hockey agent, a family friend named Brad Devine who also aided his brother. From 2006 to 2009, Stephenson played bantam hockey with the Saskatoon Generals of the Greater Saskatoon Hockey League.

As a result of his junior play, Stephenson was drafted fifth overall by the Regina Pats in the Western Hockey League's (WHL) 2009 Bantam Draft. During the offseason, Stephenson and his brother worked with a personal trainer, a skills coach, and power-skating instructors. He joined the team for his rookie season as a 16-year old and played alongside Thomas Frazee and Colin Reddin. As a rookie, he competed for Team West at the World U-17 Hockey Challenge, where he led the team in scoring with four goals and two assists before suffering a leg injury. The injury also caused him to miss his first five WHL games after the tournament ended. Upon returning to the lineup, Stephenson finished his rookie season with a total of seven goals and 20 points through 60 games. He was subsequently invited to participate at Team Canada’s National Men’s Summer Under-18 Team selection camp.

His productive play as a rookie and sophomore earned Stephenson high preseason rankings from various scouting services. He was ranked seventh overall amongst all WHL skaters from the NHL Central Scouting Bureau and third in the world from ISS Hockey's preseason rankings. By December, he had surpassed his previous seasons point total and was invited to participate in the 2012 CHL/NHL Top Prospects Game. Stephenson finished his sophomore season with 22 goals and 42 points through 55 games, despite missing six weeks with a knee injury. He also helped the Pats qualify for the WHL Playoffs for the first time in four years, where he recorded one goal and three assists in five post-season games. As such, he earned a final NHL Central Scouting Bureau ranking of 3third amongst Canadian Hockey League (CHL) players. Stephenson was eventually drafted in the third round, 77th overall, by the Washington Capitals in the 2012 NHL entry draft.

Following the draft, Stephenson increased his point total and finished the season with 14 goals and 31 assists for 45 points through 46 games. The following season, Stephenson broke out offensively and recorded career-highs in goals, assists, and points as he played his first full season. He finished the 2013–14 season with 30 goals and 59 assists for 89 points through 69 games. Stephenson led the Pats in points and had the teams' highest plus-minus rating with a plus-27. With his assistance, the Pats finished second in the Eastern Conference and won the East Division title.

=== Professional ===
==== Washington Capitals (2015–2019) ====
Upon concluding the 2013–14 season with the Pats, Stephenson signed a three-year entry-level contract with the Capitals on April 12, 2014. He was immediately assigned to American Hockey League (AHL) affiliate, the Hershey Bears, on an amateur try-out. He made his AHL debut on April 16, 2014, against the Norfolk Admirals and scored his first career AHL goal on his first shot in the first period. Following this, he was invited to participate in the Capitals 2014 rookie camp but was returned to the AHL for the 2014–15 season. During his time at camp, head coach Barry Trotz placed him on a second line alongside Nathan Walker and Kevin Elgestål. In his first full season in the AHL, Stephenson was used in a checking role where he tallied seven goals and seven assists.

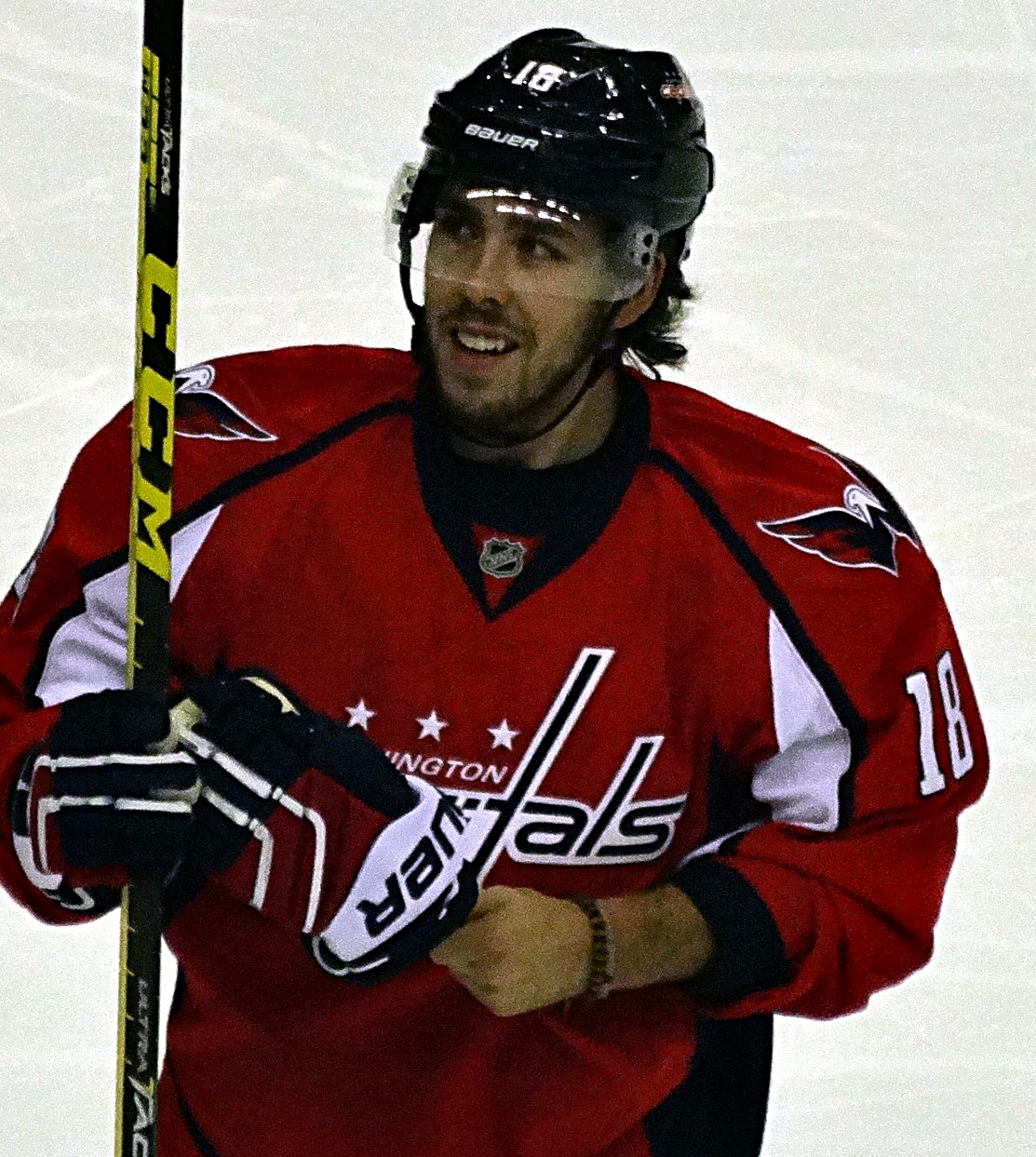
Stephenson in October 2015 during a game against the Pittsburgh Penguins

The following season, Stephenson was again returned to the AHL for the 2015–16 season after attending the Capitals rookie camp. He earned his first NHL recall on October 15, 2015, after registering one assist. In his first two games with the Capitals Stephenson averaged 9 minutes and 24 seconds of ice time per game and won 9 of the 15 faceoffs. In his second game, Stephenson played on the fourth line alongside Brooks Laich and André Burakovsky. He played a total of nine games with the Capitals before being returned to the Hershey Bears. Upon rejoining the Bears, Stephenson continued to produce and concluded the season with a career-high 21 assists and 28 points.

Stephenson spent the majority of the 2016–17 season with the Hershey Bears, only being recalled for four games at the NHL level. His first recall in January came after he had recorded 23 points in 36 games and was tied for third on the team in assists and fifth in points. As a result of his limited recalls, Stephenson finished the regular season with a new career-high 38 points through 72 regular-season AHL games. Throughout the season, he also recorded a six-game point streak between February 3 and February 12, and registered his first three-assist game on November 18. Following his second career-best season, Stephenson signed a two-year, $1.3 million contract to remain with the Capitals organization on June 29, 2017.

Although Stephenson was originally returned to the Hershey Bears to begin the 2017–18 season, he was recalled on October 24, 2017, after playing six games. Through those six games, Stephenson led the team with five goals and tied for the team lead with six points. As a result of numerous injuries to the Capitals lineup, Stephenson played on their top line during a 6–2 loss to the Vancouver Canucks on October 26. During the game, he recorded his first career NHL goal against goaltender Anders Nilsson. As a result of his performance, Stephenson was placed on a line with Lars Eller and Tom Wilson at the end of October which produced five goals and 13 points through six games. However, his production slowed down as the season continued and he snapped a 28-game goal drought with two goals in a 5–3 win over the Philadelphia Flyers. Throughout the season, Stephenson became a mainstay in the Capitals' bottom-six forward group and spent time on the penalty kill and in 3-on-3 overtime. He finished the season playing 87:20 on the penalty kill, the fifth-most amongst Capitals forwards. As the Capitals qualified for the 2018 Stanley Cup playoffs, he was expected to play a major role in their post-season run.

Stephenson made his NHL playoffs debut during game one against the Columbus Blue Jackets playing on the fourth line but was promoted to the second line mid-series. While playing alongside Nicklas Bäckström, he recorded four points including an assist on Bäckström's overtime winner in game five and a shorthanded goal in game six. Following injuries to the lineup during Round 2, Stephenson was promoted to first-line right wing with Evgeny Kuznetsov and Alexander Ovechkin. As a member of the top line, Stephenson helped the Capitals qualify for the Eastern Conference final for the first time in 20 years. The Capitals met the Tampa Bay Lightning in the Conference Final, where Stephenson assisted on a goal that helped Washington tie the series. They beat the Lightning in seven games and met the Vegas Golden Knights in the Stanley Cup Final. During the playoffs, Stephenson became the first rookie in franchise history to score a playoff short-handed goal, and the first to record two straight multi-point games. On June 7, 2018, Stephenson and the Capitals defeated the Golden Knights 4–3 to clinch their first Stanley Cup in franchise history. Afterward, Stephenson stated that he would spend his day with the Stanley Cup in Humboldt, Saskatchewan, in honour of the Humboldt Broncos bus crash victims. On August 24, Stephenson took the Stanley Cup to the highway intersection where the crash happened and met privately with some of the survivors.

Following their Stanley Cup run, Stephenson registered five goals and six assists during the 64 games he played in 2018–19. Due to the suspensions of Tom Wilson and Evgeny Kuznetsov, Stephenson earned a spot on the top lines to begin the 2018–19 season. Throughout the season, head coach Todd Reirden consistently shuffled the fourth line and Stephenson often played alongside new teammates. Despite a decline in production, he finished the regular season without taking a single penalty. His 64 games without a penalty surpassed the Capitals previous franchise record set by Keith Aucoin in the 2011–12 season. Stephenson attributed his decline in production to his mental health. After a disappointing regular season, he competed in six of the Capitals' seven playoff games against the Carolina Hurricanes. He was a healthy scratch for game four before being reinserted into the lineup prior to game five. On his 25th birthday, Stephenson committed his first penalty in over a year by tripping Hurricanes player Saku Mäenalanen in game six. After being eliminated from the playoffs, he signed a one-year, $1.05M contract extension to remain with the Capitals.

==== Vegas Golden Knights (2019–2024) ====
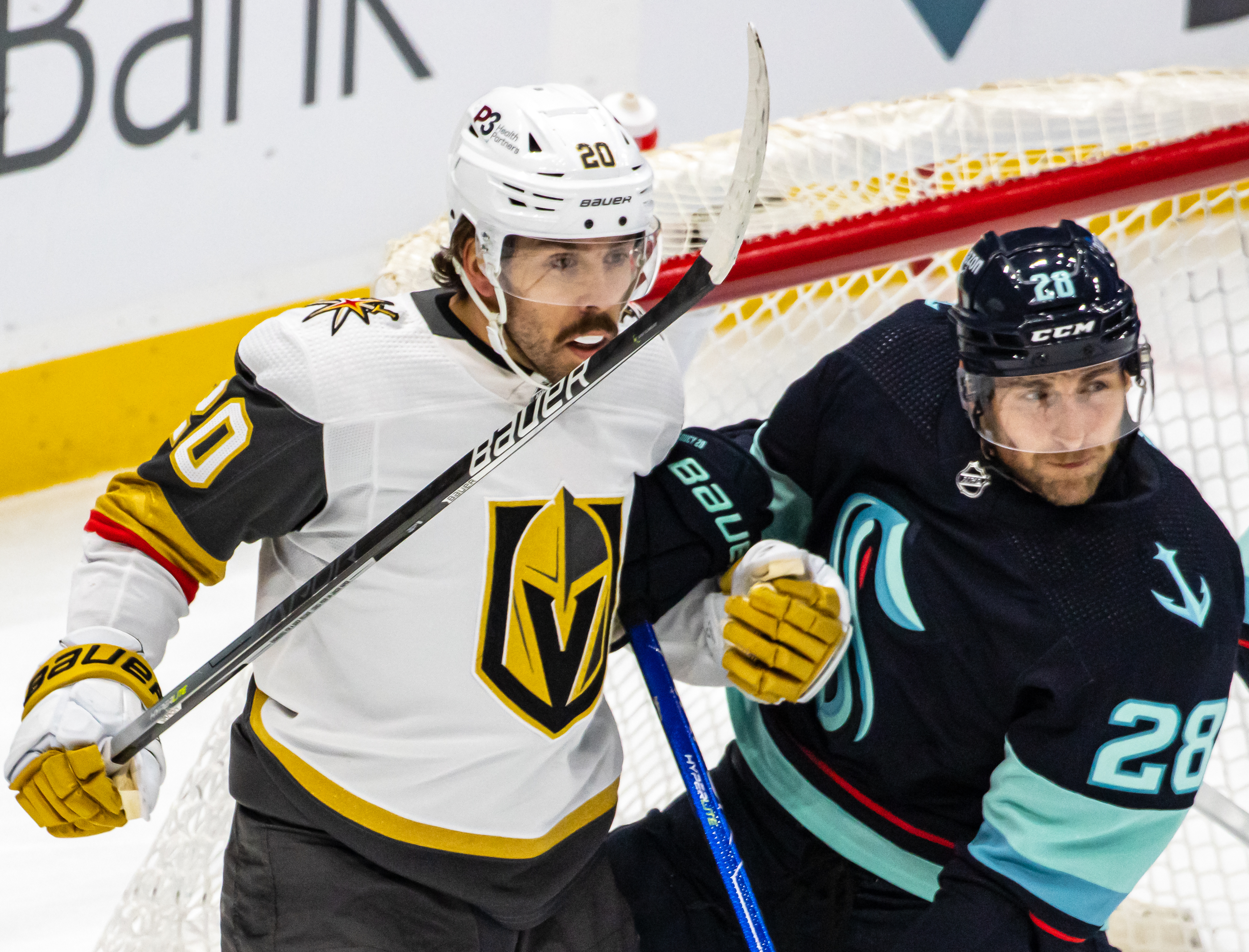
Stephenson (left) with the Golden Knights in 2023

On December 2, 2019, having contributed with just four points through 24 games, Stephenson was traded by the Capitals to the Vegas Golden Knights in exchange for a fifth-round pick in the 2021 NHL entry draft. Following the acquisition, the Golden Knights' general manager Kelly McCrimmon admitted that the team had its eyes on Stephenson a while. He made his debut the following day playing alongside Tomáš Nosek and Ryan Reaves, where he scored the opening goal in a 4–3 victory over the New Jersey Devils. Upon joining the Golden Knights, Stephenson broke out offensively and set new career-highs in goals, assists, and points.

Following his breakout season, Stephenson signed a four-year, $11 million contract extension with the Golden Knights on October 7, 2020. He was promoted to the first line with Mark Stone and Max Pacioretty, which outscored opponents 15–5 at five-on-five. On April 1, 2021, Stephenson was suspended for two games after he elbowed Kings defenseman Tobias Björnfot at 18:07 of the second period. Following his suspension, he matched his career-high from the 2019–20 season with 26 points in 41 games played. As the Golden Knights qualified for the 2021 Stanley Cup playoffs, Stephenson missed three games against the Montreal Canadiens with an undisclosed injury.

Upon completing another breakout season, Stephenson began the 2021–22 season without his usual linemates, who had both been injured early in the season. In spite of this, he led the Golden Knights in scoring with nine points through six games. Ultimately, Stephenson once again set new career-highs, posting 21 goals and 43 assists for a total of 64 points in 79 games.

After starting the 2022–23 season with 44 points through 51 games, Stephenson was named to his first career NHL All-Star Game, as an injury replacement for Matty Beniers. Stephenson returned to the Stanley Cup Final in 2023, now playing for the team he defeated when he was a member of the Capitals in 2018, and would win his second Stanley Cup with the Golden Knights. Stephenson became the third player of the expansion era to win a Cup with a team he had previously defeated for it, joining Scott Niedermayer (with New Jersey in 2003 and Anaheim in 2007) and Billy Carroll (with the New York Islanders in 1983 and Edmonton in 1985).

==== Seattle Kraken (2024–present) ====
Following the 2023–24 season, Stephenson signed as a free agent to a seven-year, $43.75 million contract with the Seattle Kraken on July 1, 2024.

== Career statistics ==
=== Regular season and playoffs ===
			Regular season					Playoffs
Season	Team	League	GP	G	A	Pts	PIM	GP	G	A	Pts	PIM
2008–09	Saskatoon Blazers	SMHL	9	2	1	3	2	—	—	—	—	—
2009–10	Saskatoon Contacts	SMHL	42	17	37	54	34	11	5	14	19	4
2010–11	Regina Pats	WHL	60	7	12	19	6	—	—	—	—	—
2011–12	Regina Pats	WHL	55	22	20	42	24	5	1	3	4	0
2012–13	Regina Pats	WHL	46	14	31	45	37	—	—	—	—	—
2013–14	Regina Pats	WHL	69	30	59	89	65	4	0	4	4	0
2013–14	Hershey Bears	AHL	2	1	0	1	0	—	—	—	—	—
2014–15	Hershey Bears	AHL	54	7	7	14	10	10	1	4	5	2
2015–16	Hershey Bears	AHL	46	7	21	28	26	17	1	5	6	2
2015–16	Washington Capitals	NHL	9	0	0	0	2	—	—	—	—	—
2016–17	Hershey Bears	AHL	72	10	28	38	42	9	3	2	5	6
2016–17	Washington Capitals	NHL	4	0	0	0	0	—	—	—	—	—
2017–18	Hershey Bears	AHL	6	5	1	6	2	—	—	—	—	—
2017–18	Washington Capitals	NHL	67	6	12	18	8	24	2	5	7	8
2018–19	Washington Capitals	NHL	64	5	6	11	0	6	0	0	0	2
2019–20	Washington Capitals	NHL	24	3	1	4	6	—	—	—	—	—
2019–20	Vegas Golden Knights	NHL	41	8	14	22	10	20	3	2	5	4
2020–21	Vegas Golden Knights	NHL	51	14	21	35	29	16	0	6	6	0
2021–22	Vegas Golden Knights	NHL	79	21	43	64	26	—	—	—	—	—
2022–23	Vegas Golden Knights	NHL	81	16	49	65	26	22	10	10	20	30
2023–24	Vegas Golden Knights	NHL	75	16	35	51	25	7	0	1	1	8
2024–25	Seattle Kraken	NHL	78	13	38	51	24	—	—	—	—	—
2025–26	Seattle Kraken	NHL	80	16	33	49	14	—	—	—	—	—
NHL totals			653	118	252	370	170	95	15	24	39	52

=== International ===
Year	Team	Event	Result	GP	G	A	Pts	PIM
2011	Canada Western	U17	6th	5	4	2	6	8
Junior totals				5	4	2	6	8

== Awards and honours ==
Award	Year
NHL
NHL All-Star Game	2023
Stanley Cup champion	2018, 2023
