= Outlook station (Saskatchewan) =

Railway station in Saskatchewan, Canada

Coordinates: 51°29′21.07″N 107°3′15.79″W

Outlook
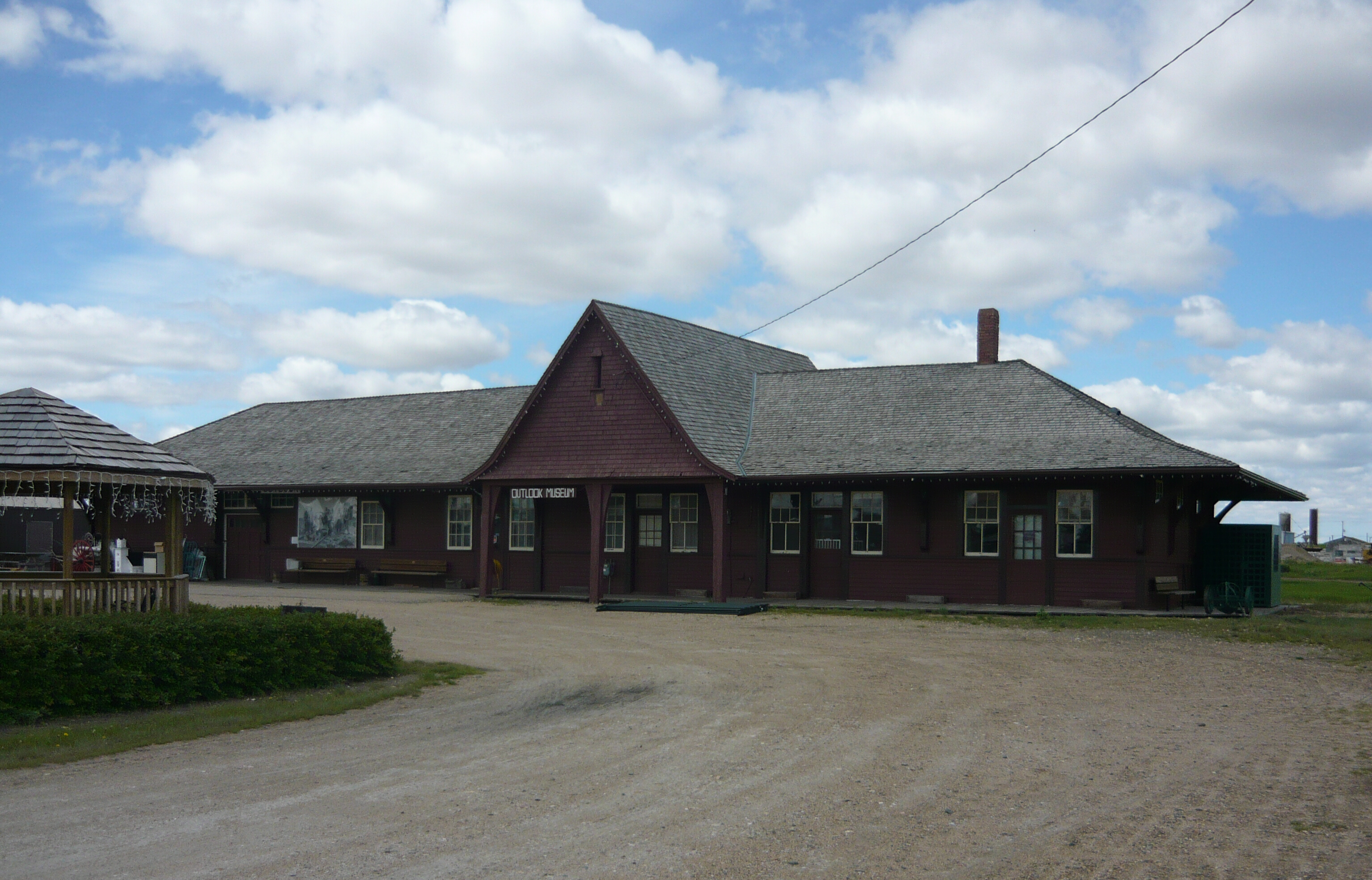
- Outlook station

General information
- Location: 100 Railway Avenue; Outlook, Saskatchewan

History
- Opened: 1909
- Closed: 1965

Former services
Preceding station	Canadian Pacific Railway	Following station
Betalock toward Macklin	Macklin – Moose Jaw	Broderick toward Moose Jaw
Location

The Outlook station is a former railway station in Outlook, Saskatchewan. It was built by the Canadian Pacific Railway (CPR) as part of the construction of the Moose Jaw-Edmonton branch line. The station served as a division point on the railway, for this reason the CPR built a station that is much larger than normal for a town the size of Outlook. Until the arrival of diesel engines the station also hosted a large yard with maintenance and service facilities. The single story station is of a CPR Standard Plan X-13 design. Due to the nearby Skytrail bridge Outlook became an important transit point. By the 1950s traffic at the station had dropped to local traffic with freight continuing into the 1970s. The building was designated a municipal heritage site in 2003. The line and Skytrail bridge were abandoned with the last train using the Skytrail bridge on March 16, 1987.

The station is now home to the Outlook & District Heritage Museum.
