= Bliss (spa) =

American chain of spas

Blissworld, LLC.
- Company type: Private
- Genre: Spa and Retail Product Company
- Founded: 1996; 30 years ago, in New York City, U.S.
- Founder: Marcia Kilgore
- Headquarters: New York City, United States
- Number of locations: 2
- Area served: New York City, Hong Kong
- Products: Bath, Body and Skincare
- Services: Facial, Massage, Body treatment, Manicure, Pedicure and Waxing
- Parent: AS Beauty Group
- Website: blissworld.com

Blissworld, LLC., commonly referred to as Bliss, is a multi-channel spa and retail product company headquartered in New York City. The company retails its own line of bath, body and skincare products through its Bliss website, Bliss spa stores and at retailers including Walgreens, Amazon, Ulta, and Walmart.

== History ==
Bliss spa was founded in 1996 by Marcia Kilgore, a Saskatchewan native who moved to Manhattan in 1987 to attend Columbia University. During college, she became a personal trainer to make money. Soon after she decided to go to esthetician school, largely because she had personally suffered from acne since her preteen years. She began giving facials to her friends out of her East Village apartment. She opened her first single-room office in New York’s Soho district in 1991, followed by the opening of a three-room mini-spa called Let’s Face It! in June 1993. To accommodate increasing demand, Kilgore opened the first Bliss Spa in SoHo in July 1996.

In March 1999, the luxury products group, LVMH (Moët Hennessy Louis Vuitton), acquired a majority stake in Bliss spa for a reported $30 million. It was LVMH’s first North American acquisition, and a break with their previous strategy of pursuing European prestige brands. In December 1999, LVMH opened a second location, Bliss 57 on East 57th Street.

Two years later, in November 2001, Bliss opened its first international spa, Bliss London. The next year the company launched its first QuickBliss spa service station at Harvey Nichols Knightsbridge in London, offering an abbreviated menu of fast facials, waxing and nail services.

In January 2004, Starwood acquired Bliss spa from LVMH for $25 million. As part of the acquisition, Starwood launched Bliss Spas in several of its W Hotels in an effort to move its W hotel brand into the resort business. The first to be opened, that same year, was Bliss 49 in the W New York Union Square. During the next two years spas were opened in the company's hotels in San Francisco, Chicago, Los Angeles, and Dallas.

In April 2006, JetBlue Airways partnered with Bliss spa, in an effort to fill seats in competitive transcontinental markets. Bliss amenity kits were distributed to passengers on overnight flights between Western states and the East Coast for a one-year period. The Bliss World brand began in 2006 with products in-store at Target, Walmart, CVS, Walgreens and a retail site. Bliss continued to expand within the hotel chain, opening in Atlanta, Scottsdale and Hong Kong in 2008, a second Atlanta location, Doha, Hoboken, and Ft. Lauderdale in 2009, and St. Petersburg in 2011. In January 2010, Steiner Leisure Limited completed its $100 million acquisition of Bliss from Starwood. Bliss became a B-certified corporation in May 2021. This made Bliss World the first skincare brand sold on a mass production scale to receive a B Corp Certification. In 2023 AS Beauty Group acquired Bliss.

== Brand ==
Bliss spa is often credited for starting the mid 1990s spa boom. Its products and services are market with humorous names and slogans, and by a playful "Blissgirl" character illustration which appears on products, catalogs and the company website. She is normally seen dressed in a signature white towel and Bliss’ Softening Socks and Glamour Gloves.

Blissgirl

Advertised as "the young, modern antithesis to stuffy, intimidating spas", the spas include rhythm & blues music, a brownie buffet, and "movie-while-you-manicure" nail stations. The spa has attracted celebrity clientele including Oprah Winfrey, Julia Roberts, Uma Thurman, Jennifer Lopez and Madonna.

== Products ==
Bliss began to sell a line of beauty and health products in 2006, many of which are meant to allow customers to recreate the spa experience at home. The products include hair care, body care and skincare.

== Awards ==
- Spa Finder Best Brand 2007
- Conde Nast Traveler Hot List 2006 - Bliss San Francisco and Hot List 2007 - Bliss Los Angeles
- Allure Best Body Scrub - Super Minty Soap n’ Scrub and Best Hotel Day Spa - Bliss 49
- InStyle Magazine Best Beauty Buy 2007 - Baggage Handler
- 2023 Alure Best of Beauty Awards - Best Steals: Body, Cloud 9 Body Lotion
- 2023 Oprah Daily Editor's Choice Award - Best Cellulite Cream, Fabgirl Firm Skin Tightening Body Cream.
- 2023 Women's Health - At-Home Waxing Kit choice, Poetic Wax Kit.
