= Bob Stephenson (ice hockey) =

Canadian ice hockey player (born 1954)

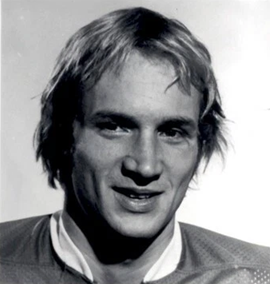
- Stephenson in 1978 photo
- Born: February 1, 1954 (age 72) Saskatoon, Saskatchewan, Canada
- Height: 6 ft 1 in (185 cm)
- Weight: 187 lb (85 kg; 13 st 5 lb)
- Position: Right wing
- Shot: Right
- Played for: Birmingham Bulls; Hartford Whalers; Toronto Maple Leafs
- NHL draft: Undrafted
- Playing career: 1977–1981

Bob Stephenson (born February 1, 1954) is a Canadian politician and former professional ice hockey right winger.

== Early life ==
Stephenson was born in Saskatoon, Saskatchewan. He was a member of the St. Francis Xavier X-Men at St. Francis Xavier University before turning professional.

== Career ==
Stephenson played in both the National Hockey League and World Hockey Association between 1977 and 1980. He served as the mayor of Outlook, Saskatchewan, from 1998 to 2016.

== Personal life ==
Stephenson is the father of Shay Stephenson and Logan Stephenson and the first cousin once removed of Chandler Stephenson as Stephenson and Chandler's father Curt Stephenson are first cousins.

== Career statistics ==
=== Regular season and playoffs ===
			Regular season					Playoffs
Season	Team	League	GP	G	A	Pts	PIM	GP	G	A	Pts	PIM
1974–75	St. Francis Xavier University	CIAU	18	21	24	45	67	—	—	—	—	—
1975–76	St. Francis Xavier University	CIAU	16	22	16	38	38	—	—	—	—	—
1976–77	St. Francis Xavier University	CIAU	19	20	23	43	39	—	—	—	—	—
1977–78	Birmingham Bulls	WHA	39	7	6	13	33	—	—	—	—	—
1977–78	Hampton Gulls	AHL	1	0	0	0	0	—	—	—	—	—
1977–78	Flint Generals	IHL	6	2	5	7	7	—	—	—	—	—
1977–78	Tulsa Oilers	CHL	9	1	1	2	7	—	—	—	—	—
1978–79	Birmingham Bulls	WHA	78	23	24	47	72	—	—	—	—	—
1979–80	Hartford Whalers	NHL	4	0	1	1	0	—	—	—	—	—
1979–80	Springfield Indians	AHL	28	10	18	28	40	—	—	—	—	—
1979–80	Toronto Maple Leafs	NHL	14	2	2	4	4	—	—	—	—	—
1979–80	New Brunswick Hawks	AHL	10	6	2	8	4	12	2	1	3	0
1980–81	Springfield Indians	AHL	27	5	2	7	43	—	—	—	—	—
WHA totals			117	30	30	60	105	—	—	—	—	—
NHL totals			18	2	3	5	4	—	—	—	—	—
