= Beauty Pie =

Direct-to-consumer beauty retailer

- Type: Private
- Industry: Beauty
- Founded: 2016
- Founder: Marcia Kilgore
- Headquarters: United Kingdom
- Number of employees: 130 (2026)
- Website: www.beautypie.com

Beauty Pie is a British membership-based beauty buying club founded by Marcia Kilgore in 2016. The company sells cosmetics, skincare and other beauty products sourced from manufacturers.

== History ==
Beauty Pie was founded by Marcia Kilgore in 2016 and launched in the United Kingdom. Kilgore developed the idea for Beauty Pie after visiting cosmetics manufacturers in Italy and noticing how much higher retail prices were than production costs.

By June 2017, Beauty Pie had signed up more than 10,000 members. In 2020, the company expanded its product range to include supplements. In 2021, it raised $100 million in funding.

== Business model ==
Beauty Pie operates as a membership-based beauty buying club. Its products are sourced from manufacturers and sold under the company's own label. Members pay a subscription fee to purchase products at discounted prices. Non-members can also buy the products, but at higher prices.

The company reduces traditional retail markups by cutting out intermediaries. When Beauty Pie launched, it disclosed the costs of manufacturing, packaging, storing and testing its products.

Beauty Pie's original membership model included monthly spending limits. These limits were based on the products' estimated retail prices, not the discounted prices paid by members. In 2020, some industry observers argued that Beauty Pie memberships only made financial sense for customers spending substantial amounts, while others considered the different membership tiers potentially confusing.

In 2021, Beauty Pie launched a new membership option with an annual spending allowance instead of monthly spending limits. In 2022, The Observer raised questions about how Beauty Pie's membership model would fare during the cost-of-living crisis, as consumers reduced spending on subscriptions.
