= Don Saxton =

Canadian volleyball player (born 1956)

Personal information
- Born: 7 December 1956 (age 68); Outlook, Saskatchewan, Canada

Sport
- Sport: Volleyball

Don Saxton (born 7 December 1956) is a Canadian former volleyball player. He competed in the men's tournament at the 1984 Summer Olympics.
