= Shay Stephenson =

Canadian ice hockey player (born 1983)

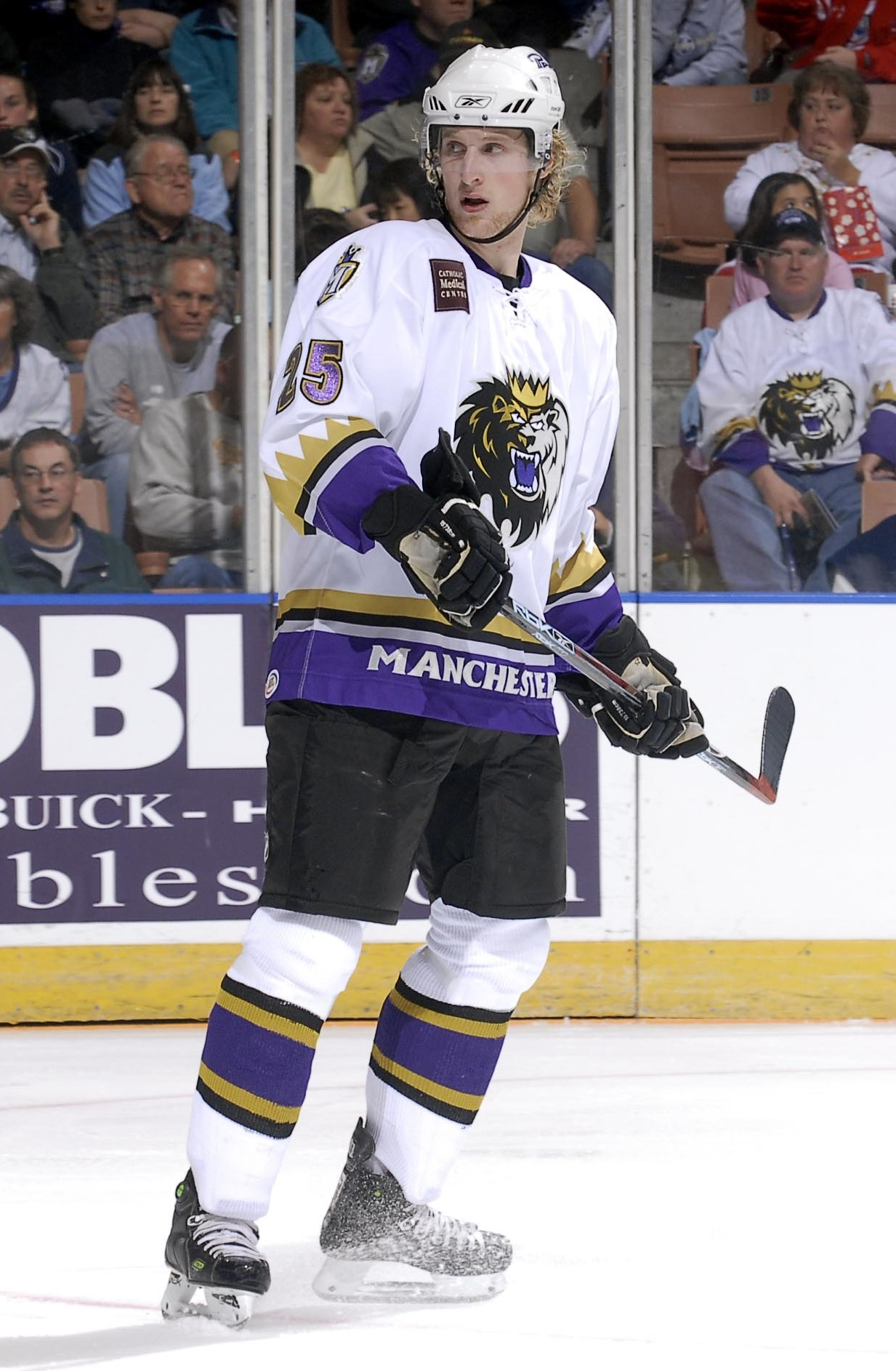
- Stephenson with the Manchester Monarchs in 2006
- Born: September 13, 1983 (age 41); Outlook, Saskatchewan, Canada
- Height: 6 ft 4 in (193 cm)
- Weight: 200 lb (91 kg; 14 st 4 lb)
- Position: Left wing
- Shot: Left
- Played for: Los Angeles Kings; Milano Vipers; Krefeld Pinguine; Vålerenga Ishockey; Karlskrona HK; Sparta Warriors
- NHL draft: 278th overall, 2001; Edmonton Oilers; 198th overall, 2003; Carolina Hurricanes
- Playing career: 2004–2022

Shay Stephenson (born September 13, 1983) is a Canadian former professional hockey player. He played in 2 games in the National Hockey League with the Los Angeles Kings during the 2006–07 season. The rest of his career, which lasted from 2004 to 2022, was spent in European leagues and then in senior leagues in Canada. He is the son of Bob Stephenson and the older brother of Logan Stephenson. He is also second cousin to Chandler Stephenson as Shay's father and Chandler's father are first cousins.

== Career statistics ==
=== Regular season and playoffs ===
| | | | Regular season | | | | | Playoffs |
| Season | Team | League | GP | G | A | Pts | PIM | GP | G | A | Pts | PIM |
|---|---|---|---|---|---|---|---|---|---|---|---|---|
| 1999–00 | Notre Dame Hounds AAA | SMHL | 42 | 23 | 7 | 30 | 46 | — | — | — | — | — |
| 2000–01 | Red Deer Rebels | WHL | 44 | 1 | 4 | 5 | 30 | 22 | 0 | 0 | 0 | 15 |
| 2001–02 | Red Deer Rebels | WHL | 59 | 9 | 10 | 19 | 55 | 23 | 0 | 3 | 3 | 14 |
| 2002–03 | Red Deer Rebels | WHL | 67 | 17 | 15 | 32 | 84 | 23 | 6 | 5 | 11 | 33 |
| 2003–04 | Red Deer Rebels | WHL | 60 | 11 | 19 | 30 | 34 | 19 | 5 | 7 | 12 | 16 |
| 2004–05 | IF Sundsvall Hockey | SWE-2 | 44 | 13 | 13 | 26 | 104 | — | — | — | — | — |
| 2005–06 | Manchester Monarchs | AHL | 6 | 0 | 0 | 0 | 4 | — | — | — | — | — |
| 2005–06 | Reading Royals | ECHL | 62 | 19 | 22 | 41 | 42 | 4 | 0 | 2 | 2 | 8 |
| 2006–07 | Los Angeles Kings | NHL | 2 | 0 | 0 | 0 | 0 | — | — | — | — | — |
| 2006–07 | Manchester Monarchs | AHL | 55 | 11 | 10 | 21 | 67 | 5 | 1 | 0 | 1 | 4 |
| 2007–08 | Milano Vipers | ITA | 34 | 25 | 20 | 45 | 58 | — | — | — | — | — |
| 2008–09 | Krefeld Pinguine | DEL | 55 | 10 | 10 | 20 | 76 | 7 | 0 | 0 | 0 | 6 |
| 2009–10 | Las Vegas Wranglers | ECHL | 36 | 6 | 13 | 19 | 76 | — | — | — | — | — |
| 2009–10 | Vålerenga Ishockey | NOR | 7 | 4 | 2 | 6 | 8 | 16 | 4 | 8 | 12 | 26 |
| 2011–12 | Vålerenga Ishockey | NOR | 44 | 28 | 42 | 70 | 163 | 8 | 3 | 2 | 5 | 16 |
| 2012–13 | Karlskrona HK | SWE-2 | 3 | 0 | 0 | 0 | 6 | — | — | — | — | — |
| 2012–13 | Sparta Warriors | NOR | 5 | 5 | 3 | 8 | 14 | 8 | 4 | 0 | 4 | 12 |
| 2013–14 | Sparta Warriors | NOR | 28 | 9 | 8 | 17 | 44 | — | — | — | — | — |
| 2014–15 | Outlook Ice Hawks | SVHL | 17 | 10 | 22 | 32 | 16 | 3 | 1 | 1 | 2 | 0 |
| 2015–16 | Outlook Ice Hawks | SVHL | 18 | 20 | 27 | 47 | 32 | 2 | 1 | 0 | 1 | 2 |
| 2016–17 | Outlook Ice Hawks | SVHL | 18 | 21 | 15 | 36 | 8 | 6 | 5 | 8 | 13 | 11 |
| 2017–18 | Outlook Ice Hawks | SVHL | 17 | 18 | 19 | 37 | 12 | — | — | — | — | — |
| 2018–19 | Outlook Ice Hawks | SVHL | 15 | 18 | 11 | 29 | 16 | 6 | 1 | 3 | 4 | 6 |
| 2020–21 | Outlook Ice Hawks | SVHL | 2 | 0 | 1 | 1 | 2 | — | — | — | — | — |
| 2021–22 | Outlook Ice Hawks | SVHL | 1 | 0 | 1 | 1 | 2 | 1 | 1 | 0 | 1 | 0 |
| AHL totals | | | 61 | 11 | 10 | 21 | 71 | 5 | 1 | 0 | 1 | 4 |
| ECHL totals | | | 98 | 25 | 35 | 60 | 118 | 4 | 0 | 2 | 2 | 8 |
| NHL totals | | | 2 | 0 | 0 | 0 | 0 | — | — | — | — | — |

== Transactions ==
- June 21, 2001 - Drafted by the Edmonton Oilers in the 9th round, 278th overall.
- June 22, 2003 - Re-entered the NHL draft, drafted by the Carolina Hurricanes in the 7th round, 198th overall.
- August 17, 2005 - Signed by the Los Angeles Kings as a free agent.
- January 25, 2010 - Moved to Norway to play for Vålerenga Ishockey.
