= Logan Stephenson =

Canadian ice hockey player

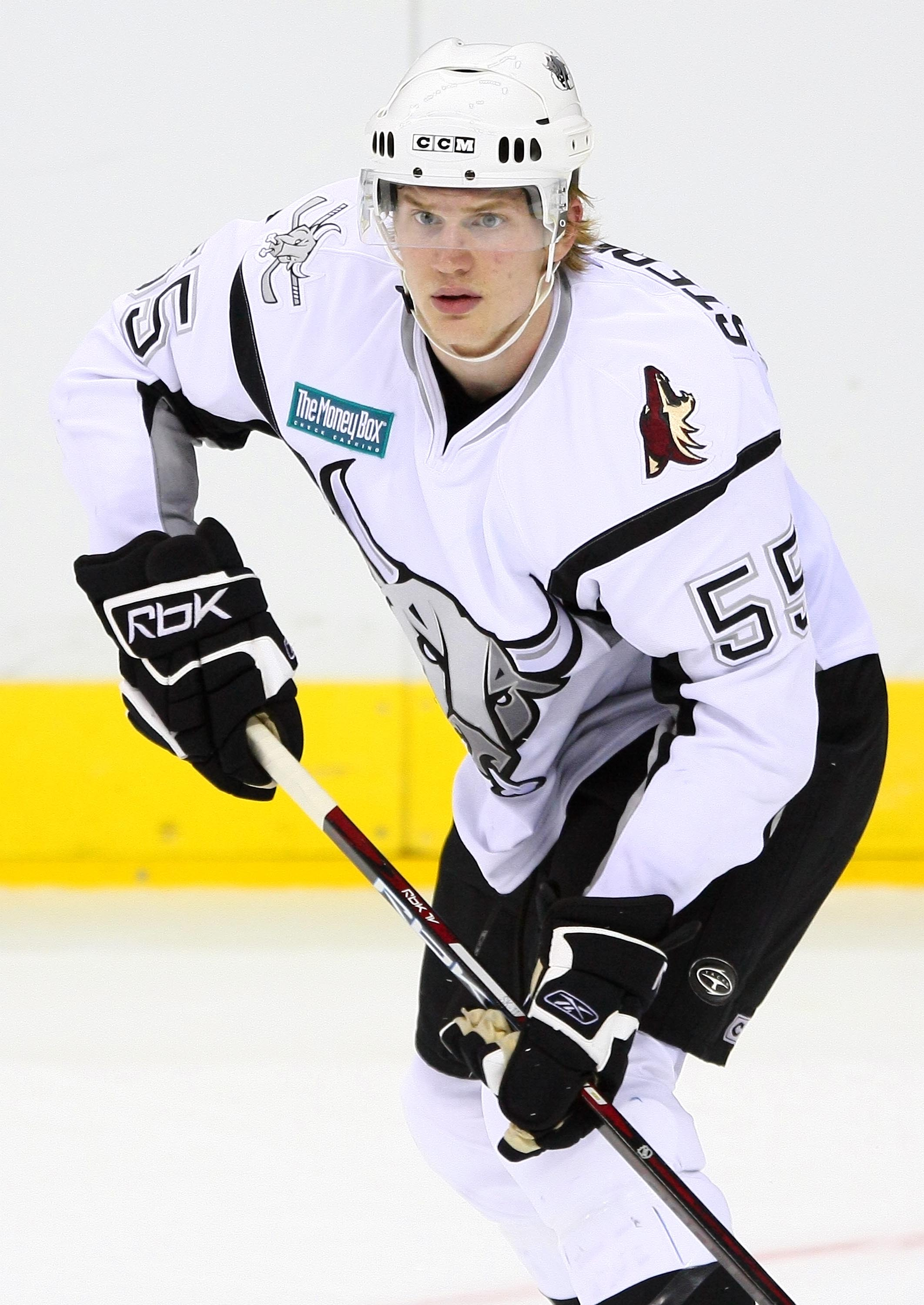
- Stephenson with the San Antonio Rampage in 2007
- Born: February 19, 1986 (age 40) Outlook, Saskatchewan, Canada
- Height: 6 ft 3 in (191 cm)
- Weight: 210 lb (95 kg; 15 st 0 lb)
- Position: Defence
- Shoots: Left
- ALH team Former teams: Tohoku Free Blades; San Antonio Rampage; Iowa Chops; Rockford IceHogs; Adirondack Phantoms; Vålerenga; Karlskrona HK; Sparta Warriors
- NHL draft: 35th overall, 2004; Phoenix Coyotes
- Playing career: 2006–present

Logan Stephenson (born February 19, 1986) is a Canadian professional ice hockey defenceman who currently plays in Japan for the Tohoku Free Blades of the Asian League. He was originally drafted 35th overall in the 2004 NHL entry draft by the Phoenix Coyotes. He is the son of Bob Stephenson and the younger brother of Shay Stephenson, who plays for the Norwegian hockeyteam Sparta Warriors. Stephenson's second cousin, Chandler Stephenson, won the Stanley Cup in 2018 with the Washington Capitals.

On July 22, 2015, Stephenson signed a one-year extension to remain in Japan after a successful first season with the Free Blades., and with his accomplishment over the years, was appointed as their Player Coach in July 2018.

== Career statistics ==
			Regular season					Playoffs
Season	Team	League	GP	G	A	Pts	PIM	GP	G	A	Pts	PIM
2001–02	Notre Dame Hounds AAA	SMHL	37	4	2	6	74	3	1	1	2	11
2001–02	Tri–City Americans	WHL	—	—	—	—	—	3	0	0	0	0
2002–03	Tri–City Americans	WHL	50	0	6	6	121	—	—	—	—	—
2003–04	Tri–City Americans	WHL	69	3	8	11	112	11	1	1	2	10
2004–05	Tri–City Americans	WHL	59	6	9	15	86	5	0	0	0	2
2005–06	Tri–City Americans	WHL	71	10	43	53	162	5	1	0	1	18
2006–07	San Antonio Rampage	AHL	73	3	5	8	90	—	—	—	—	—
2007–08	San Antonio Rampage	AHL	74	1	7	8	94	7	0	1	1	6
2008–09	San Antonio Rampage	AHL	19	1	1	2	40	—	—	—	—	—
2008–09	Iowa Chops	AHL	25	0	2	2	21	—	—	—	—	—
2008–09	Rockford IceHogs	AHL	16	1	2	3	31	4	0	0	0	14
2009–10	Adirondack Phantoms	AHL	62	1	7	8	140	—	—	—	—	—
2010–11	Adirondack Phantoms	AHL	43	2	3	5	46	—	—	—	—	—
2011–12	Vålerenga Ishockey	NOR	28	8	15	23	123	13	0	7	7	42
2012–13	Karlskrona HK	Allsv	21	0	1	1	67	—	—	—	—	—
2012–13	Sparta Warriors	NOR	14	4	10	14	60	6	2	2	4	2
2013–14	Sparta Warriors	NOR	44	7	16	23	128	1	0	0	0	8
2014–15	Tohoku Free Blades	ALH	43	5	7	12	120	7	3	4	7	22
2015–16	Tohoku Free Blades	ALH	48	17	18	35	167	5	2	2	4	4
2016–17	Tohoku Free Blades	ALH	43	7	28	35	142	5	0	0	0	4
2017–18	Tohoku Free Blades	ALH	22	3	11	14	48	4	1	1	2	2
2018–19	Tohoku Free Blades	ALH	33	4	16	20	101	—	—	—	—	—
2019–20	CSM Corona Brașov	EL	21	5	12	17	67	—	—	—	—	—
2019–20	CSM Corona Brașov	ROU	10	2	2	4	37	—	—	—	—	—
2019–20	Outlook Ice Hawks	SVHL	4	1	4	5	6	—	—	—	—	—
2019–20	HKm Zvolen	SVK	18	0	0	0	38	—	—	—	—	—
2020–21	Outlook Ice Hawks	SVHL	1	0	0	0	0	—	—	—	—	—
2021–22	Outlook Ice Hawks	SVHL	15	4	26	30	62	8	4	6	10	18
AHL totals			312	9	27	36	462	11	0	1	1	20
ALH totals			189	36	80	116	628	21	6	7	13	32

== Awards and honours ==
Award	Year
WHL
West Second All-Star Team	2006
