= Outlook, Saskatchewan =

Town in Saskatchewan, Canada

Town of Outlook
- Town
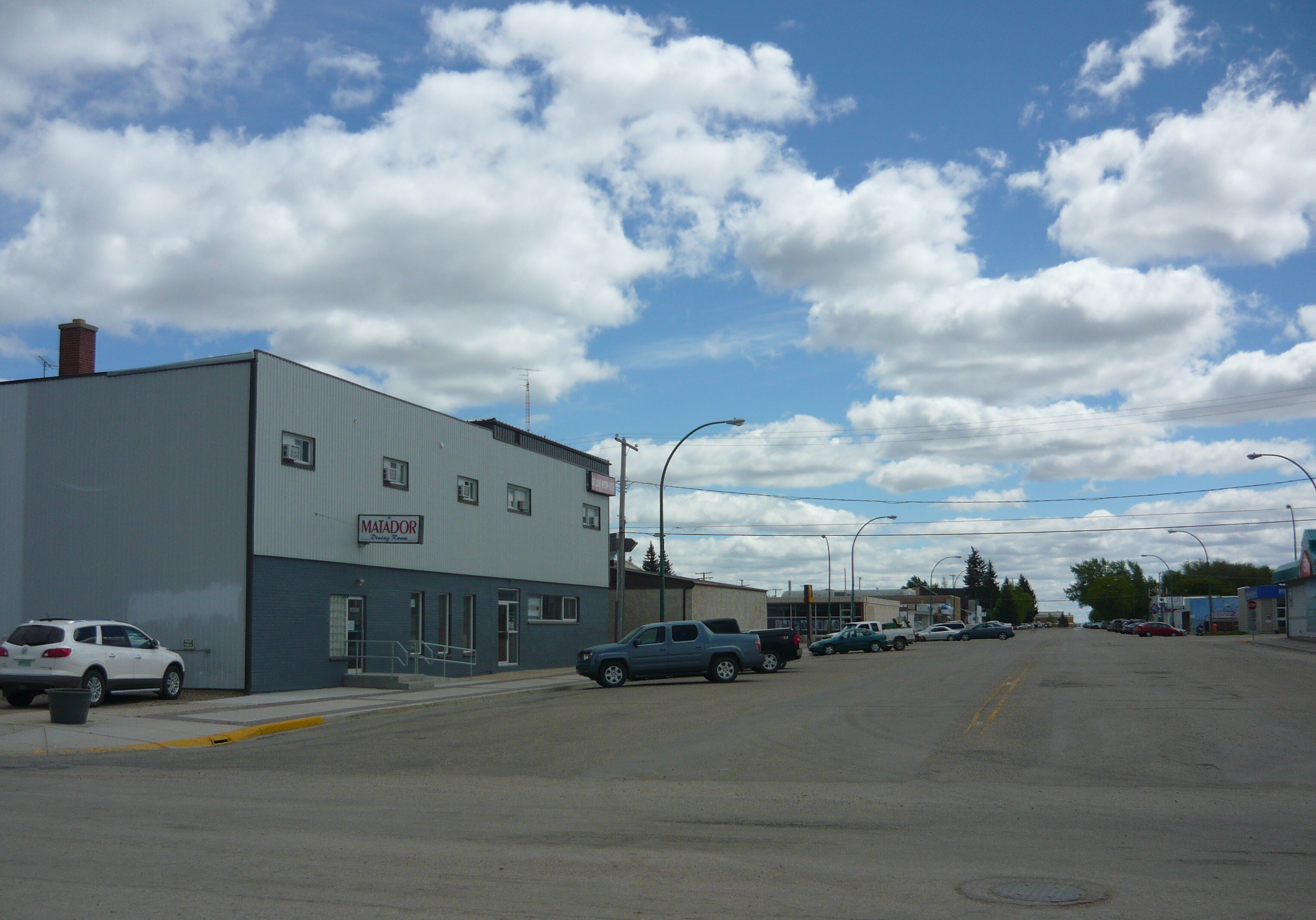
- Business District; Franklin Street
- Motto: "Home of Canada's Longest Pedestrian Bridge" "Irrigation Capital of Saskatchewan"
- Location of Outlook in Saskatchewan Town of Outlook (Canada)
- Coordinates: 51°30′N 107°03′W
- Country: Canada
- Province: Saskatchewan
- Census division: 11
- Rural municipality: Rudy No. 284
- Founded: 1908
- Incorporated (Village): 1908
- Incorporated (Town): 1909

Government
  - Governing body: Outlook Town Council
  - Mayor: Ryan Husband
  - Administrator: Kevin Trew
  - MP: Fraser Tolmie (CPC) – Moose Jaw—Lake Centre—Lanigan
  - MLA: Barret Kropf (SKP) – Dakota-Arm River

Area
  - Land: 7.83 km^{2} (3.02 sq mi)

Population (2016)
  - Total: 2,279
  - Density: 291/km^{2} (750/sq mi)
- Time zone: CST
- Postal code: S0L 2N0
- Area code: 306
- Highways: Highway 15
- Railways: Canadian Pacific Railway-(abandoned)
- Website: townofoutlook.ca

Outlook is a town in west central Saskatchewan, Canada, about 80 kilometres (50 mi) south-southwest of Saskatoon. It is located along the South Saskatchewan River, downstream from Gardiner Dam and the Coteau Creek Hydroelectric Station.

== History ==
Settlement began in the early 1900s with farmers and immigrants moving into the area looking for farmland. Outlook officially started as a settlement on August 26, 1908 when the Canadian Pacific Railway (CPR) commenced the auction of lots.

On November 23, 1908, the citizens of Outlook welcomed the first train which arrived from Moose Jaw. Within the month the CPR was running a tri-weekly train service carrying huge piles of lumber, however the supply of workers and materials was far outweighed by the demand for more buildings. The Outlook CPR Station building was built in 1909 and a year later, on November 1, 1910, Outlook was officially declared a town. In 1912 the Skytrail bridge crossing the South Saskatchewan River was finished, allowing both passenger and commercial traffic to cross the river in the area for the first time without using the ferry.

In 1910, a fire broke out in the hardware store in town, spreading rapidly and eventually grew to the size of a city block.

== Demographics ==
In the 2021 Census of Population conducted by Statistics Canada, Outlook had a population of 2,336 living in 1,001 of its 1,055 total private dwellings, a change of 2.5% from its 2016 population of 2,279. With a land area of 8.34 km^{2} (3.22 sq mi), it had a population density of 280.1/km^{2} (725.4/sq mi) in 2021.

Canada census – Outlook community profile

	2021	2011
Population	2,336 (+2.5% from 2016)	2,204 (13.7% from 2006)
Land area	8.34 km^{2} (3.22 sq mi)	7.83 km^{2} (3.02 sq mi)
Population density	280/km^{2} (730/sq mi)	281.3/km^{2} (729/sq mi)
Median age	44 (M: 41.2, F: 47.2)
Private dwellings	1,005 (total)	1046 (total)
Median household income

References: 2021 2011

== Arts and culture ==
Outlook's arts program includes the Equinox Theatre, a community theatre group that puts on one to two productions a year. They have put on such productions such as Anne of Green Gables and The Little Mermaid. In the past, the group would work in conjunction with the LCBI theatre group.

The Outlook and District Community Arts Council opened an art gallery in the Town Office Building.

== Attractions ==
- Outlook & District Regional Park (51.4834°N 107.0673°W) is a 100-acre park situated along the South Saskatchewan River adjacent to the town. It was founded in 1961 and has 50 electrified campsites, an outdoor heated junior size Olympic swimming pool and paddling pool for toddlers, hiking trails and the 9-hole Riverview Golf Course. The golf course was built in 1972 and has grass greens, is a par 36, and a total of 3,118 yards.
- The Skytrail Bridge is an old railway bridge, converted for pedestrian use; it is 3,000 feet long and stands 156 ft above the South Saskatchewan River. The Skytrail bridge has been closed to the public since 2013 due to unsafe conditions.
- Outlook railway station building is home to the Outlook & District Heritage Museum The museum has over 2,500 artifacts from the Outlook area. Some of the highlights include:
  - a caboose
  - an arrowhead and stone tool collection
  - an old holding cell from the Broderick train station
  - an antique wood stove
  - a collection of over 400 salt & pepper shakers
  - antique hospital equipment donated by the Outlook Union Hospital
  - the original printing press from Outlook Printers
  - the proposed model plan of Gardiner Dam and Lake Diefenbaker
  - original artwork by artist Arthur Evoy who was born in Outlook
- The Canada Saskatchewan Irrigation Diversification Centre, a research facility located on the outskirts of town, tests different crops, diseases, chemicals under dryland and irrigation. The centre has many tours during the summer as well as a field day in July.
- Outlook is the closest major town to the Gardiner Dam and adjacent Danielson Provincial Park, both located approximately 30 km to the south.

== Climate ==
Outlook has a humid continental climate (Dfb). The highest temperature ever recorded in Outlook was 41.1 °C (106 °F) on June 16, 1933, and July 4, 1937. The coldest temperature ever recorded was −52.2 °C (−62 °F) on February 25, 1919.

Climate data for Outlook, 1981–2010 normals, extremes 1915–present
Month	Jan	Feb	Mar	Apr	May	Jun	Jul	Aug	Sep	Oct	Nov	Dec	Year
Record high °C (°F)	10.6 (51.1)	14.4 (57.9)	23.3 (73.9)	33.9 (93.0)	37.2 (99.0)	41.1 (106.0)	41.1 (106.0)	39.4 (102.9)	37.5 (99.5)	32.8 (91.0)	22.8 (73.0)	16.1 (61.0)	41.1 (106.0)
Mean daily maximum °C (°F)	−8.1 (17.4)	−5.3 (22.5)	1.5 (34.7)	11.7 (53.1)	18.4 (65.1)	22.5 (72.5)	25.6 (78.1)	25.0 (77.0)	18.9 (66.0)	11.0 (51.8)	0.4 (32.7)	−6.0 (21.2)	9.6 (49.3)
Daily mean °C (°F)	−13.1 (8.4)	−10.1 (13.8)	−3.4 (25.9)	5.3 (41.5)	11.5 (52.7)	16.1 (61.0)	18.9 (66.0)	18.0 (64.4)	12.3 (54.1)	5.1 (41.2)	−4.1 (24.6)	−10.7 (12.7)	3.8 (38.8)
Mean daily minimum °C (°F)	−18.0 (−0.4)	−14.8 (5.4)	−8.2 (17.2)	−1.1 (30.0)	4.7 (40.5)	9.8 (49.6)	12.1 (53.8)	10.9 (51.6)	5.6 (42.1)	−0.9 (30.4)	−8.5 (16.7)	−15.4 (4.3)	−2.0 (28.4)
Record low °C (°F)	−45.0 (−49.0)	−52.2 (−62.0)	−46.1 (−51.0)	−28.3 (−18.9)	−10.8 (12.6)	−6.1 (21.0)	0.0 (32.0)	−1.1 (30.0)	−12.2 (10.0)	−28.9 (−20.0)	−34.4 (−29.9)	−42.2 (−44.0)	−52.2 (−62.0)
Average precipitation mm (inches)	13.9 (0.55)	8.6 (0.34)	19.3 (0.76)	21.6 (0.85)	42.6 (1.68)	63.9 (2.52)	56.1 (2.21)	42.8 (1.69)	34.1 (1.34)	16.6 (0.65)	14.6 (0.57)	14.7 (0.58)	348.6 (13.72)
Average rainfall mm (inches)	0.3 (0.01)	0.3 (0.01)	5.9 (0.23)	16.1 (0.63)	39.0 (1.54)	63.9 (2.52)	56.1 (2.21)	42.8 (1.69)	32.8 (1.29)	12.6 (0.50)	3.1 (0.12)	0.3 (0.01)	273.0 (10.75)
Average snowfall cm (inches)	13.6 (5.4)	8.3 (3.3)	12.9 (5.1)	5.5 (2.2)	3.6 (1.4)	0.0 (0.0)	0.0 (0.0)	0.0 (0.0)	1.3 (0.5)	3.8 (1.5)	11.6 (4.6)	14.7 (5.8)	75.3 (29.6)
Mean monthly sunshine hours	93.5	122.8	157.7	213.2	266.3	283.6	319.6	288.2	186.5	156.9	91.4	73.9	2,253.6
Percentage possible sunshine	35.9	43.7	42.9	51.4	55.1	57.1	64.0	63.7	49.0	47.3	34.1	30.0	47.9
Source: Environment Canada

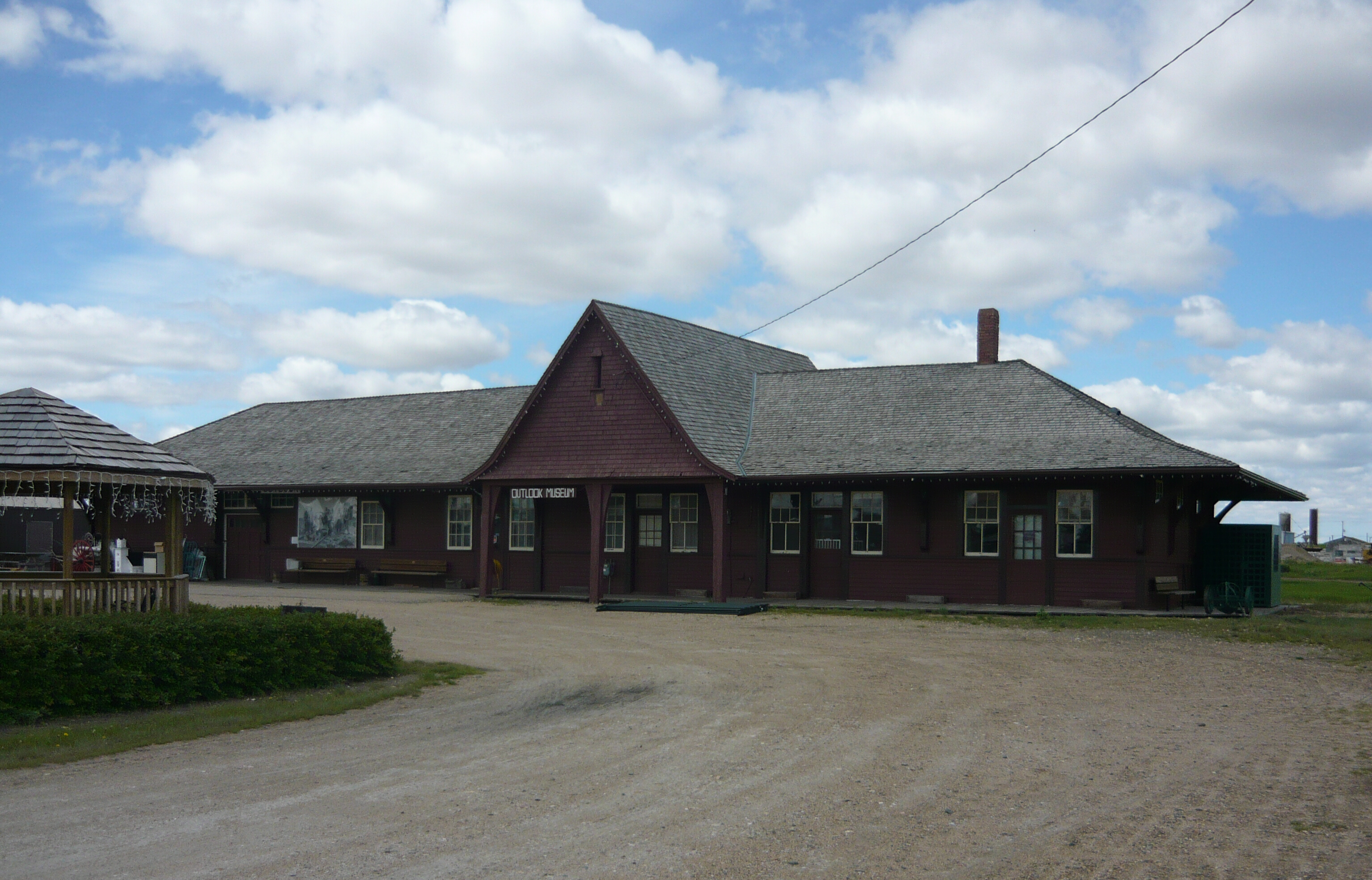
Former train station Outlook and District Heritage Museum

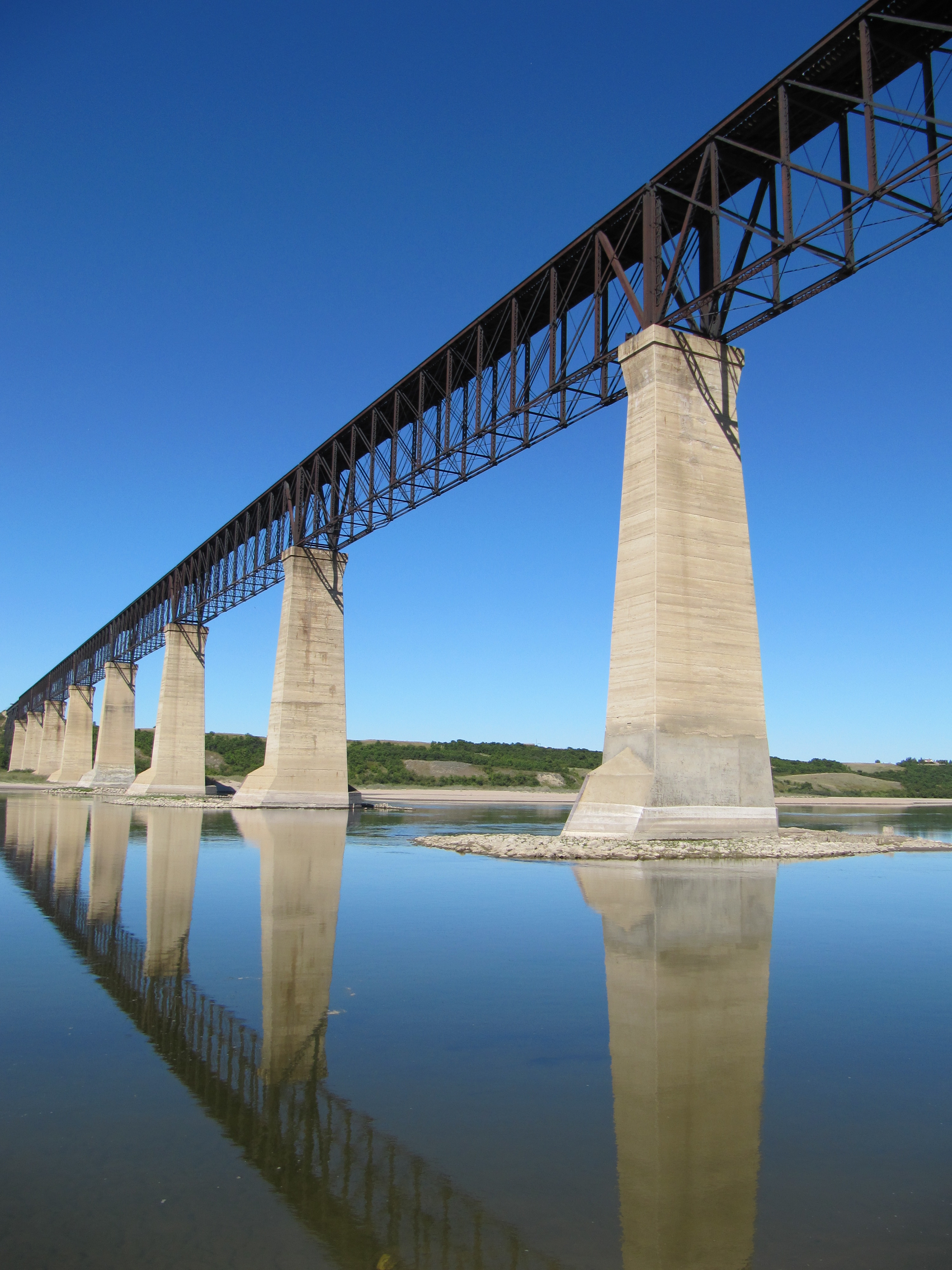
Former railroad bridge Skytrail Bridge

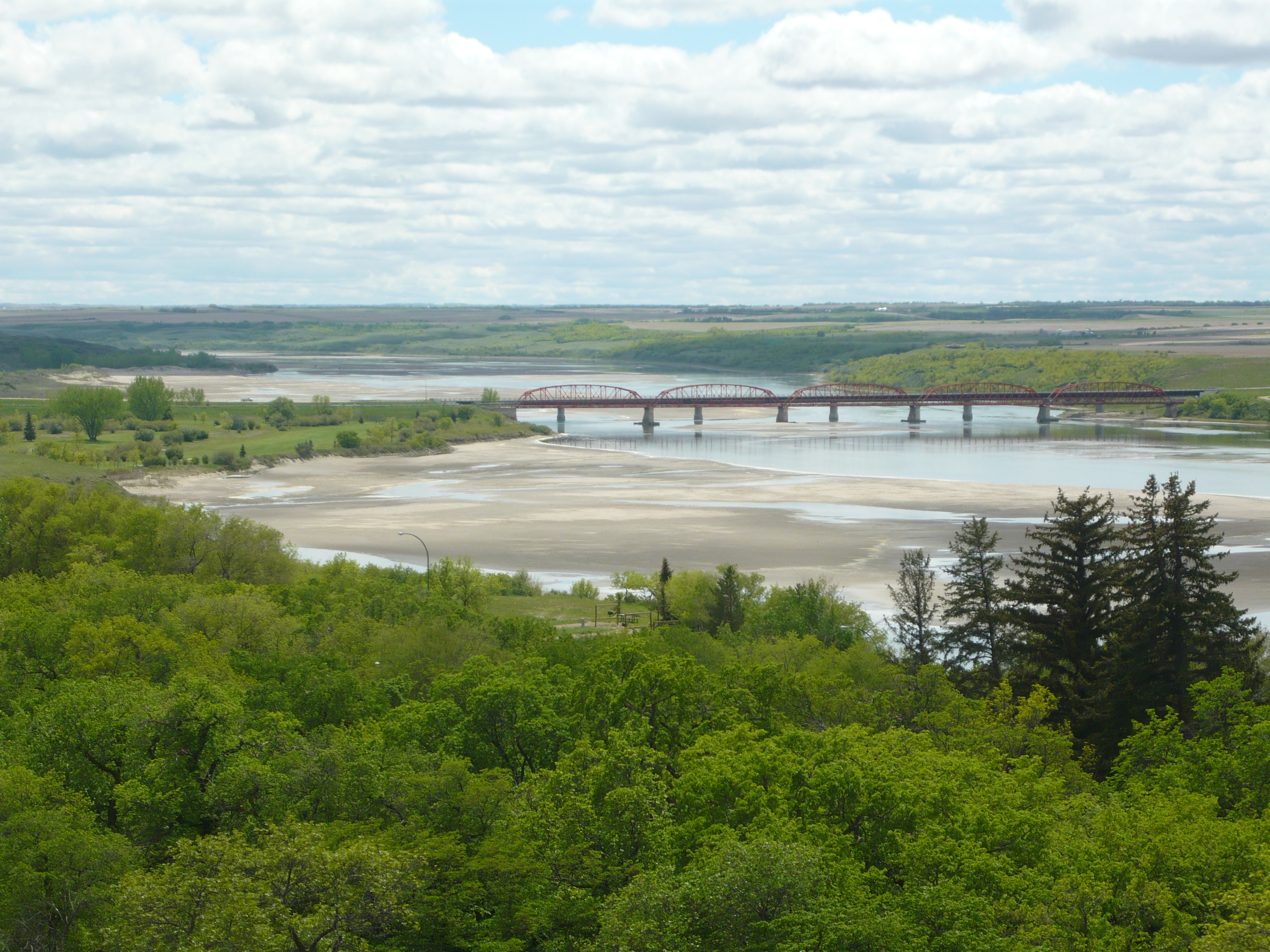
Highway 15 bridge

== Sports ==
The Outlook Recreation Complex has a skating rink, a 4-sheet curling rink, a bowling alley, and an indoor archery range. Adjacent are five baseball diamonds. As of 2021, The Outlook Recreation Complex also offers a multi-sport court in the summer months, including basketball, pickleball, shuffleboard, volleyball, badminton, lacrosse, floor hockey, and tennis.

The Jim Kook Arena in the Complex is home to many sports programs throughout the year, including the Outlook Minor Sports program. It is home to the Outlook Ice Hawks senior hockey team.

The Outlook Stock Car Association maintains a stock car 1/3 mile high banked clay oval track. The track runs 10 or more races a season.

The Van Raay & Community Swimming Pool was opened in 2019 and provides a venue for swimming lessons, public swimming, and additional aquatic programs. On January 20, 2024, a pipe in the facility burst, causing widespread flooding and damage which led to the pool being closed for the 2024 season and prompted a change in the pool's winterization procedures.

== Infrastructure ==
- Outlook Airport used to be located South East of Outlook. It was closed in 2019.
- Outlook used to have an award-winning recycling program. The Town of Outlook has recycled nearly three million pounds of cardboard as of 2003, and nearly 2 million pounds of newspaper. During 2019, the local program was scrapped for Loraas pickup based in Saskatoon due to high costs.

== Education ==
Outlook is located within the Sun West School Division.

- Outlook High School - a public school offering grades 6–12 which also houses the Wheatland Library Outlook Branch. Outlook High School is home to the Blues athletics program, which includes football, volleyball, basketball, badminton, curling and cross-country.
- Outlook Elementary School is a public school offering grades K–5.
- Lutheran Collegiate Bible Institute is a fully-accredited high school offering grades 9–12, with residences for 120 students.

== Notable people ==
- Charles Francis Bolton (born 1932) – neurologist
- Pete Ferry (1914–1971) – curler
- Marcia Kilgore (born 1968) – beauty industry entrepreneur
- Kirk Reynolds (born 1974) – Olympic sports shooter
- Samantha Ridgewell (born 1996) – professional ice hockey goaltender
- Don Saxton (born 1956) – Olympic volleyball player
- Logan Stephenson (born 1986) – professional ice hockey player
- Shay Stephenson (born 1983) – professional ice hockey player

== See also ==
- List of towns in Saskatchewan
