= Skytrail =

Bridge in Saskatchewan, Canada

SkyTrail
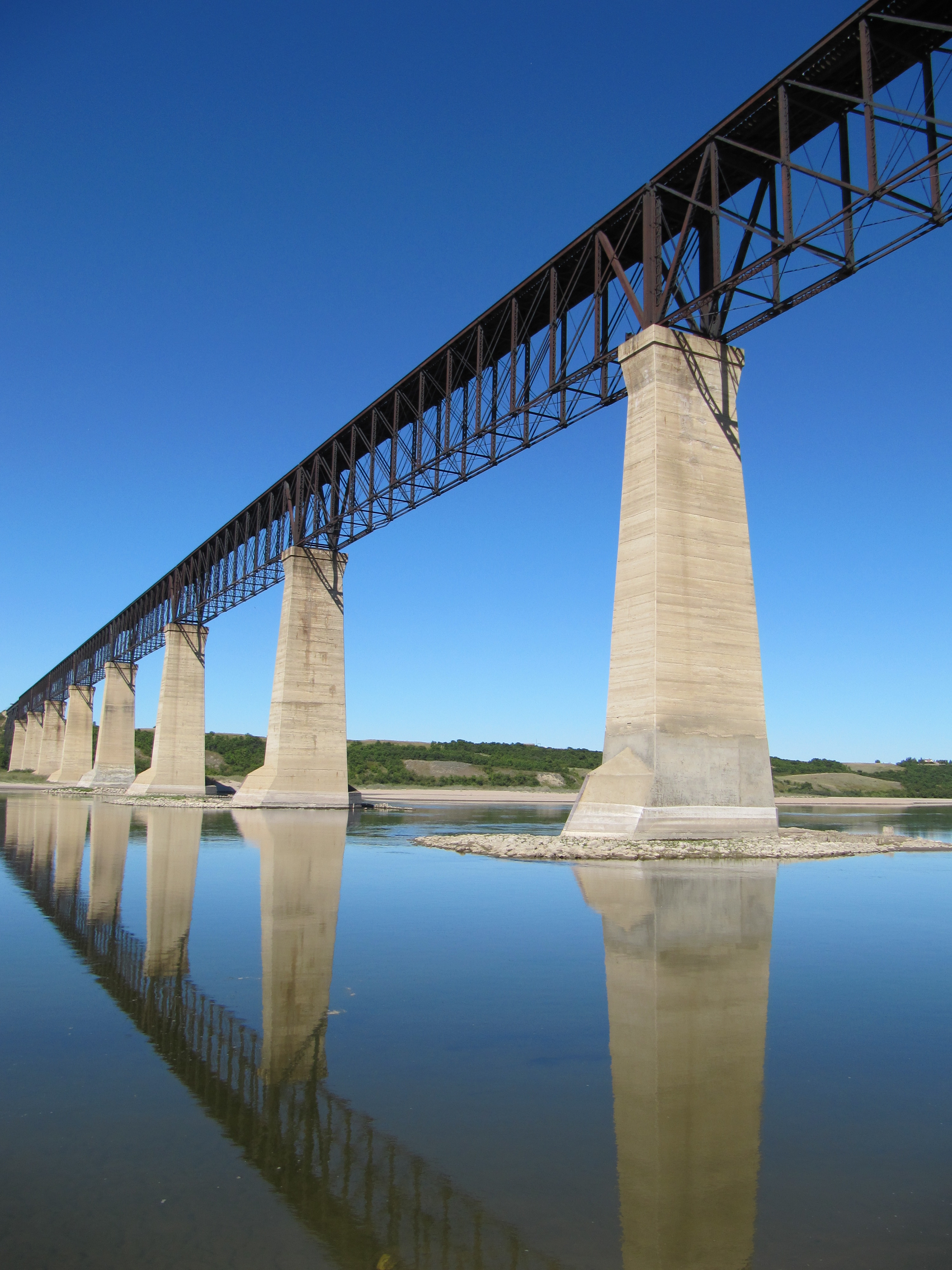
- Coordinates: 51°29′24.53″N 107°4′20.83″W
- Carries: Pedestrian (current); Railway (former)
- Crosses: South Saskatchewan River
- Locale: Outlook, Saskatchewan, Canada

Characteristics
- Design: Whipple Truss
- Material: Steel
- Total length: 3,000 feet (910 m)
- Height: 150 feet (46 m)
- Longest span: 242 feet (74 m)
- No. of spans: 8 main spans 19 approach spans

History
- Designer: J.D. McArthur and Company
- Construction start: January 24, 1910
- Construction end: October 23, 1912
- Opened: October 23, 1912
- Closed: March 16th, 1987 (railway); 2013 (pedestrians)

Location
- Interactive map of SkyTrail

The SkyTrail Bridge spans the South Saskatchewan River in Outlook, Saskatchewan, Canada. It was originally built by the Canadian Pacific Railway over the full width of the river's flood channel and has eight spans. It served as a railway bridge from October 23, 1912, until March 16, 1987. In 2003 it was converted to a pedestrian bridge and is now the longest pedestrian bridge in Canada. The bridge is part of the Trans-Canada Trail. Due to structural issues, the bridge has been closed since late 2013.

== Origins ==
The SkyTrail Bridge dates back as far as 1887, when it officially opened as the Saint-Laurent Railway Bridge in Montreal, Quebec. The bridge was deconstructed in 1911 to make way for a new, double track bridge parallel to the old single track bridge. The sections of the bridge were then transported to Outlook and used in the construction of the new Outlook Railway Bridge, which officially opened on October 23, 1912.

== Bridge Design ==
The SkyTrail features a fascinating bridge design known as a whipple truss — and the SkyTrail features the longest known Whipple trusses in Canada and North America. On their own, Whipple trusses are very difficult to find in Canada, but the SkyTrail features a rare Whipple deck truss instead of the slightly more common Whipple through-truss, giving the bridge even more rarity.

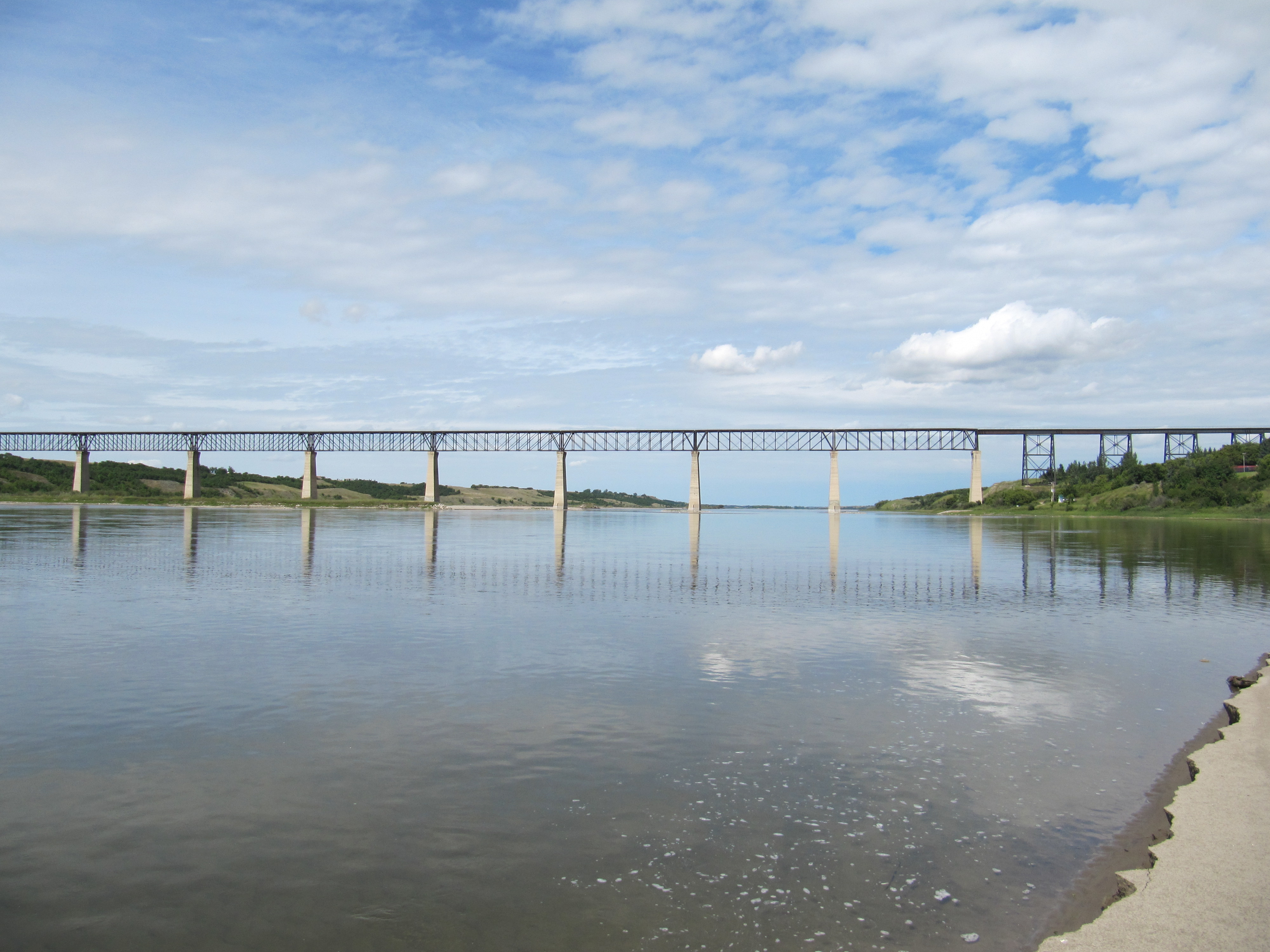
A panorama view of the Skytrail

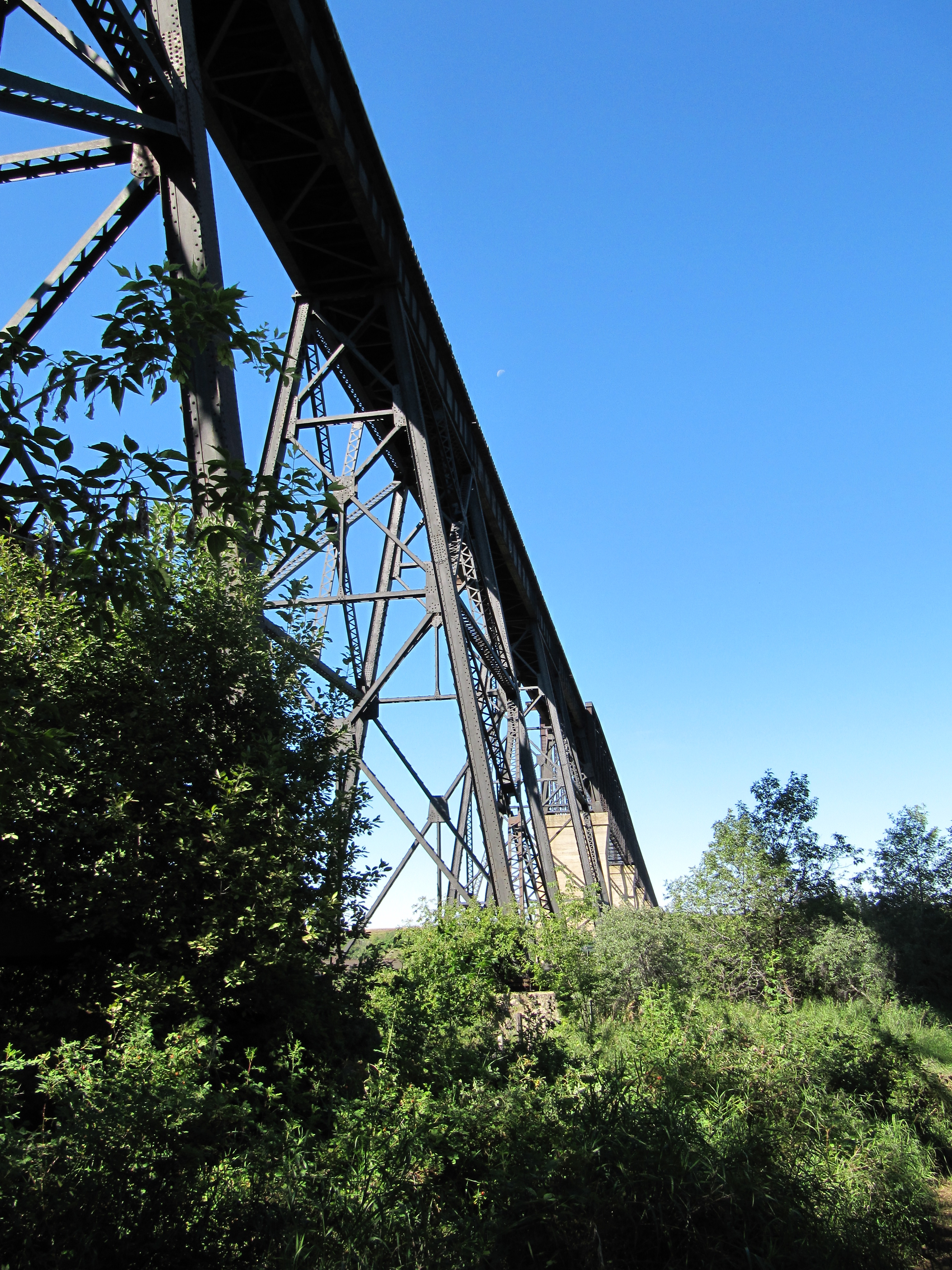
View from below the bridge

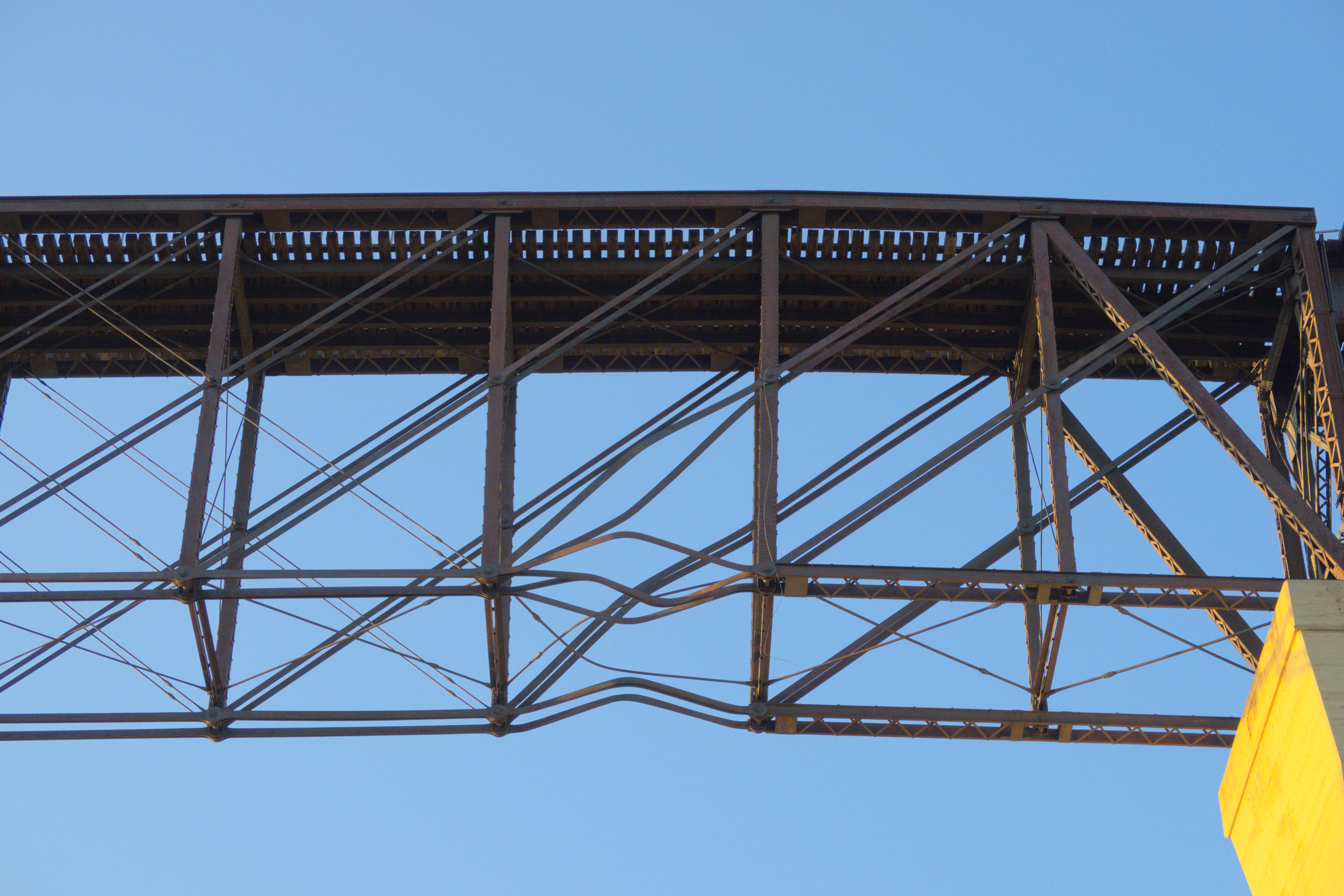
Buckling truss members near eastern end, 2025

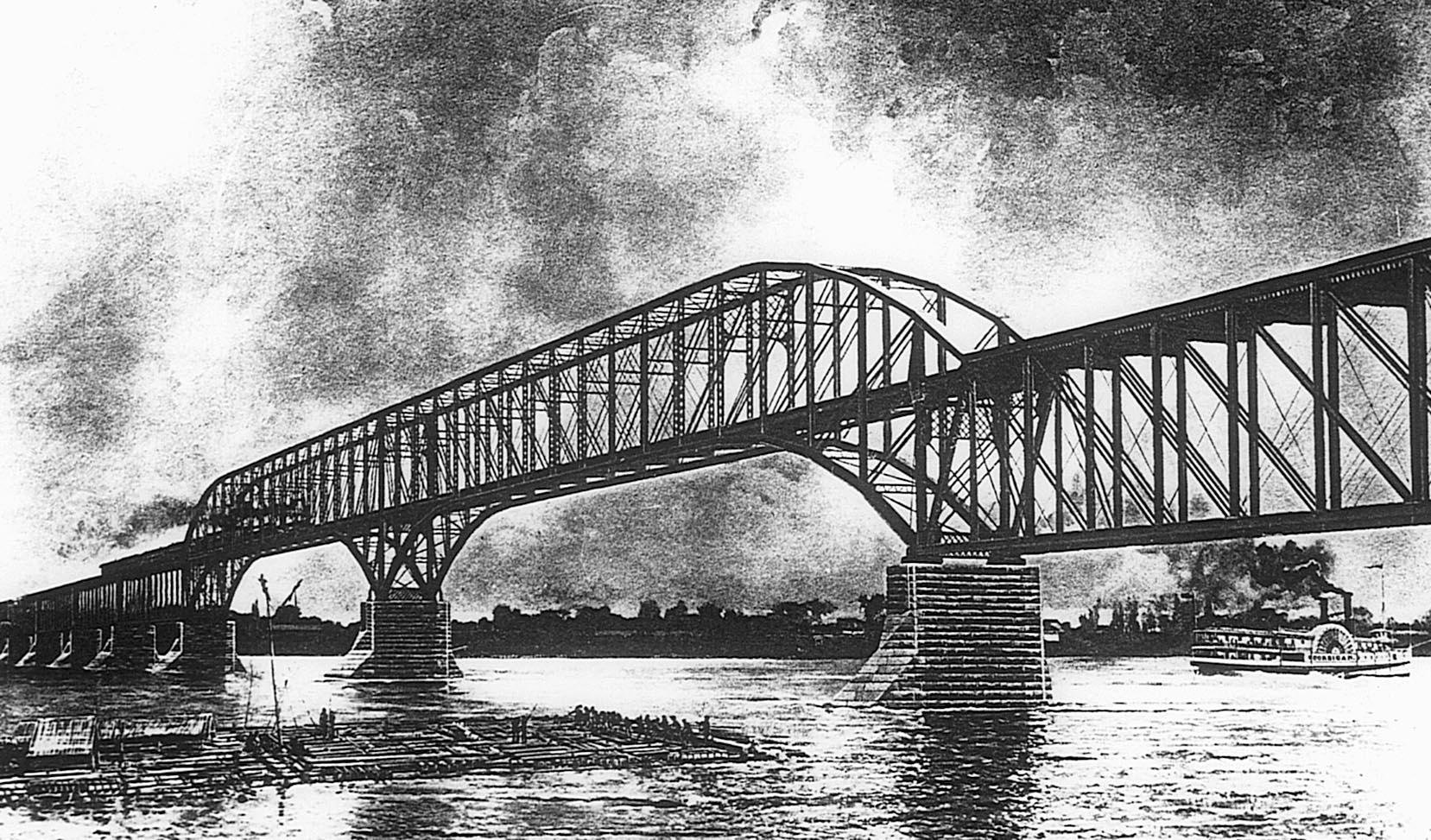
The original bridge in Montreal, c. 1885

== See also ==
- List of crossings of the South Saskatchewan River
- List of bridges in Canada
