= Marcia Kilgore =

Canadian born entrepreneur

Marcia Kilgore (born October 16, 1968) is a Canadian entrepreneur who has founded several companies in the beauty and footwear industries, including Fitflop, Soap and Glory and Beauty Pie.

== Early life and education ==
Kilgore was born in Outlook, Saskatchewan. After graduating from high school from Evan Hardy Collegiate in Canada, she moved to New York City to study at Columbia University. Unable to attend the university due to missing a student loan deadline, she began working as a personal trainer, eventually working for a number of celebrity clients. She also began taking classes part-time at New York University.

== Career ==
=== Bliss ===
During college, Kilgore became a personal trainer to make money. Soon after she decided to take a course in skincare, largely because she had personally suffered from acne since her preteen years. She began giving facials to her friends out of her East Village apartment. She opened her first single-room office in New York's Soho district in 1991, followed by the opening of a three-room mini-spa called Let's Face It! in June 1993.

In the late 1980s, Kilgore opened Let's Face It!, a skincare treatment center, in New York City. Inspired by her own preteen struggles with acne, she opened Bliss Spa in 1993, continuing to cater to celebrity clients.

To accommodate increasing demand, Kilgore opened the first Bliss Spa in SoHo in 1996. Bliss sells a line of beauty and health products, many of which are meant to allow customers to recreate the spa experience at home. Bliss spa is credited for starting the mid 1990s spa boom. Its products and services are marketed with humorous names and slogans, and by a playful "Blissgirl" character illustration which appears on products, catalogs and the company website. She is almost always dressed in a signature white towel and Bliss’ Softening Socks and Glamour Gloves.

In 1999, she was approached by LVMH who wanted to buy stake in the company, though still allowing her to remain Executive Director. With the newly found access to capital, Kilgore expanded the business by opening another Manhattan location. She later launched Bliss-Labs, a product line of Bliss Spa focused on skincare products and bath treatments.

In January 2004, Starwood acquired Bliss spa from LVMH for $25 million. As part of the acquisition, Starwood launched Bliss Spas in several of its W Hotels in an effort to move its W hotel brand into the resort business. The first to be opened, that same year, was Bliss 49 in the W New York Union Square. During the next two years spas were opened in the company's hotels in San Francisco, Chicago, Los Angeles, and Dallas.

=== Soap & Glory ===
In 2006, Kilgore launched Soap & Glory, a line of affordable bath, body and cosmetic products. Soap & Glory was bought by Alliance Boots in 2014. The business was influenced by H&M offering affordable designer products through fast fashion and newly raised environmental awareness during the time. It was launched at Harvey Nichols and Boots in Britain with almost $100 million of revenue over a few years.

=== FitFlop ===
In 2007, Kilgore founded FitFlop footwear, which is a brand of biomechanically engineered shoes and sold globally. Uma Thurman fronted their 'Shoes For Superwomen' campaign in 2017 and 2018. FitFlop has sold more than 65 million pairs and are available in 75 countries.

=== Soaper Duper ===
In October 2016, Kilgore launched Soaper Duper, a range of naturally-derived, vegan and cruelty-free bath and body products, with recycled and recyclable plastic packaging.

=== Beauty Pie ===
In December 2016, Kilgore launched Beauty Pie, a direct-to-consumer, membership-based luxury beauty products on-line brand.

== Awards ==
- 2004 Bliss Soho wins Conde Nast Day Spa Awards.
- 2009 Innovation of the Year Award from Harper's Bazaar Magazine.
- 2020 Beauty Independent Beacon Award Winner.
- 2021 British Vogue Beauty Award winner.
- 2023 British Vogue 25 Power List.
- 2024 World Retail Congress Retail Entrepreneur Of The Year.
