= ISS Hockey =

ISS Hockey (International Scouting Services), founded in 2002, is an independent scouting service which focuses on ice hockey players aged 14 to 19.

Owned by Siegel Enterprises, ISS Hockey is based out of Toronto, Ontario in Canada, and Boca Raton, Florida in the United States, with Stu Siegel as the organization's CEO.

ISS scouts, evaluates, and ranks players internationally. Its clients include the National Hockey League teams; major junior and university/college teams in Canada and the United States; and sports publications and media, including The Hockey News, and The Sports Network.
