= Brookline, Pennsylvania =

- Unincorporated community
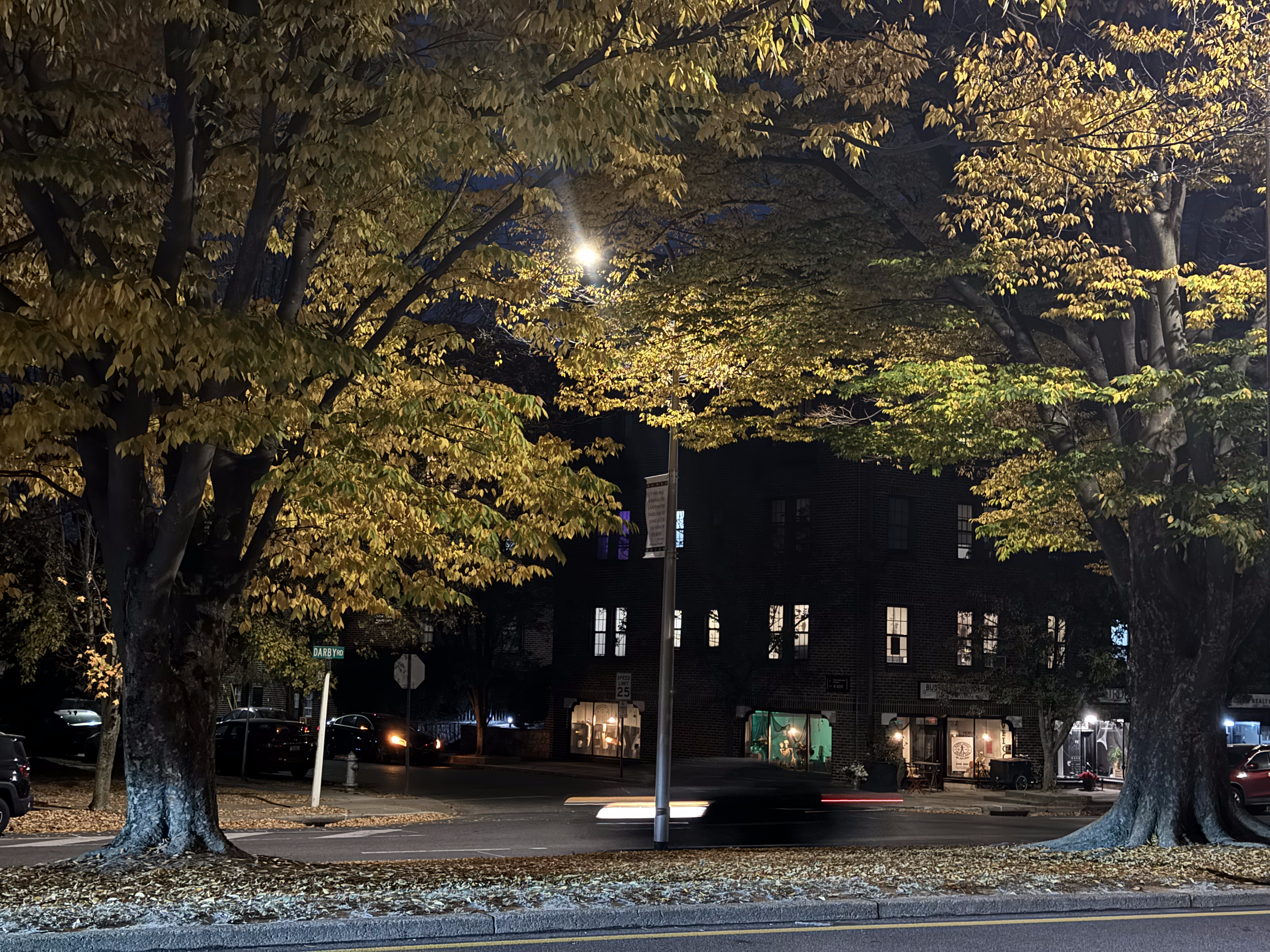
- Darby Road in Brookline

- Location within Pennsylvania Location within the United States
- Country: United States
- State: Pennsylvania
- County: Delaware
- Township: Haverford

Population
  - Total: 2,272
- Time zone: UTC-5 (Eastern (EST))
  - Summer (DST): UTC-4 (EDT)
- Area codes: 610 and 484
- GNIS feature ID: 1170327

Brookline is an unincorporated community in Haverford Township in Delaware County, Pennsylvania, United States. Its boundaries are approximately between Mill Road and Manoa Road on its North and South side and Darby Road and Earlington Road on its West and East sides. It neighbors the unincorporated communities of Llanerch, Oakmont, Beechwood, Penfield, Woodmere Park, and Chatham Park in Haverford. It is a commuting suburb of Philadelphia. Brookline and Oakmont together are considered the town center of Haverford.

== History ==
The land that would become Brookline was originally owned, at the time of William Penn and the Welsh Tract, by Lewis David in 1681. The land was sold to William Powell and Henry Lewis in 1682. The indication of land ownership shortly before the planning of the neighborhood was from the 1902 Baist map, showing farmers Anderson, Johnson, and Davis as owners. One of Haverford Township's present-day streets is named Davis after one of these early 20th-century landowners. By the time of the neighborhood's planning and development, the area that was to become Brookline largely fell over the farming estate of Daniel Hagey, bounded between Mill Road and Manoa Road.

Darby Road, one of the earliest roads in the Township, was created in 1687 to connect Quaker houses of worship between Haverford Township and what would become Lower Merion. It was originally called Haverford Road. Darby Road became the major thoroughfare of the Brookline neighborhood.

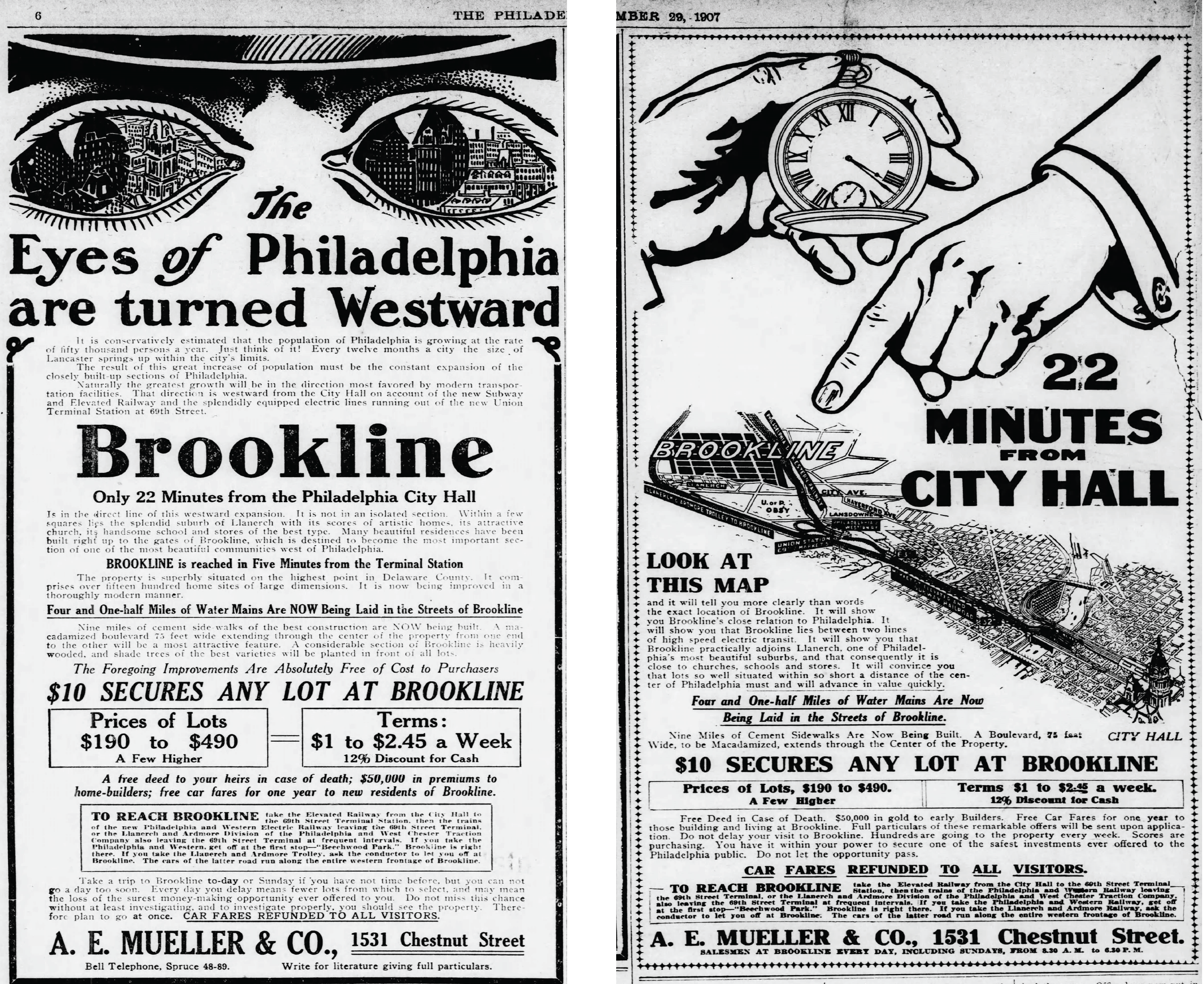
Advertisements in the Philadelphia Inquirer for the Brookline neighborhood, highlighting its transit service, September 1907.

The layout of the Brookline neighborhood spans between two historic train lines, one extant and one extinct. In 1904, the Philadelphia & Western (P&W) began to acquire properties west of Philadelphia to build a high-speed electric railroad from 69th Street in Upper Darby to Strafford. Today, this line is known as the Norristown High Speedline, or the M Line. In Haverford Township, these developments, including Brookline, followed Cobb's Creek. The P&W began operating in 1907. On the other side of Brookline along Darby Road was the Llanerch and Ardmore Trolley line, which opened in 1902. A.E. Mueller and Co., an active building firm in the Western Suburbs of Philadelphia, took advantage of the trolley line on Darby Road and the P&W line to develop the Brookline neighborhood. Advertisements boasted a trip from City Hall to Brookline in 22 minutes. The neighborhood was specifically marketed as a commuting suburb by "elevated subway route" to Center City, making it an early 20th-century example of a streetcar suburb. A bus service ran between these two train lines down the neighborhood's boulevard, Brookline Boulevard. The earliest development plan for Brookline dates to 1909. By May 1910, 30 houses had been completed. The development of Brookline was completed by the late 1920s and early 1930s.

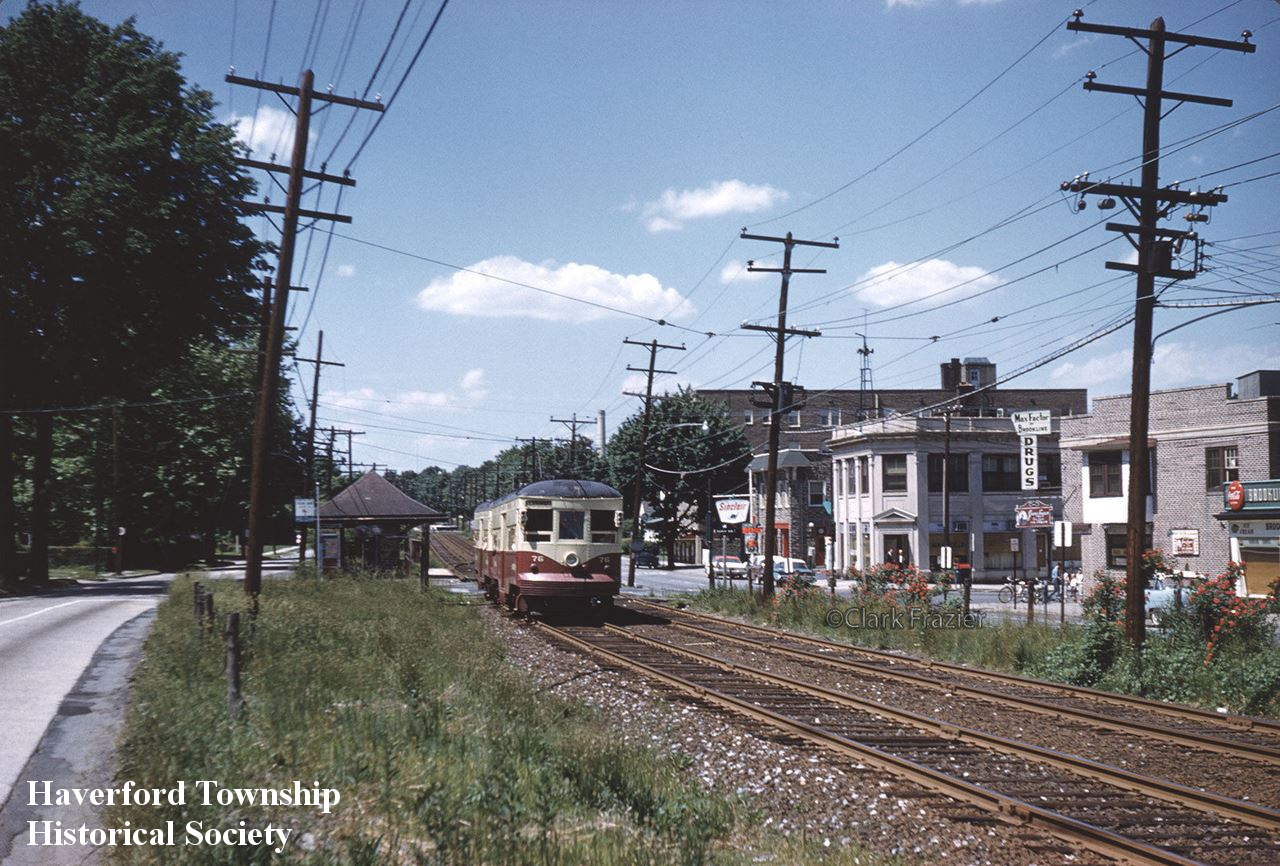
The Ardmore Trolley Line station in Brookline, shortly before its closure.

Properties on Brookline Boulevard were originally intended for houses. By the 1920s, the corner of Darby Road and Brookline Boulevard began to see new businesses. Brookline Boulevard, at its meeting with Darby Road, developed as a business district due to the presence of the trolley stop. The business district included a retail, grocery, and a movie theater. Though the Ardmore Trolley line closed in 1966, its influence on the built form of Haverford Township and Brookline continues with its street-fronting commercial areas around former trolley stations.

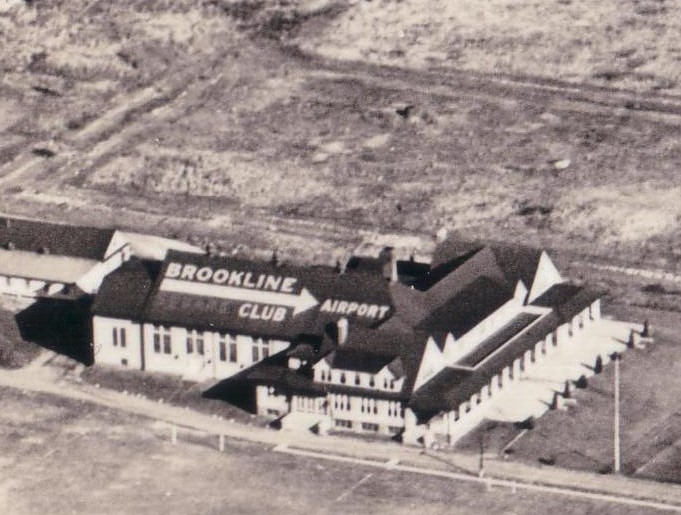
The Brookline Square Club and airport

Brookline is served by the Haverford Township School District, Haverford Township Police Department, and the Brookline Fire Company (1916). The Brookline School, designed by architect David Knickerbacker Boyd, was built in 1913 to serve the Brookline neighborhood. It was demolished in 2022 amid some controversy over the historic value of the building, as an example of early 20th century American Colonial revival architecture. Of the four schools built in this style in the early 19th century only two survive, the Oakmont School and the Llanerch School. Community members of Oakmont, Llanerch and Brookline in particular were instrumental in the establishment of the Haverford Township Free Library, at the first meeting to discuss creating a library for Haverford Township in 1933. The neighborhood also had a country club, called the Brookline Square Club (1925) and small airport, located behind the High School, now the Haverford Township Middle School. The site of the club and the airport is now Haverford High School. The neighborhood's closest train station is the M Line Beechwood-Brookline Station.

== Demographics ==
Brookline Boulevard

As of the 2020 census, there were 2,272 people. The median age was 38.7 years. The racial makeup of Brookline was 91.7% white, 1.6% African American, 0.1% American Indian and Alaska Native, 2.1% Asian, 1.1% from some other race, and 3.4% from two or more races. 22.5% of the population of Brookline was under 18. The average family size was 3.3. There were 757 households, of which 85.3% were families. There were 830 total housing units.

The age distribution was 22.3% under the age of 18, 7.8% from 18 to 24, 15.6% from 25 to 34, 14.2% from 35 to 44, 23.4% from 45 to 64, and 9.8% who were 65 years of age or older. The median age was approximately 41 years. For every 100 females, there were 95.9 males.

Indicated in the 2023 American Community Survey, 59.7% of the population 25 years and older had a bachelor's degree or higher. The median household income was $132,639. The median family income was $153,250.
