= Beechwood–Brookline station =

Rapid transit station in Pennsylvania

Beechwood–Brookline
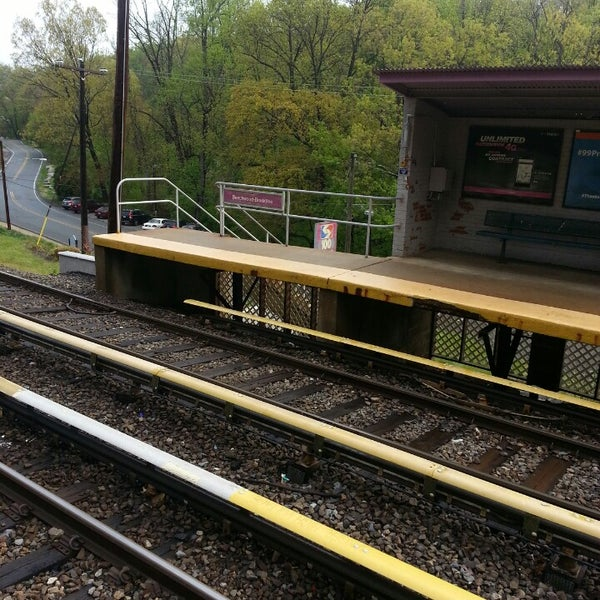
- Beechwood–Brookline station

General information
- Location: Edgewood and Strathmore Roads; Haverford Township, Pennsylvania.
- Coordinates: 39.9865°N 75.2916°W
- Owner: SEPTA
- Platforms: 2 side platforms
- Tracks: 2

Construction
- Parking: Yes
- Accessible: No

History
- Opened: 1907
- Electrified: Third rail
- Former names: Beechwood Park (1907–)

Services
Preceding station	SEPTA Metro	Following station
Wynnewood Road toward Norristown T.C.	M (SEPTA Metro)	Penfield toward 69th Street T.C.
Former services
Preceding station	Lehigh Valley Transit Company	Following station
Wynnewood Road toward Allentown	Liberty Bell High Speed Line Until 1951	Penfield toward 69th Street
Preceding station	Philadelphia and Western Railroad	Following station
Wynnewood Road toward Strafford	Strafford Branch Until 1956	Penfield toward 69th Street
Location

Beechwood–Brookline station is a SEPTA Metro rapid transit station in Haverford Township, Pennsylvania. It serves the M and is located at Edgewood and Strathmore Roads, although SEPTA gives the address as Beechwood and Karakung Drives. All trains stop at Beechwood–Brookline. The station lies 2.5 track miles (4.0 km) from 69th Street Transit Center. It serves the walkable, pre-War neighborhoods of Beechwood and Brookline. It is also situated closely to Haverford's middle and high schools. The station has off-street parking available.

The land use around the station is single-family residential and recreation. There is a small shopping district on Edgewood Road in the Brookline/Penfield neighborhoods. It has the third highest boardings of Haverford Township stations, after Ardmore Junction and Penfield, taking 5 minutes to arrive at 69th Street Transportation Center. 69% of commuters parking at the station live within a mile of the station and 36% live within a half mile. There is no bicycle infrastructure at the station.

The station is located near the Haverford Heritage Trail, a segment of trail in the Powder Mill Valley that is part of the proposed Forge-to-Refuge circuit trail.

== History ==
The Beechwood–Brookline station was pivotal in the development of the Beechwood and Brookline neighborhoods in Haverford Township, both of which are examples of early 20th century streetcar suburbs.

Beechwood Park opened in 1907 as the first stop north of the Philadelphia and Western Railroad southern terminus. The railroad opened Beechwood Amusement Park adjacent to the site to attract patrons. It cost $200,000 to construct, or $6.7 million in equivalent purchasing power in 2025. Attractions of the park included a double wire act, a Venetian gondola, carrousel, roller coaster, merry-go-round, hippodrome, pony track, a "moving picture show", shooting gallery, miniature railway, double trapeze, acrobats and aerialists, and a circus of trained Scotch collie dogs. The opulently run park quickly ran into financial difficulties, losing $700 a week, or $23,494 in equivalent 2025 dollars, by July 1907. The financial woes of the park were blamed on "bad weather and some features of the management". The park operated only until 1908. It was sold at auction on January 19, 1909, to a sole bidder who was "anxious to secure the property to save the expense of foreclosure proceedings". The remnants are within sight of the station, a lone buttress or foundation that sticks out upon a hill overlooking the station.

== Gallery ==
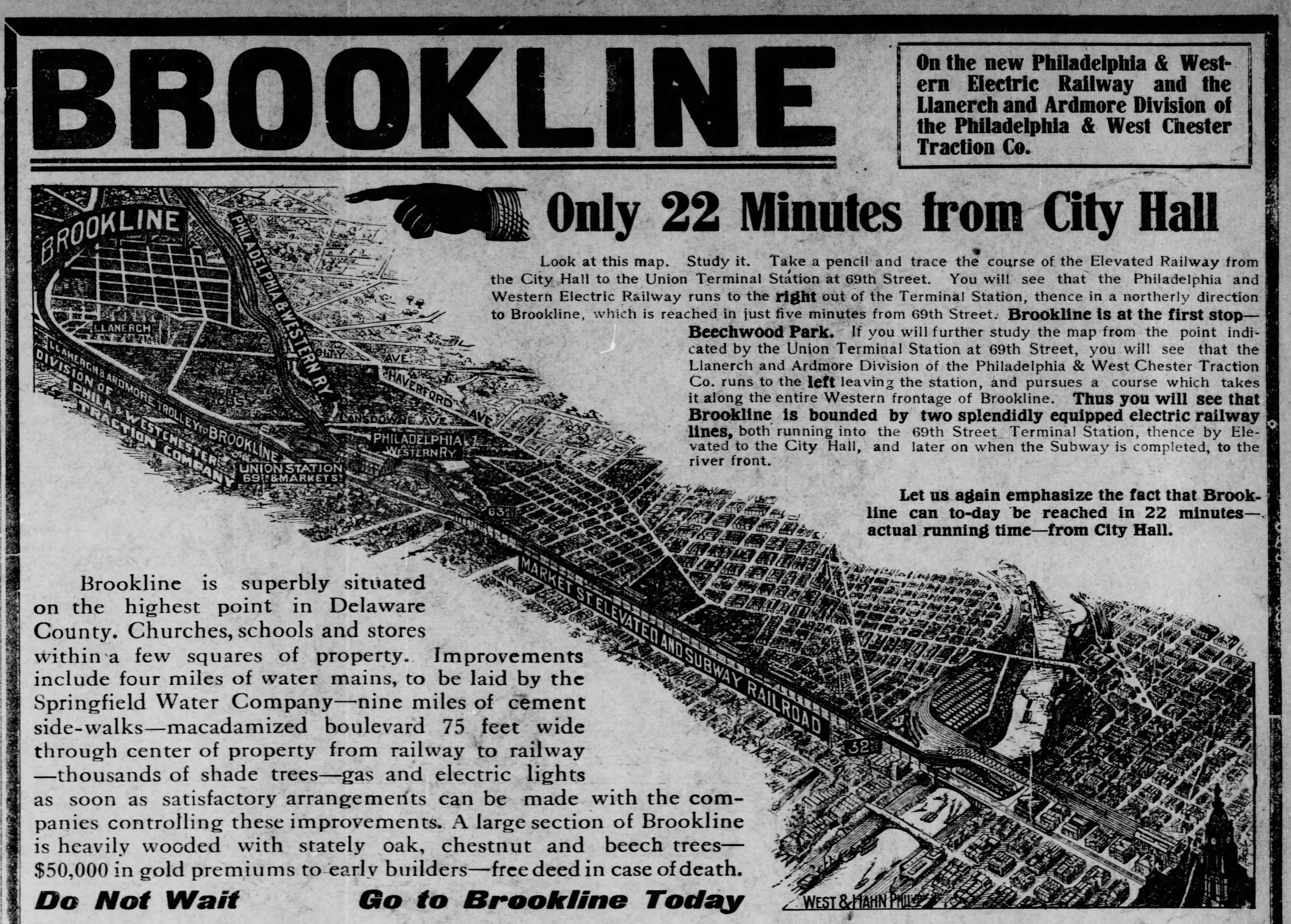
Advertisement for the Brookline neighborhood, anchored by the Beechwood-Brookline Station.

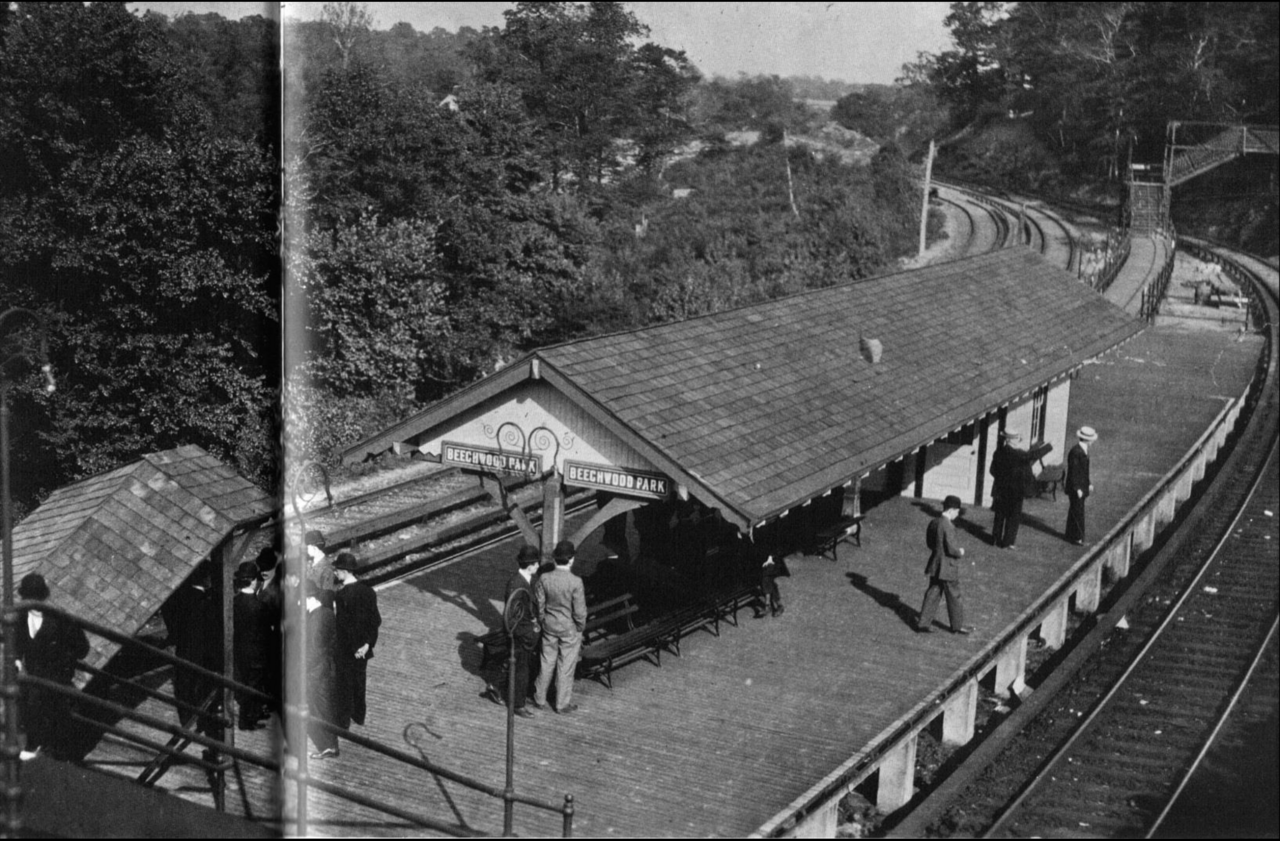
Beechwood-Brookline Station in 1907

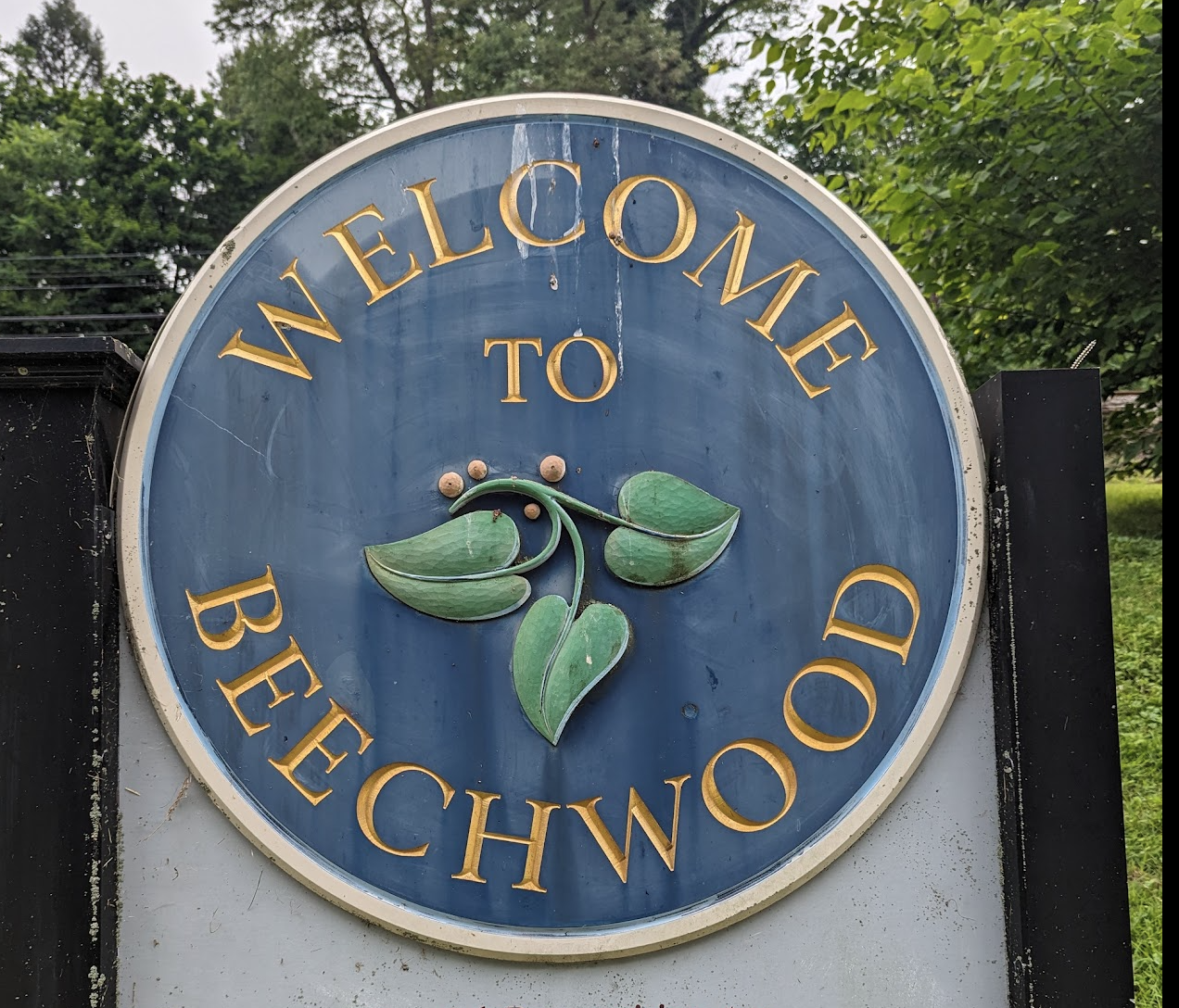
Sign on the slope of the station along Karakung Drive, welcoming the Beechwood neighborhood.

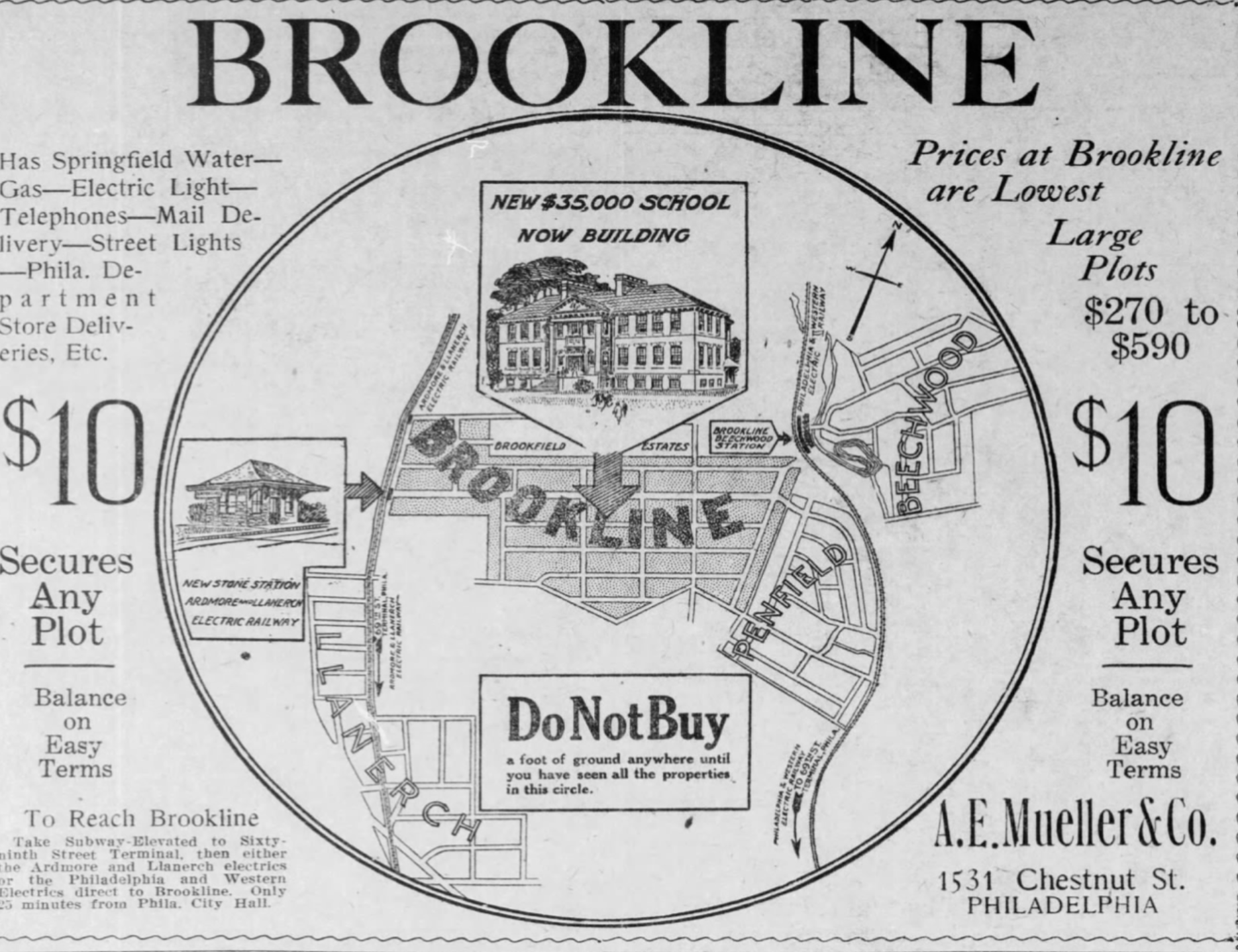
Streetcar Suburban neighborhoods serviced by the station, centered on this map.

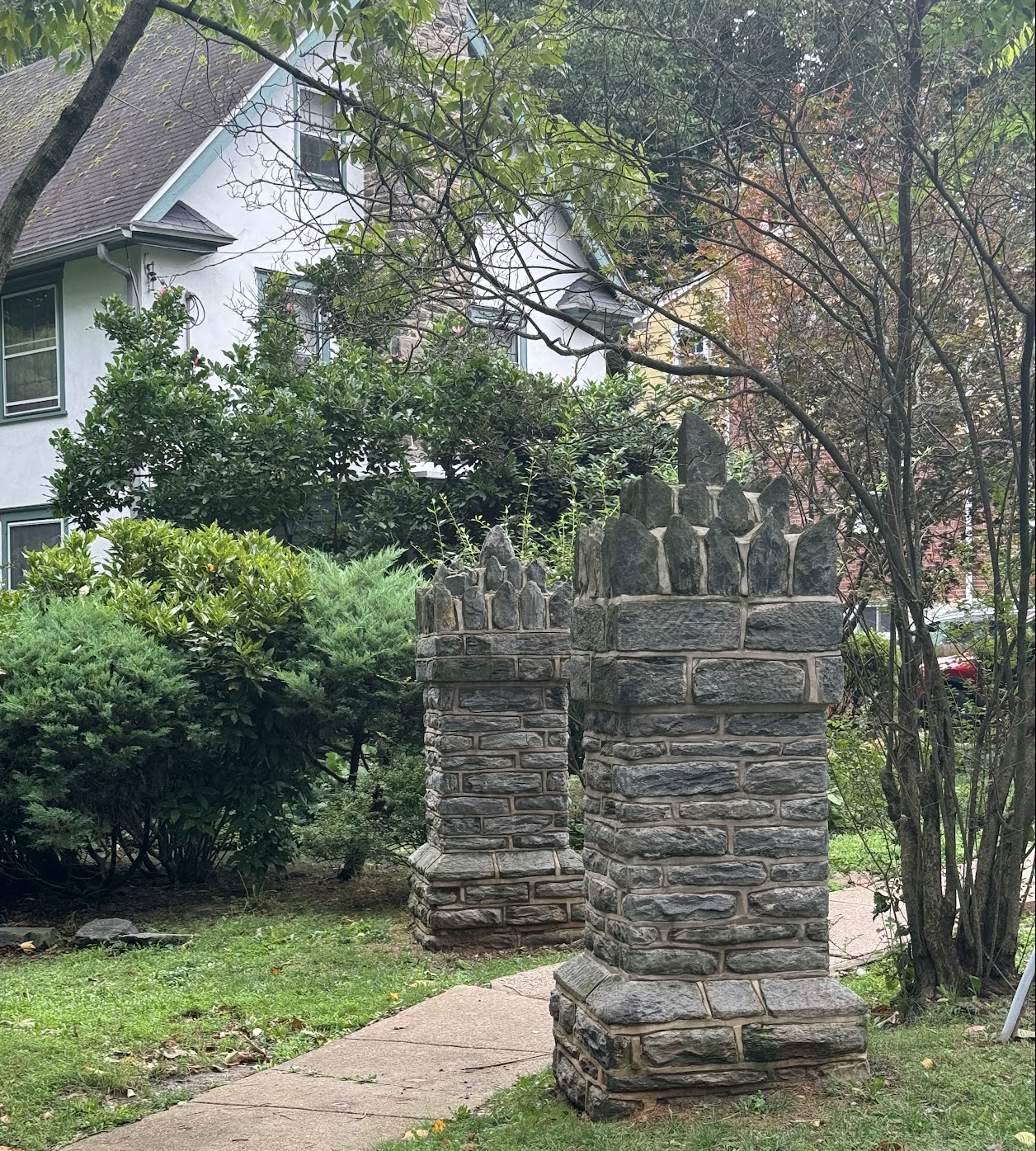
Stone Pillars installed by the developers A.E. Mueller to welcome prospective Brookline home buyers as they got off at the station

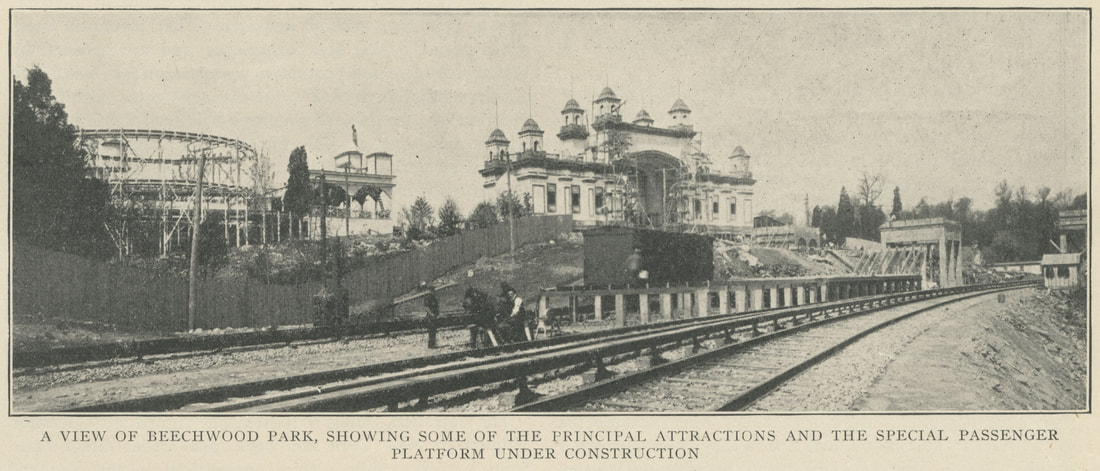
Beechwood Amusement Park, 1907
