= Llanerch, Pennsylvania =

Unincorporated community in Pennsylvania, US

- Unincorporated community
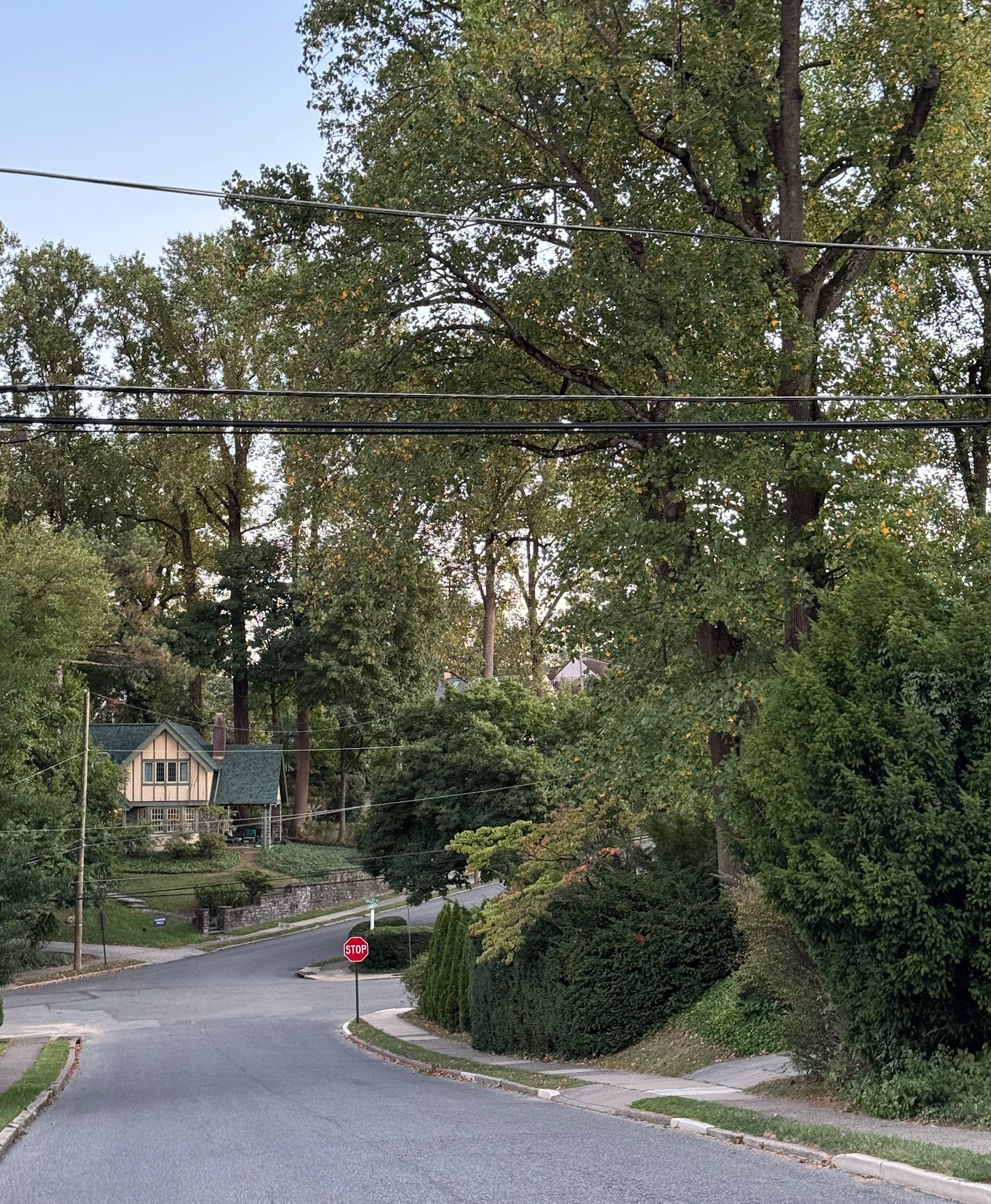
- Valley Road in Llanerch

- Location within Pennsylvania Location within the United States
- Coordinates: 39°58′17″N 75°17′57″W
- Country: United States
- State: Pennsylvania
- County: Delaware
- Township: Haverford
- Elevation: 278 ft (85 m)

Population
  - Total: 1,162
- Time zone: UTC-5 (Eastern (EST))
  - Summer (DST): UTC-4 (EDT)
- Area codes: 610 and 484
- GNIS feature ID: 1179730

Llanerch is an unincorporated community in Haverford Township in Delaware County, Pennsylvania, located around the intersection of U.S. Route 1, Pennsylvania Route 3, and Darby Road. The name Llanerch means "open space" in Welsh. It is a commuting suburb of Philadelphia, and one of the earliest-developed neighborhoods in Haverford.

== History ==
Prior to colonization, Llanerch was land belonging to the Lenape tribe. It fell under possession of William Penn by royal charter, and was subsequently settled by Welsh Quakers in what is known as the Welsh Tract. The land that would become Llanerch was originally granted to Lewis David, a Welsh Quaker. The Welsh farmers that settled Llanerch include the names Bewley, Davis, Albertson and Taylor. Bewley and Davis are two road names in the present day neighborhood. The Welsh influence is also apparent through road names such as "Llandillo" and "Llandaff". The name Llanerch itself derives from Llannerch, an abolished Welsh commote.

Until the 1890s, Llanerch remained mostly undeveloped, with only a handful of families occupying the area. The use of the name in the area dates at least to 1867. Following the development of railway in nearby Philadelphia and the growth of the now-extinct trolley lines down West Chester Pike and Darby Road, Llanerch's population grew as the area became a junction between the city and many smaller, nearby boroughs. Llanerch, as closely tied to the train and trolley routes, was considered alongside many of the early 20th century western suburbs as a development within the Main Line train catchment.

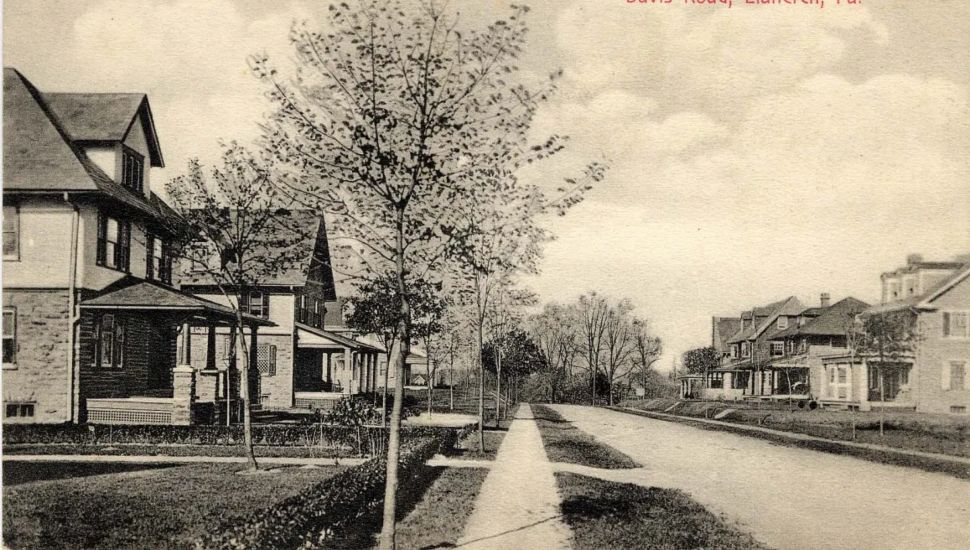
Davis Road in the Llanerch before electrification and the widespread uptake of the automobile.

The 1895 subdivision development in Llanerch was one of the Township's first, with twelve dwellings constructed by architects Robert G. Kennedy and Frank A. Hays who both resided in the neighborhood. Frank A. Hays left the firm Kennedy, Hays & Kelsey shortly after completing much of the design work of Llanerch, becoming a professor of ink and rendering at the University of Pennsylvania School of Architecture. The two purchased 200 acres of "beautiful rolling ground" from businessman Henry Albertson, with the highest point of the site allowing a view of Philadelphia City Hall. Llanerch was described as being built upon a high knoll and as an upland, that was "high, dry, cool" with access to freshwater from the Springfield Water Company. The new subdivision was planned with "Telford roads, granolithic pavements, under drains, [and] electric lights" with a minimum lot size of 50 by 150 feet. The streets were laid out to magnify the distance between one home and next, offering focal points and a sense of destination between houses. Llanerch was the first subdivision in Haverford to use deed restrictions, setbacks and minimum home costs.

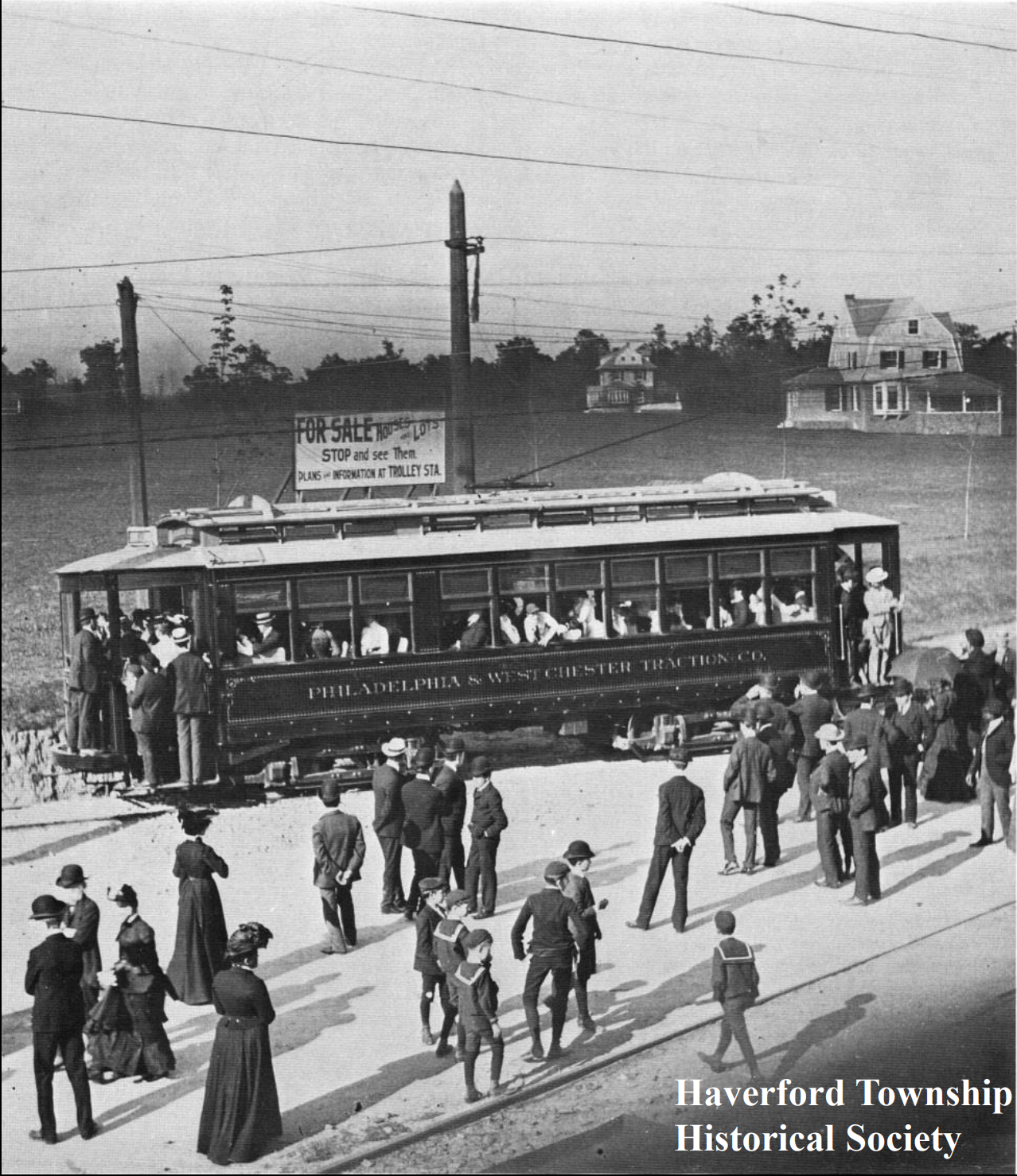
The ceremonial first trolley at Llanerch Junction, May 29, 1902.

Most of the early subdivisions in Haverford, such as Preston, Millbrook, South Ardmore, Brookline, Beechwood and Penfield, were streetcar suburbs along trolley and train lines that served as a key mode of transportation. Llanerch had two lines meeting at Llanerch Junction by the end of the 19th century and a further third line to Ardmore in 1902. Three lines of the four original Haverford Township lines, the two trolley lines on Darby Road and West Chester Pike and the Newtown Square Branch of the Pennsylvania Railroad, met in Llanerch. The fourth line, the Norristown High Speed Line, still runs along the eastern edge of Haverford Township.

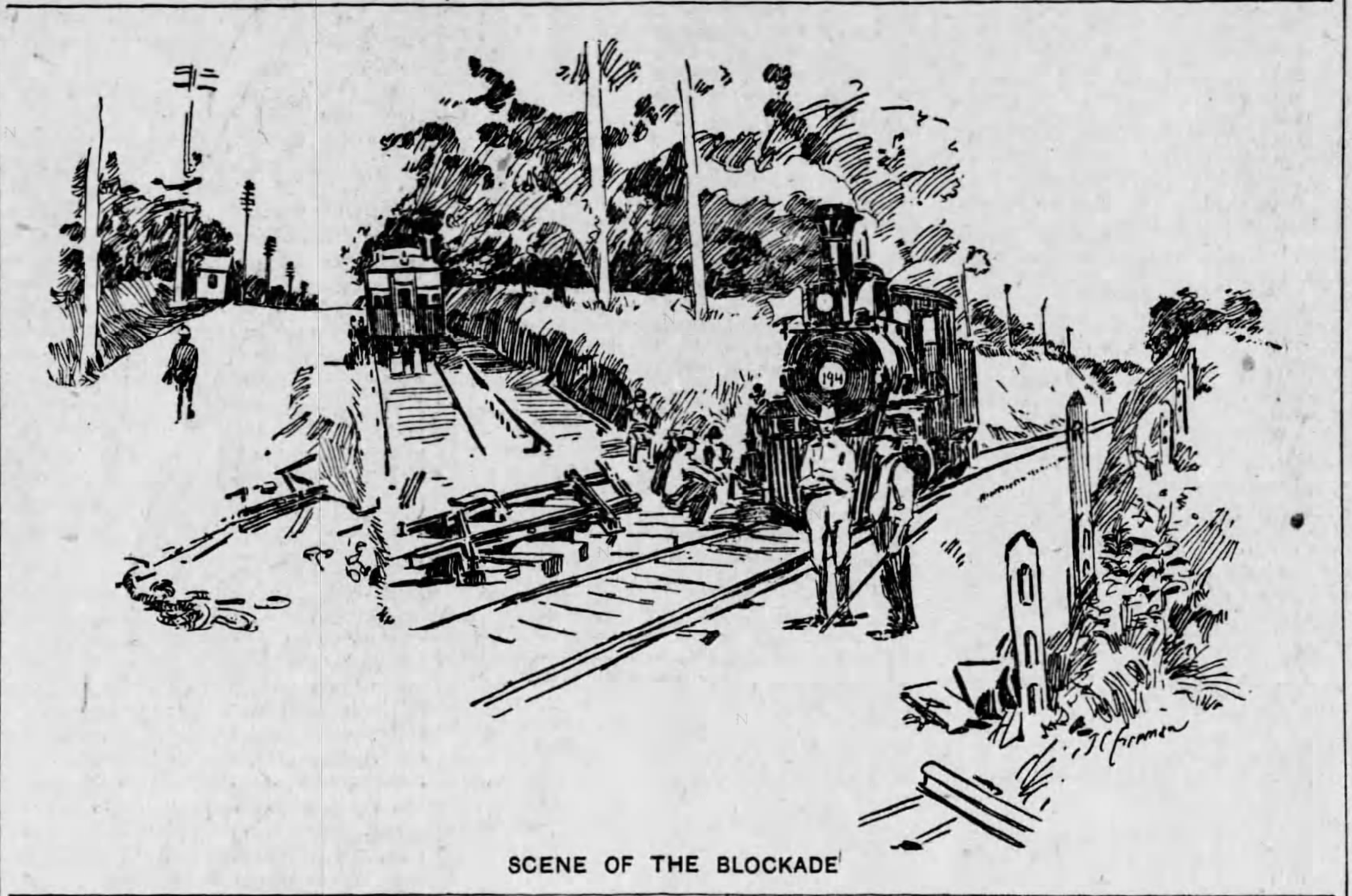
A sketch of the blockade at Llanerch Crossing by the Philadelphia Inquirer in 1895, erected by engineers of the Pennsylvania Railroad Company to prevent the Philadelphia and Castle Rock Transit Company crossing the tracks of its Delaware County branch.

The meeting of the train lines in Llanerch led to conflict. It began over disagreements over the right to string electrical wires for intersecting train lines and the laying of tracks. "The Battle of Llanerch Crossing" (1895) was a land rights battle between railway companies which ended at a crossroads in Llanerch, culminating in a ruling at the Pennsylvania Supreme Court. There is a memorial to the historical background involving the case in the form of Llanerch Crossing, a small park with a mural and markers detailing the history of the feud.

Llanerch is a politically active community. Its first association was formed in 1904, the Llanerch Citizen's Association, which included a special patrol officer that acted as a form of policeman. The same association held a "mass meeting" in 1910 to protest the Springfield Water Company that raised rates in three counties. In 1916, a group of Llanerch residents pushed to create an independent borough, carved out of Haverford Township. The group, citing an irritation of "not getting back enough in betterments for the amount of taxes it pays into the Township treasury." The campaign to create a borough for Llanerch was unsuccessful. In the mid to late 1980s, the Llanerch Civic Association banded to oppose the conversion the Llanerch School into offices.

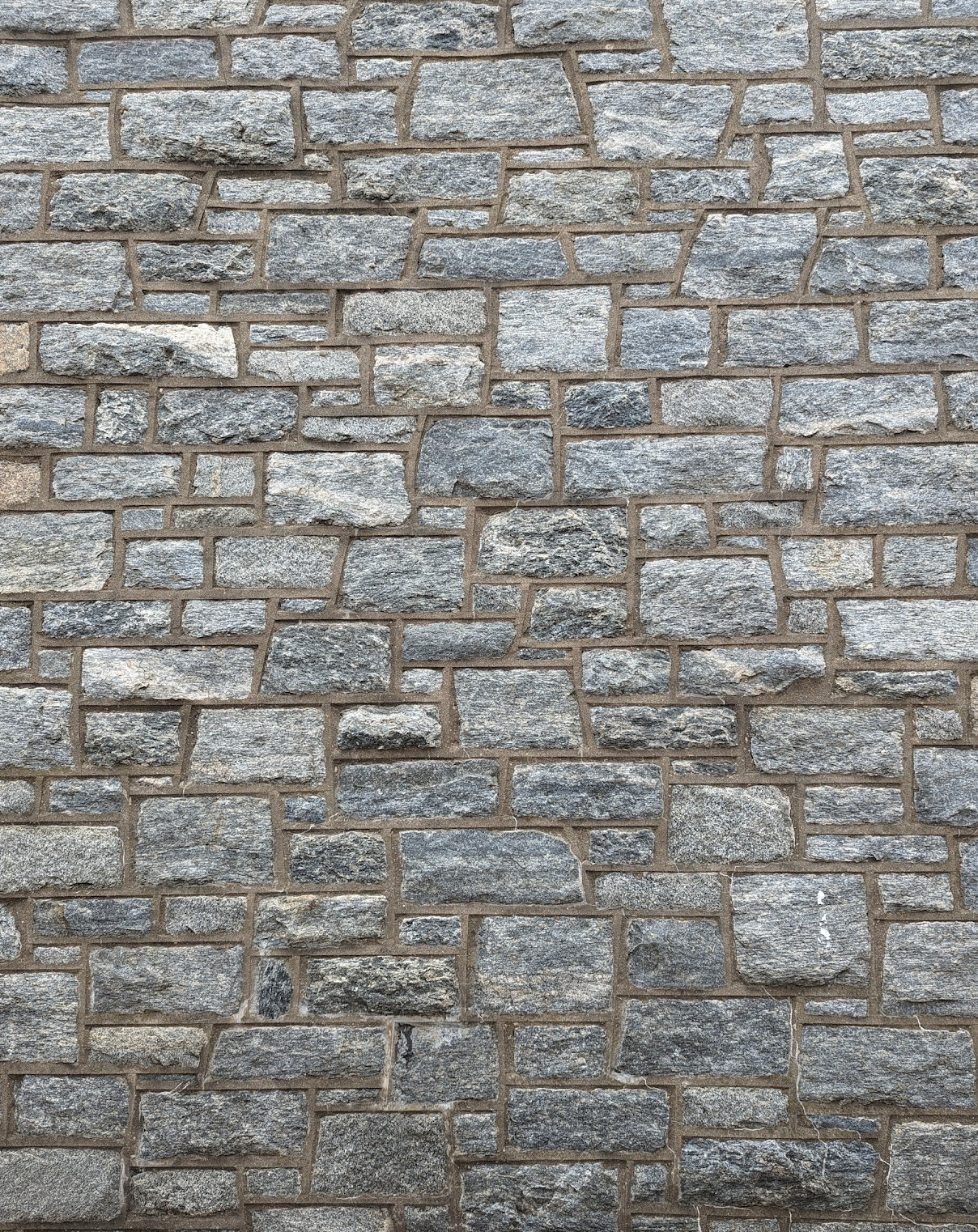
Haverford Middle School gray granite stone from Llanerch's quarry, now the Quarry Center.

Llanerch sits next to a former quarry site, now a shopping center. The quarry provided granite stone that was used in many of the pre-1930s buildings of Haverford Township and the Main Line, including the Haverford Middle School. Many Llanerch homes, both of its churches, and the former Llanerch School, are built in this stone, sometimes referred to as Wissahickon schist. In 1981, a civic group called RAG (Residents Against Garbage) was formed in Llanerch to protest turning the abandoned quarry - a site of 32 acres of which 22 was a hole at its deepest point 300 feet - to a sanitary landfill, citing the present issue of "rats as big as cats". RAG distributed 5,000 flyers and drew more than 200 people to a meeting in opposition to the landfill plan. The quarry was a persistent eyesore and liability for the Township, including the site of a small airplane crash, until its fill and conversion to a shopping center in the 2010s.

== Services ==
Llanerch is served by the Haverford Township Police Department, the Haverford Township School District, and the Llanerch Volunteer Fire Company. The current Llanerch Fire Company building is the site of the former early 20th century Llanerch grocery store. The former Llanerch School in Llanerch, built in 1913, served the neighborhood until 1977. It has been repurposed and converted to apartments. The Pennsy trail, a rails-to-trails project, was extended to Llanerch in 2024, connecting it to Brookline and Oakmont. The community's nearest train station is the M Line Township Line Road station.

== Demographics ==
As of the 2020 census, there were 1,162 people. The median age was 38.7 years. The racial makeup of Llanerch was 83.8% white, 6.7% African American, 0.2% American Indian and Alaska Native, 3.9% Asian, and 4.9% from two or more races. 22.5% of the population of Llanerch was under 18. The average family size was 3.3. There were 449 households of which 85% were families.

The population density was 6,916 inhabitants per square mile as of the 2020 census. There were 464 total housing units.

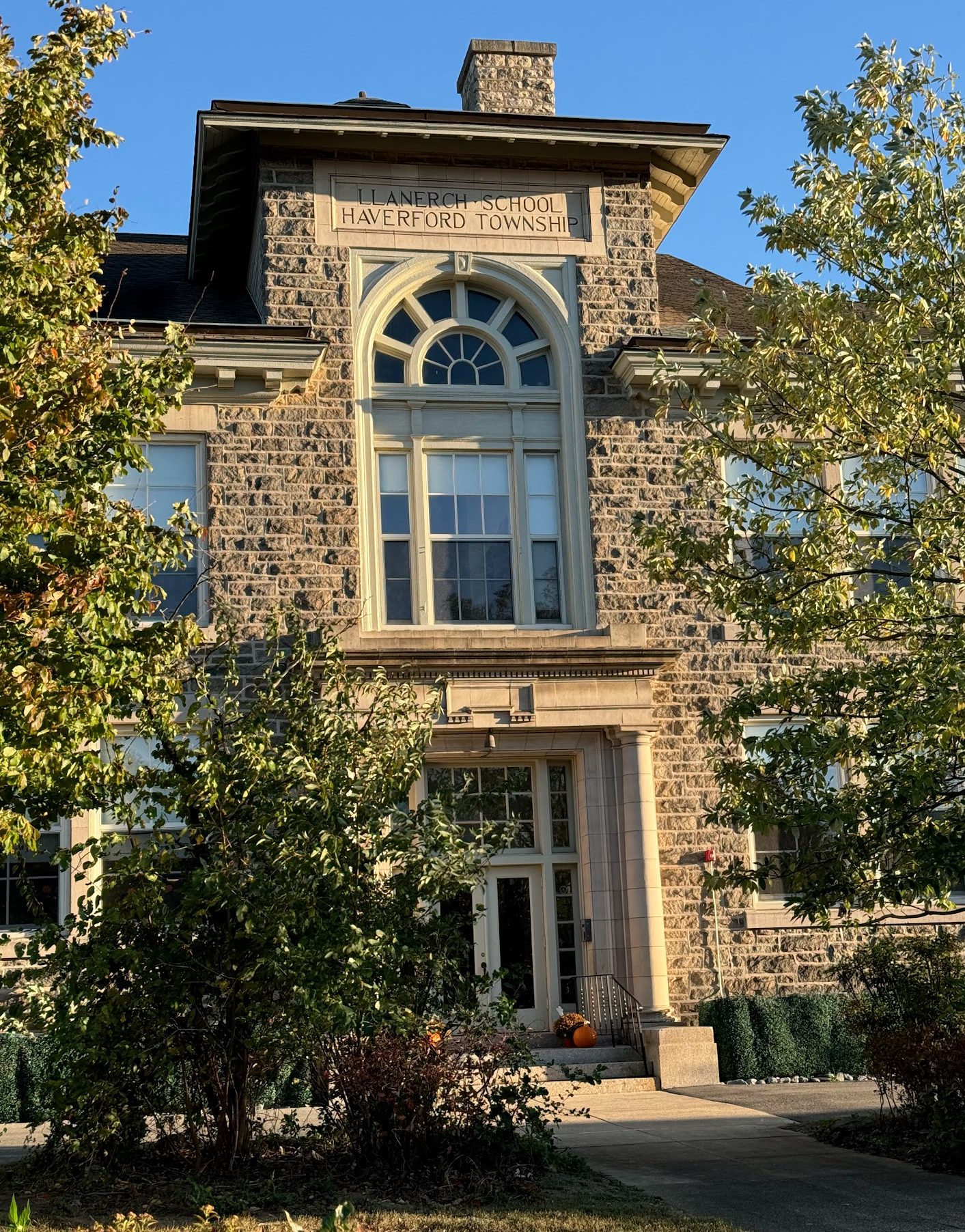
Former Llanerch School, built in 1913

The age distribution was 22.3% under the age of 18, 7.8% from 18 to 24, 15.6% from 25 to 34, 14.2% from 35 to 44, 23.4% from 45 to 64, and 9.8% who were 65 years of age or older. The median age was approximately 40 years. For every 100 females, there were 100.3 males.

Indicated in the 2022 American Community Survey, 59.7% of the population 25 years and older had a bachelor's degree or higher level of education. The median household income was $126,250. The median family income was $147,361.

== Religion ==
The community is home to the historic Llanerch Presbyterian Church, built in 1912, and the former St. Andrew's Methodist Episcopalian Church, built in 1898, no longer in use for worship.

== In popular culture ==
Several scenes from the movie Silver Linings Playbook were shot in Llanerch, such as The Llanerch Diner, located on U.S. Route 1, where the diner scene was shot.

== Notable residents ==
- Amos Strunk, baseball player
- Catherine Littlefield, ballerina
