= Penfield, Haverford Township, Pennsylvania =

Penfield, Pennsylvania
- Unincorporated community
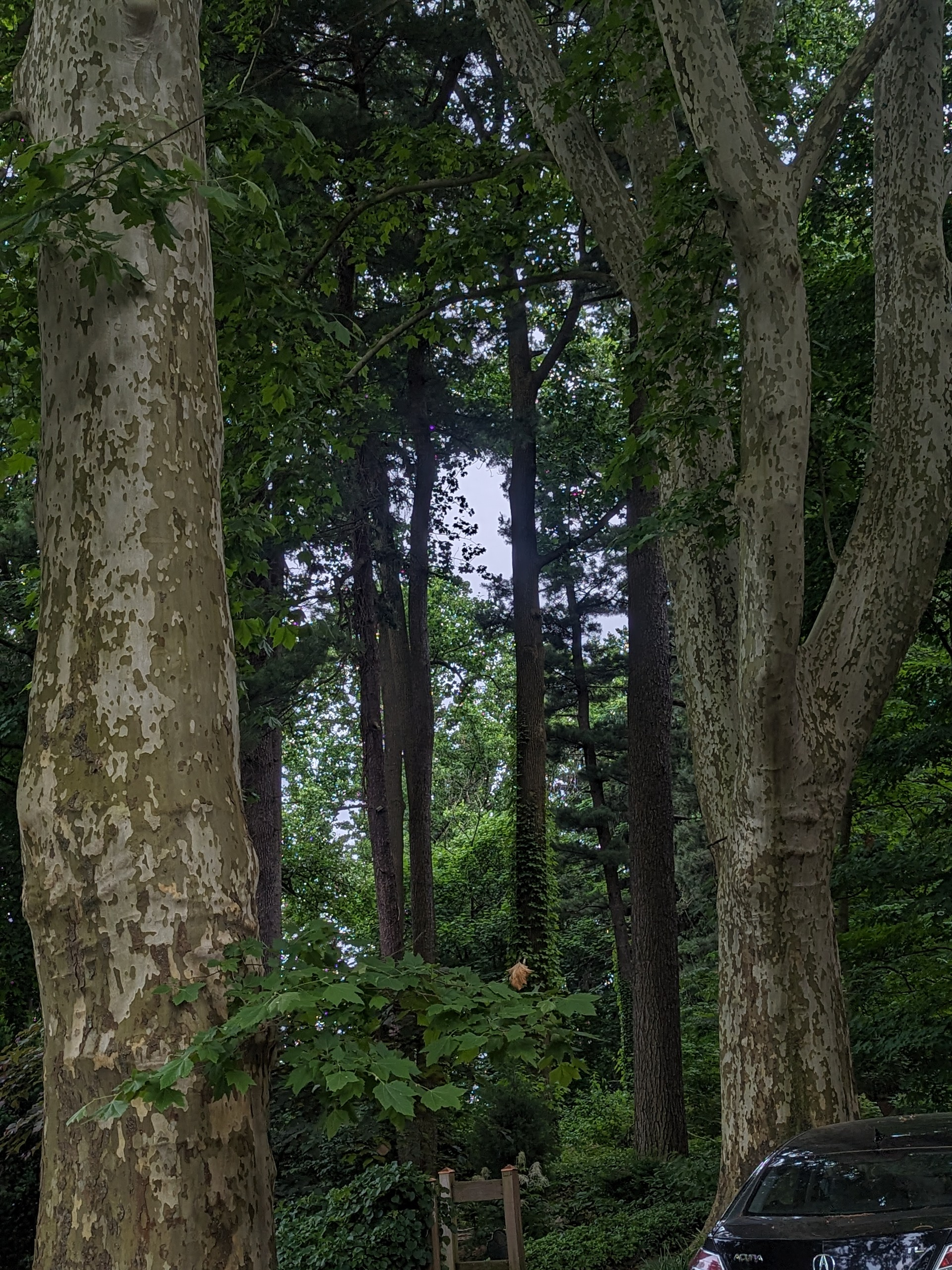
- A view of the Grange Estate woods from Penfield at the end of Grove Place

- Location within Pennsylvania Location within the United States
- Coordinates: 39°58′58″N 75°17′18″W
- Country: United States
- State: Pennsylvania
- County: Delaware
- Township: Haverford
- Elevation: 278 ft (85 m)

Population
  - Total: 1,519
- Time zone: UTC-5 (Eastern (EST))
  - Summer (DST): UTC-4 (EDT)
- Area codes: 610 and 484
- GNIS feature ID: 1183464

Penfield is an unincorporated community in Haverford Township in Delaware County, Pennsylvania, United States. Penfield borders the unincorporated communities of Brookline, Chatham Park, Carroll Park, and Beechwood in Haverford.

== History ==
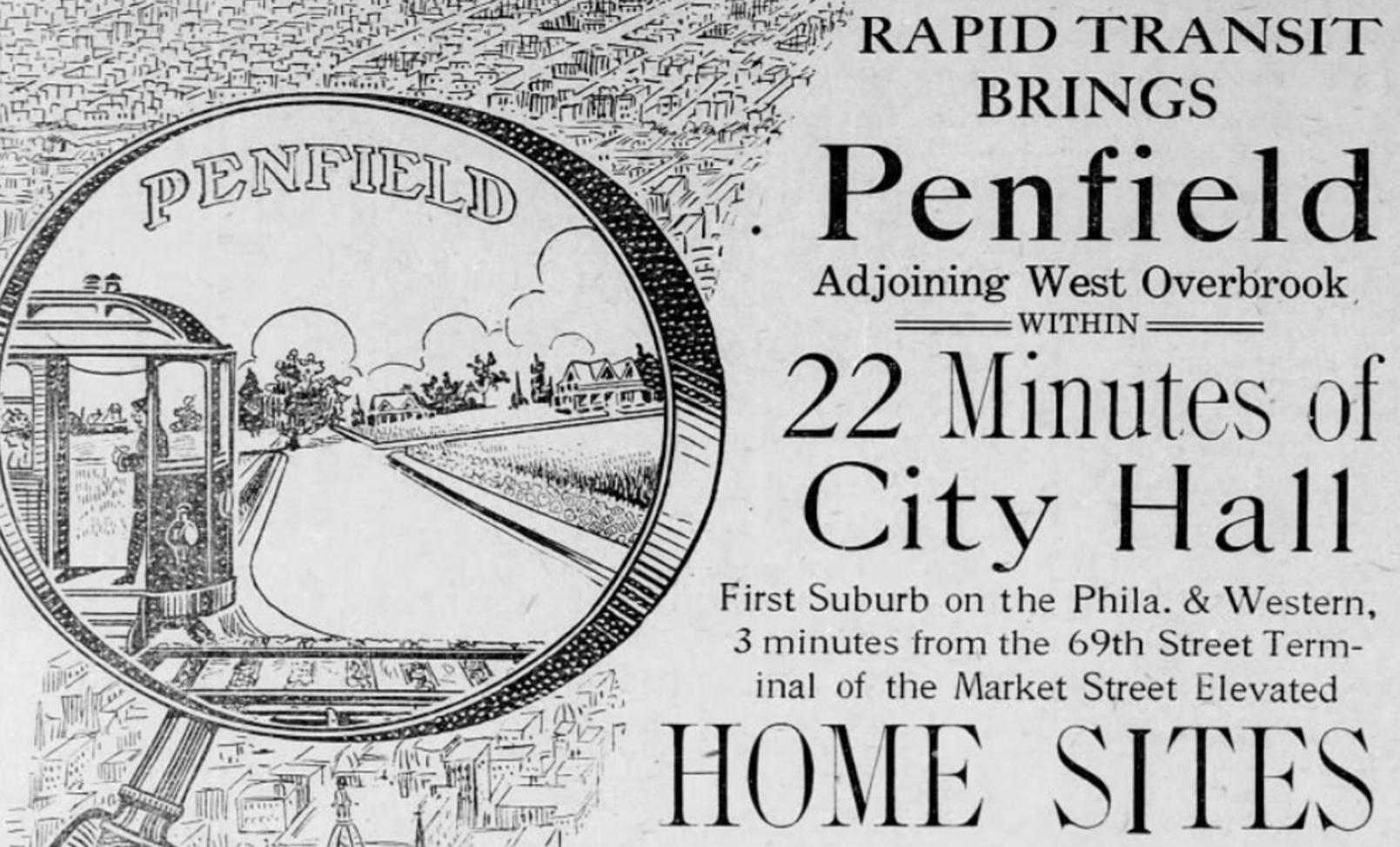
Philadelphia Inquirer advertisement for Penfield, highlighting the train service

The farming land that would be developed into Penfield was originally owned by Clifford Burke Harmon. The Penfield development coincided with the farmlands of Henry C. Terry, shortly before sale of the land around 1900.

The development of Penfield began to be planned in 1907 when the Philadelphia and Western train brought service from 69th street to Norristown. The proximity of Penfield to the city of Philadelphia was a selling point for the budding suburb. The reliance on the P&W rapid transit line and the development of Penfield around it make it an early 19th century example of a streetcar suburb, one of several in the Western Suburbs of Philadelphia. The development of Penfield, including its sidewalks, roads, gutters and landscaping, was undertaken by Clifford B. Harmon & Company. Clifford B. Harmon was a wealthy real estate developer and aviator, founding the International League of Aviators. The development of Penfield was well underway by 1910.

Penfield is located right next to the Grange Estate, Lawrence Cabin, and Nitre Hall. All three notable historic properties are in the Karakung Valley, also known as Powder Mill Valley.

Penfield is served by the Haverford Township School District, Haverford Township Police Department, and the Brookline Fire Station. Its nearest transit stop is Penfield Station on the M Line.

== Demographics ==
The population of Penfield was 1,519 as of the 2020 census.
