= Oakmont, Haverford Township, Pennsylvania =

Unincorporated community in Pennsylvania, US

Oakmont, Pennsylvania
- Unincorporated community
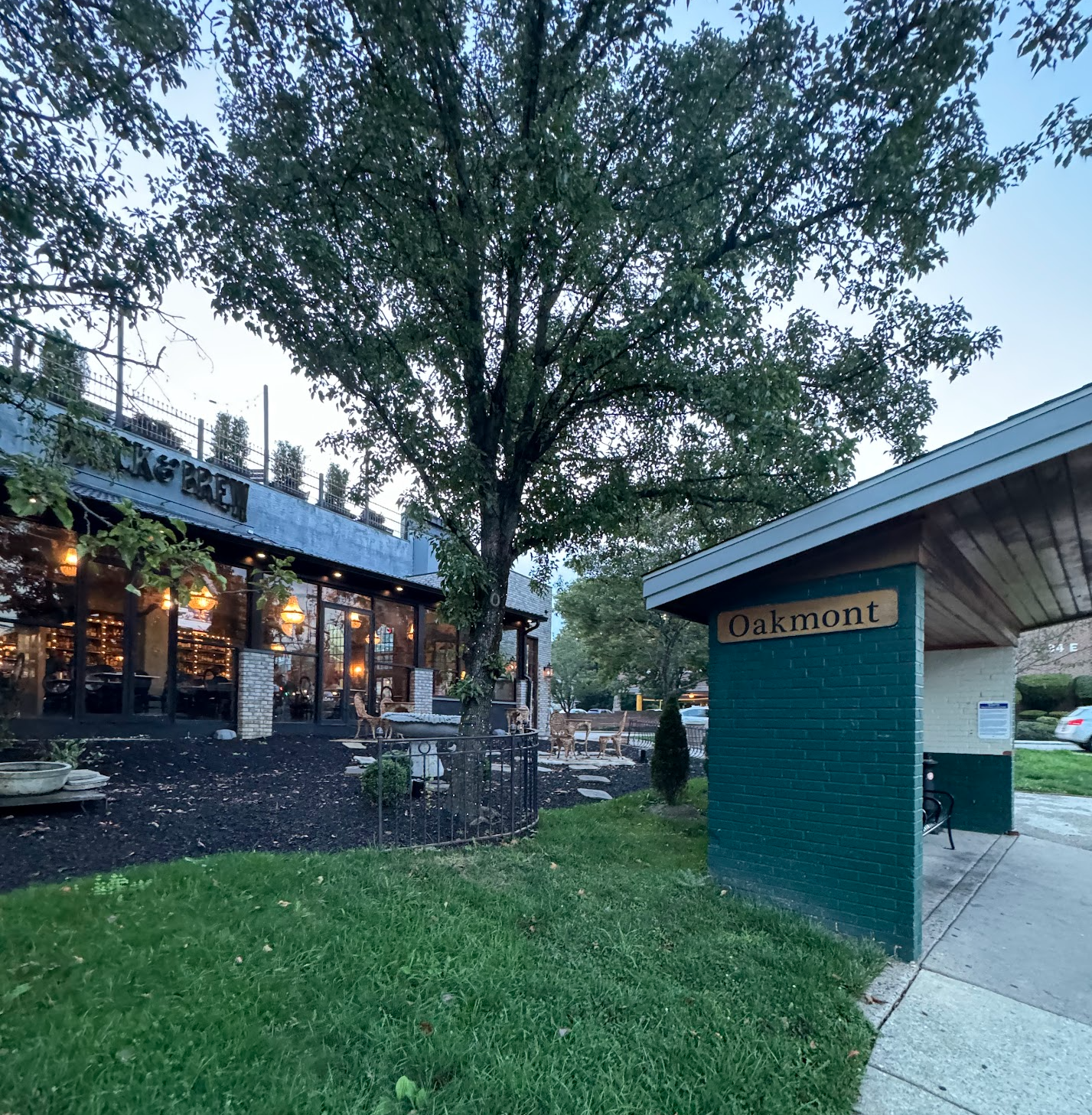
- The corner of Eagle Road and Darby Road in Oakmont

- Location within Pennsylvania Location within the United States
- Country: United States
- State: Pennsylvania
- County: Delaware
- Township: Haverford
- Elevation: 337 ft (103 m)

Population
  - Total: 4,569
- Time zone: UTC-5 (Eastern (EST))
  - Summer (DST): UTC-4 (EDT)
- Area codes: 610 and 484
- GNIS feature ID: 1182842

Oakmont is an unincorporated community in Haverford Township in Delaware County, Pennsylvania, United States. The Oakmont neighborhood is generally bounded by Campbell Avenue, Winton Avenue, East Marthart Avenue and Darby Road. It borders the unincorporated communities of Merion Golf Manor, Merwood, Paddock Farms, Woodmere Park, Brookline, Lynnewood, and Manoa. Oakmont, alongside Brookline, is considered the heart or town center of Haverford.

== History ==
Eagle Road cuts across Oakmont from West to East. The road that would become Eagle Road was initially laid around 1696 for the Old Haverford Friends Meetinghouse, built 1688. Oakmont is also the site of Saint Denis Church, founded in 1825 for mill workers in Kellyville in the Karakung Creek Valley mills. Early 19th century lotting and development maps of the neighborhood refer to Oakmont as 'South Ardmore' and 'Grassland'. Oakmont was commonly used to refer to the area, as indicated in the 1961 property atlas of the Main Line, the name of the Oakmont Station, and early advertisements for the neighborhood.

The Oakmont neighborhood was developed by the same firm that planned the earlier Brookline neighborhood (1907), A. E. Mueller and Co in the 1920s. The developers advertised Oakmont as a commuting suburb of Philadelphia, highlighting Oakmont's location on Darby Road with the Ardmore Line, making it an early 20th century example of a streetcar suburb.

The commercial development of Oakmont is oriented toward historic trolley service, particularly along Darby Road and along Eagle Road between East and West Darby Road. While Oakmont is no longer anchored by trolley stations, the development pattern persists. Today, a covered bus stop remains for riders of SEPTA bus route 103, running along the former trolley route to Ardmore. Oakmont connects to Haverford Road and Ardmore by the SEPTA private busway for the 103 bus route, originally right-of-way for the trolley rails. It is the first private busway in the United States.

The Newtown Square Branch railway line once extended through Oakmont as well. It was cut in 1963 to terminate in Oakmont and abandoned in 1981. The previous right-of-way of the train stood empty for decades until its conversion into the Pennsy Trail, a rails-to-trails project part of the Delaware Valley’s circuit trails system that connects Oakmont to Brookline and Llanerch.

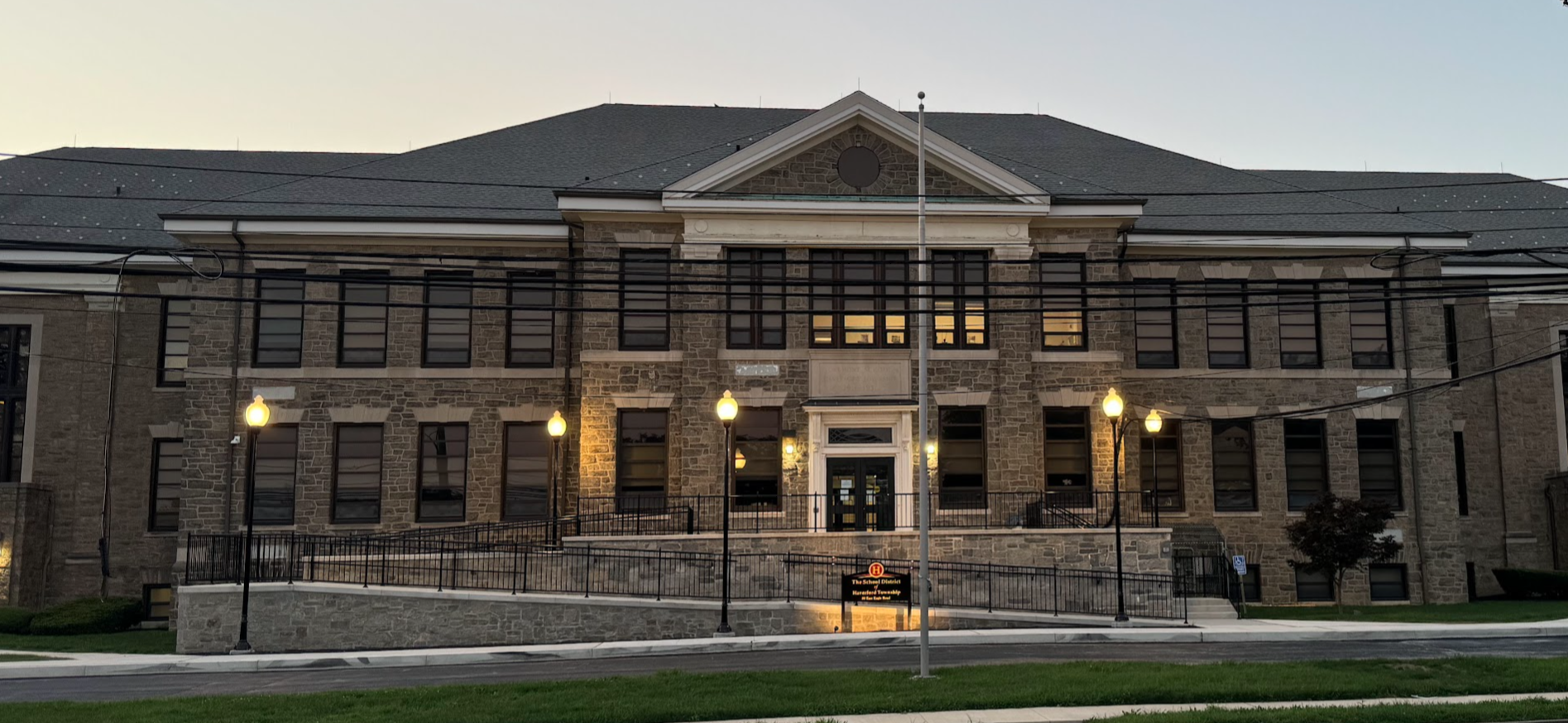
The Old Oakmont School

Oakmont is served by the Haverford Township School District, the Oakmont Fire Company (established 1912), and the Haverford Township Police Department. The neighborhood was once served by the Oakmont School as an elementary school. It now houses the administration of the Haverford Township School District. The Oakmont Farmer's Market is held at Grace Chapel and is part of the Pennsylvania Association for Sustainable Agriculture. Its served by both the Ardmore Junction and Wynnewood stations.

== Demographics ==
Oakmont corresponds to Census Block Groups 2 and 3 in Census Tract 4086, Census Block Group 2 in Census Tract 4087, and Census Block Group 2 in Census Tract 4091. As of the 2020 census, these areas had a combined population of 4,569.

== Gallery ==
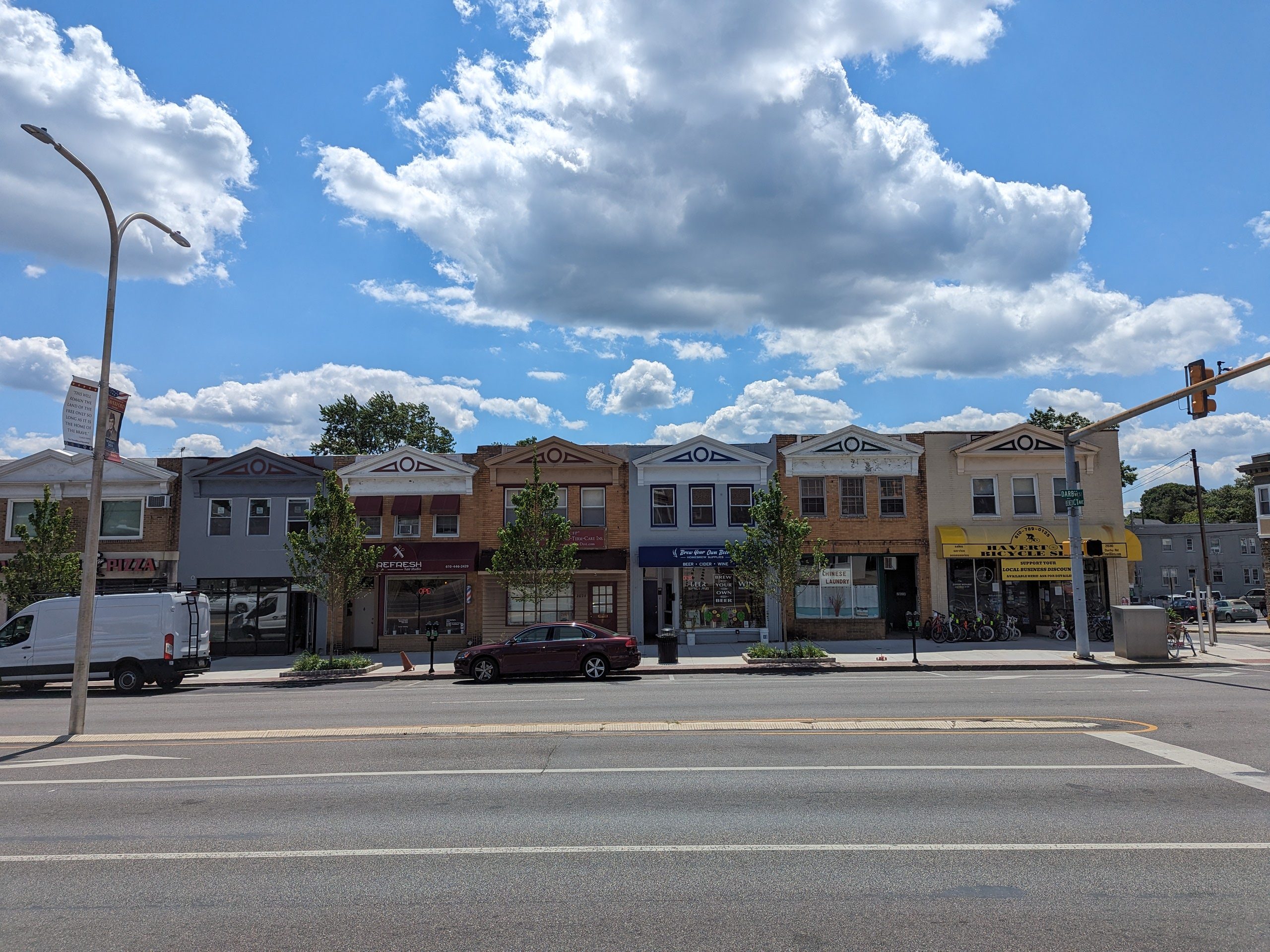
Shops on Darby Road

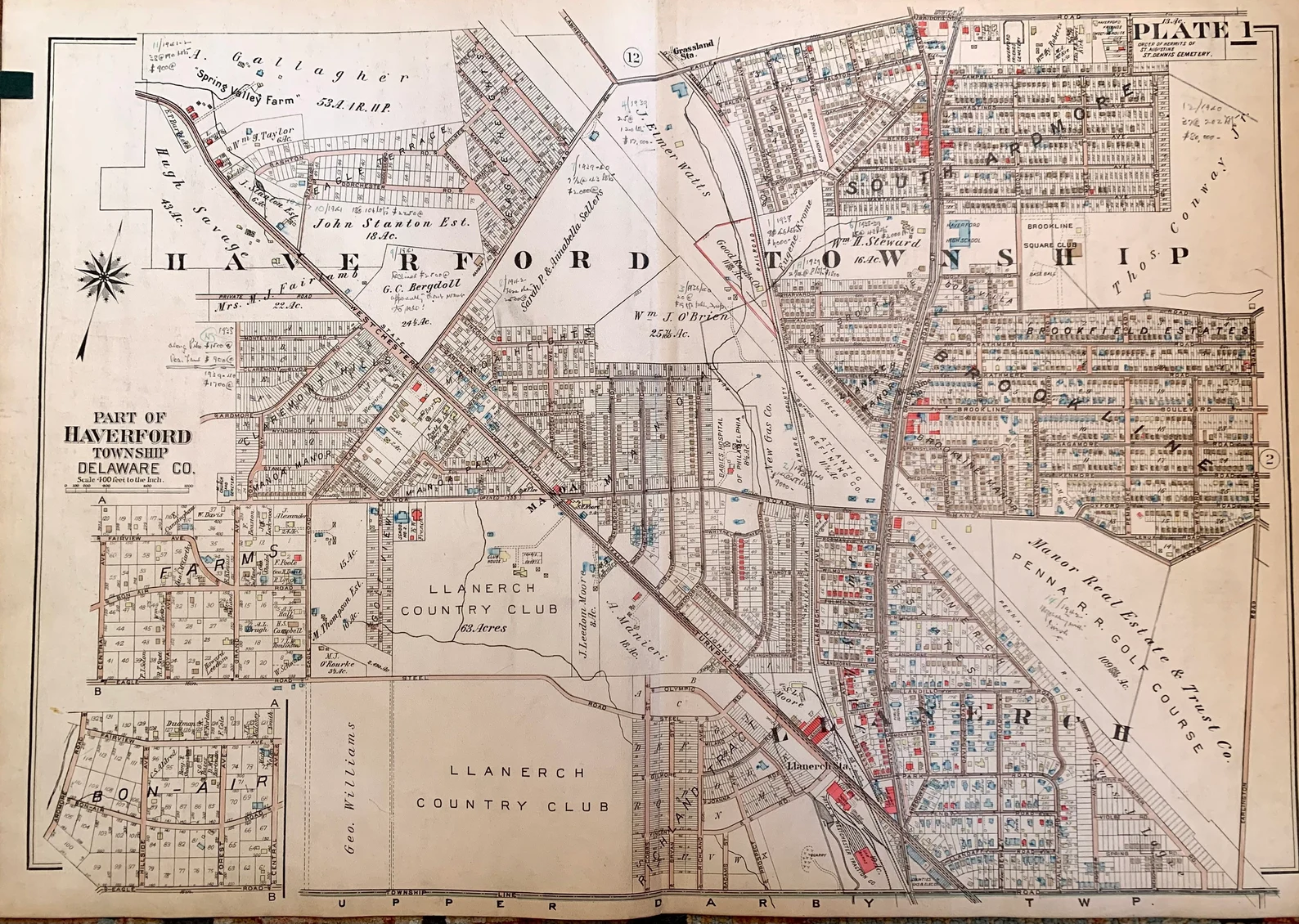
Oakmont was occasionally referred to as South Ardmore and Grassland

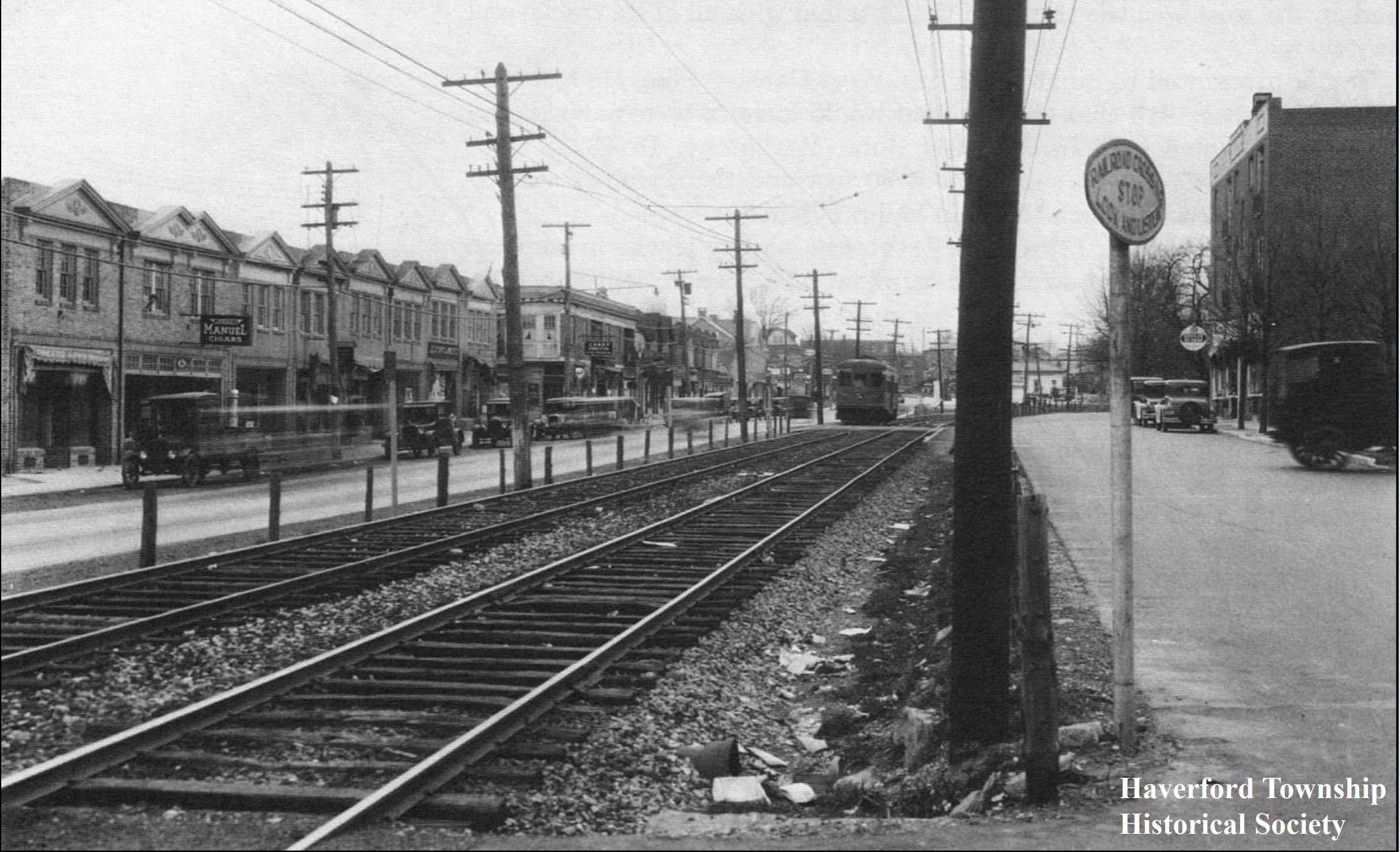
The former trolley route through Oakmont

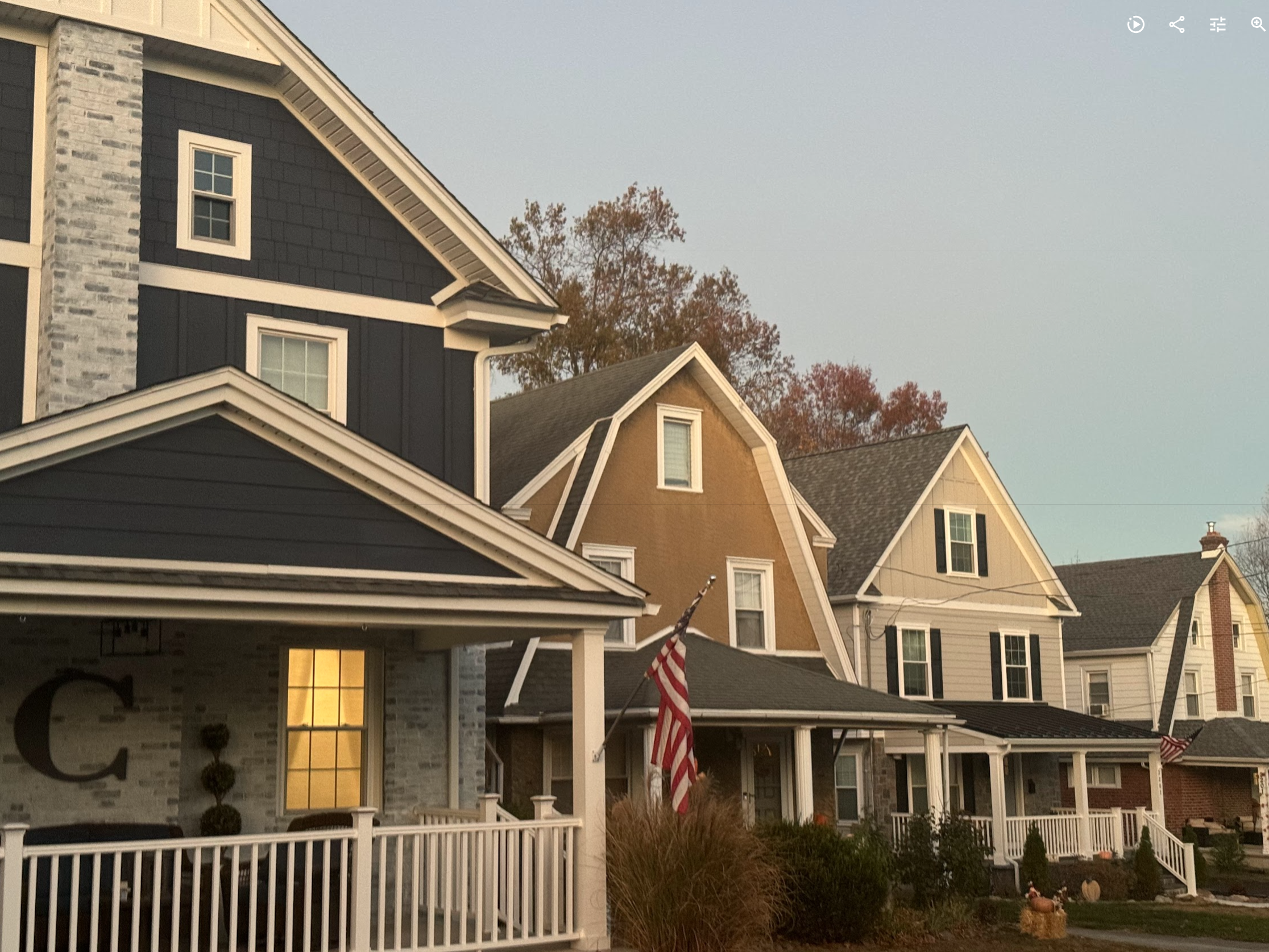
Homes in the Grassland section of Oakmont
