= Penfield station (SEPTA) =

Rapid transit station in Pennsylvania

Penfield
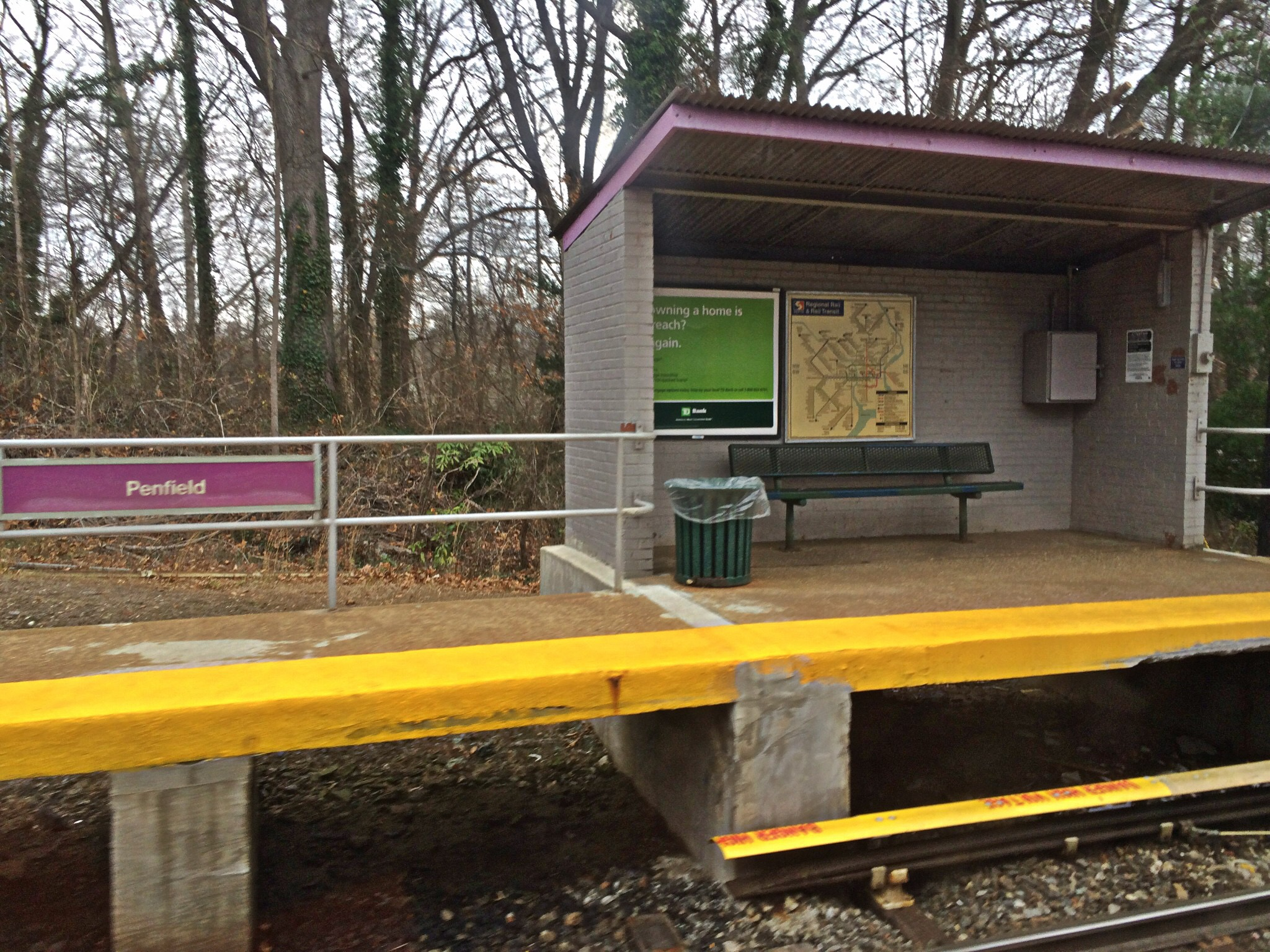
- Penfield station platform

General information
- Location: Manoa Road & Lawson Avenue; Haverford Township, Pennsylvania
- Coordinates: 39°58′51″N 75°17′02″W
- Owner: SEPTA
- Platforms: 2 side platforms
- Tracks: 2

Construction
- Accessible: No

Services
Preceding station	SEPTA Metro	Following station
Beechwood–Brookline toward Norristown T.C.	M (SEPTA Metro)	Township Line Road toward 69th Street T.C.
Former services
Preceding station	Lehigh Valley Transit Company	Following station
Beechwood-Brookline toward Allentown	Liberty Bell High Speed Line Until 1951	West Overbrook toward 69th Street
Preceding station	Philadelphia and Western Railroad	Following station
Beechwood-Brookline toward Strafford	Strafford Branch Until 1956	West Overbrook toward 69th Street
Location

Penfield station is a SEPTA Metro rapid transit station in Haverford Township, Pennsylvania. It serves the M and is located at Manoa Road and Lawson Avenue in Penfield. All trains stop at Penfield. The station lies 1.9 track miles (3.1 km) from 69th Street Transit Center.

The land use around the station is primarily single family residential. It is the second busiest station in Haverford Township, after Ardmore Junction. The Forge-to-Refuge Circuit Trail passes by the station. The station has 64 unofficial parking spots, with 48% of commuters parking at the station within a mile of their homes. The station lacks crosswalks and some sidewalks on nearby roads and has limited ADA accessibility and bike infrastructure.

The station was pivotal in the development of the early 20th century streetcar suburb of Penfield. It is within the Powder Mill Valley, which contains the historic sites of Nitre Hall and Lawrence Cabin.
