= Parkview station =

Rapid transit station in Philadelphia

Parkview
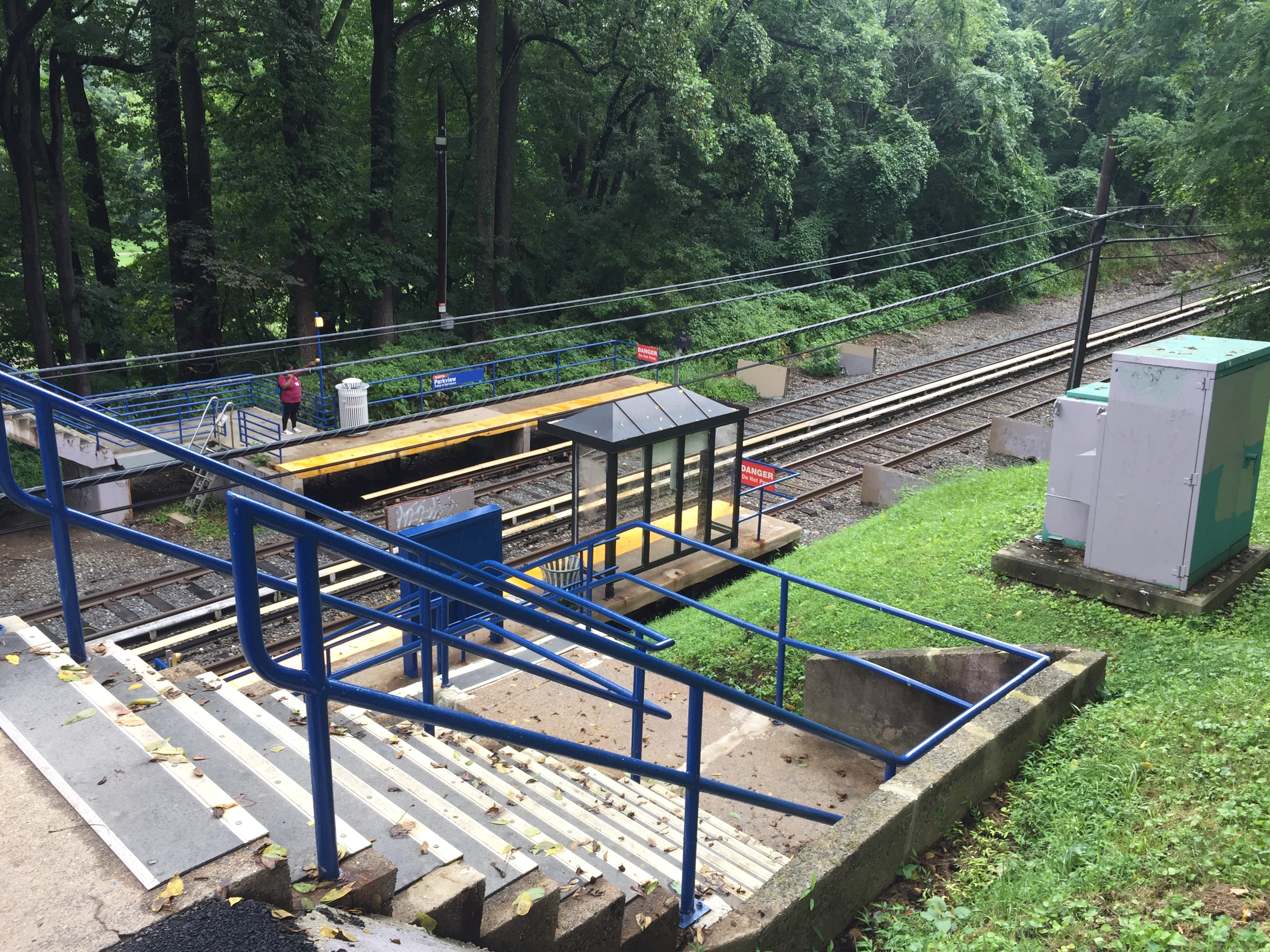
- Parkview station in August 2018

General information
- Location: Parkview Road and Pennock Road; Upper Darby Township, Pennsylvania
- Coordinates: 39.9687°N 75.2743°W
- Owner: SEPTA
- Platforms: 2 side platforms
- Tracks: 2

Construction
- Accessible: No

Services
Preceding station	SEPTA Metro	Following station
Township Line Road toward Norristown T.C.	M (SEPTA Metro)	69th Street T.C. Terminus
Former services
Preceding station	Philadelphia and Western Railroad	Following station
West Overbrook toward Strafford	Strafford Branch Until 1956	69th Street Terminus
Location

Parkview station is a SEPTA Metro rapid transit located in the Highland Park section of Upper Darby Township, Pennsylvania. It serves the M. The station is located under a footbridge with access from Parkview Road at Pennock Road.

The station was opened in 1953 by the Philadelphia and Western Railroad as replacement for a bus route discontinued by the Philadelphia Suburban Transportation Company. The footbridge was replaced in the late 1980s. In 1987, it was the least-used station on the line, with just 15 daily boardings.
