= Township Line Road station =

Rapid transit station in Pennsylvania

Township Line Rd
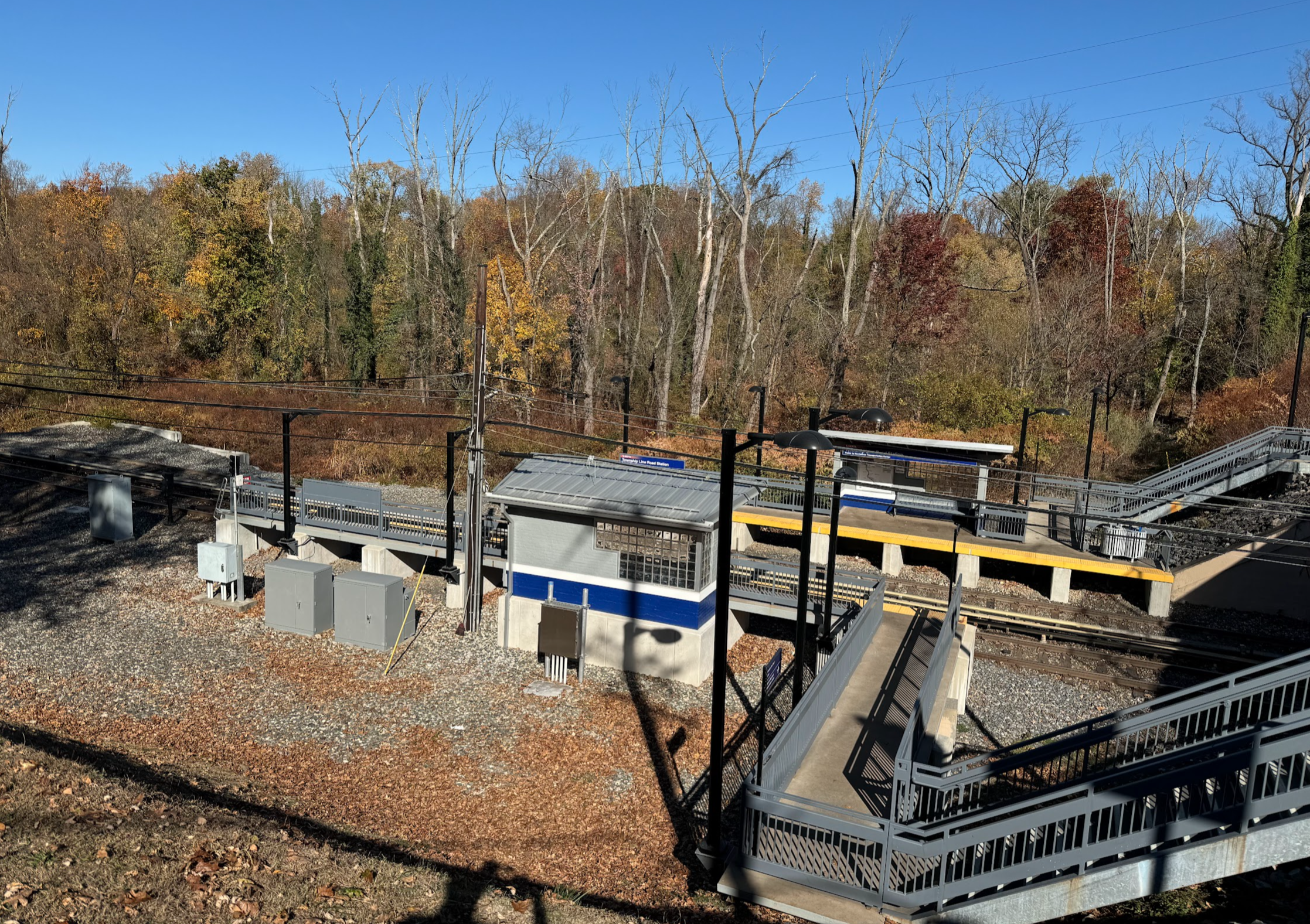
- Township Line Road station platform

General information
- Location: Township Line Road and Grove Place; Haverford Township, Pennsylvania
- Coordinates: 39°58′29″N 75°16′53″W
- Owner: SEPTA
- Platforms: 2 side platforms
- Tracks: 2
- Connections: SEPTA Suburban Bus: 103

Construction
- Structure type: Below-grade
- Accessible: No

History
- Former names: West Overbrook (–2010)

Services
Preceding station	SEPTA Metro	Following station
Penfield toward Norristown T.C.	M (SEPTA Metro)	Parkview toward 69th Street T.C.
Former services
Preceding station	Lehigh Valley Transit Company	Following station
Penfield toward Allentown	Liberty Bell High Speed Line Until 1951	Parkview toward 69th Street
Preceding station	Philadelphia and Western Railroad	Following station
Penfield toward Strafford	Strafford Branch Until 1956	Parkview toward 69th Street
Location

Township Line Road station is a SEPTA Metro rapid transit station in Haverford Township, Pennsylvania. It serves the M and is located at Township Line Road (U.S. Route 1) and Grove Place, although SEPTA gives the address as being at City and Grove Place. Only local trains stop at Township Line Road. The station lies 1.4 track miles (2.3 km) from 69th Street Terminal. Bus stops for Routes 103 and 31 are located within walking distance of Township Line Road Station.

The station primarily serves the neighborhoods of Chatham and Carroll Park in Haverford Township. It is surrounded on its south and eastern sides by Cobbs Creek Park, part of the Fairmount Park system. It also borders the McCall Golf Club, the Grange Estate, and the currently under construction Cobbs Creek Golf Club. The station is located 20 feet below grade, stepping down from Township Line Road. Of the seven stations in Haverford along the M, this station has the fewest boardings in the Township. The current land use around the station is largely single family residential. In a study of the conditions of M Line Haverford stations, the station stood out as lacking amenities such as parking, pedestrian refuges, improved sidewalk conditions, bike infrastructure, clear signage, and crosswalks. The Forge-to-Refuge circuit trail and Cobbs Creek also runs parallel to the tracks, passing closely by the station.
