= Wynnewood Road station =

Rapid transit station in Pennsylvania

Wynnewood Rd
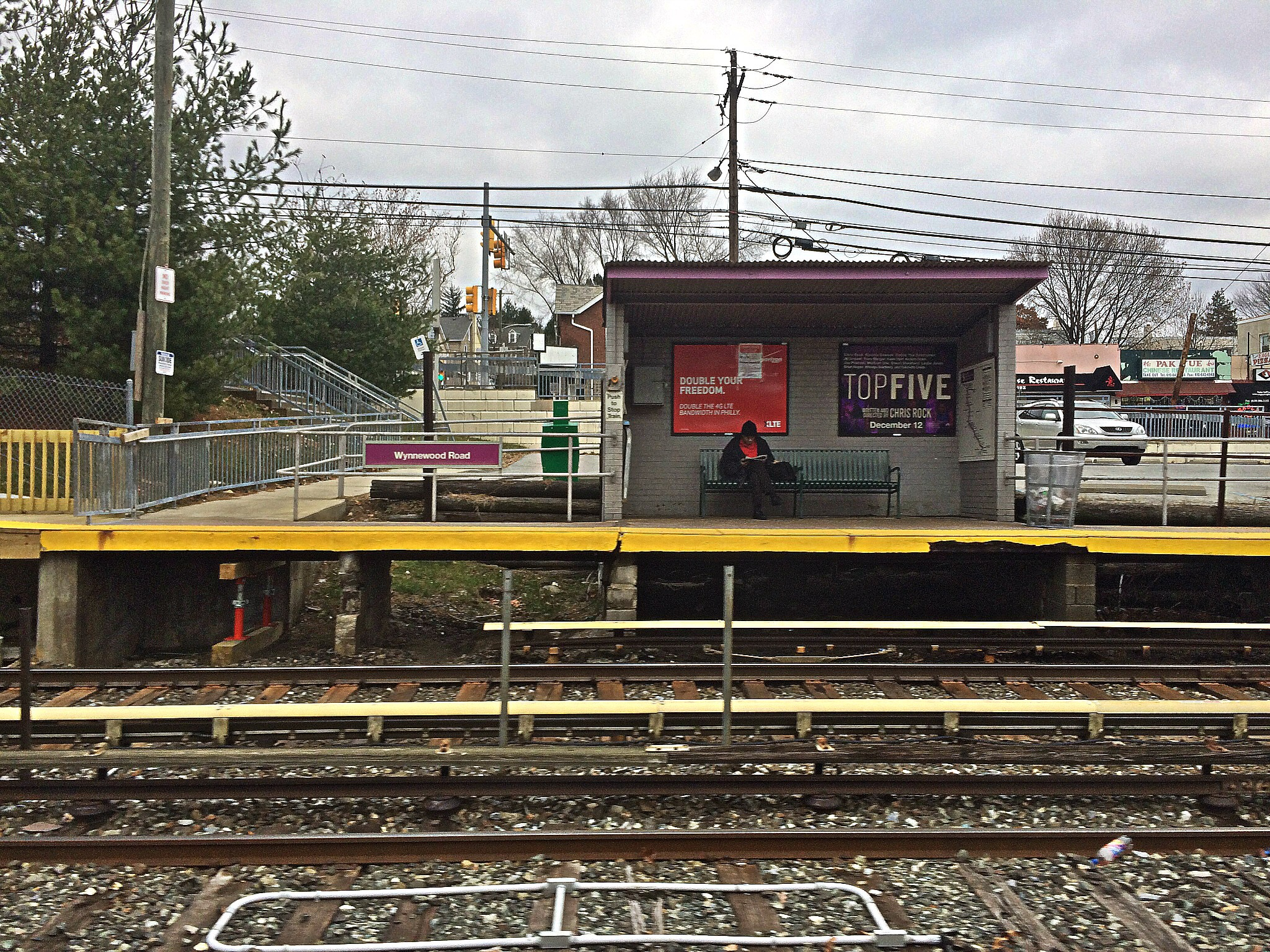

General information
- Location: Wynnewood and Haverford Roads; Haverford Township, Pennsylvania.
- Coordinates: 39.9933°N 75.2984°W
- Owner: SEPTA
- Platforms: 2 side platforms
- Tracks: 3

Construction
- Parking: Yes
- Accessible: Yes

History
- Electrified: Third rail

Services
Preceding station	SEPTA Metro	Following station
Ardmore Junction toward Norristown T.C.	M (SEPTA Metro)	Beechwood–Brookline toward 69th Street T.C.
Former services
Preceding station	Lehigh Valley Transit Company	Following station
Ardmore Junction toward Allentown	Liberty Bell High Speed Line Until 1951	Beechwood–Brookline toward 69th Street
Preceding station	Philadelphia and Western Railroad	Following station
Ardmore Junction toward Strafford	Strafford Branch Until 1956	Beechwood–Brookline toward 69th Street
Location

Wynnewood Road station is a SEPTA Metro rapid transit station in Haverford Township, Pennsylvania. It serves the M and is located at Eagle and Haverford Roads. All trains stop at Wynnewood Road. The station lies 3.1 track miles (5.0 km) from 69th Street Transit Center. The station has off-street parking and an accessible platform. Wynnewood station and Ardmore Junction are key anchors of the Haverford Road Corridor.

The station serves the neighborhoods of Ardmore Park, Merwood, and Woodmere Park in Haverford Township. The land use around the station is predominately residential with some commercial and mixed uses. There are no bicycle facilities at the station. It is ADA accessible. There are 32 SEPTA parking spaces.
