= Llanerch Public School =

Former school in Havertown, Pennsylvania

- U.S. National Register of Historic Places
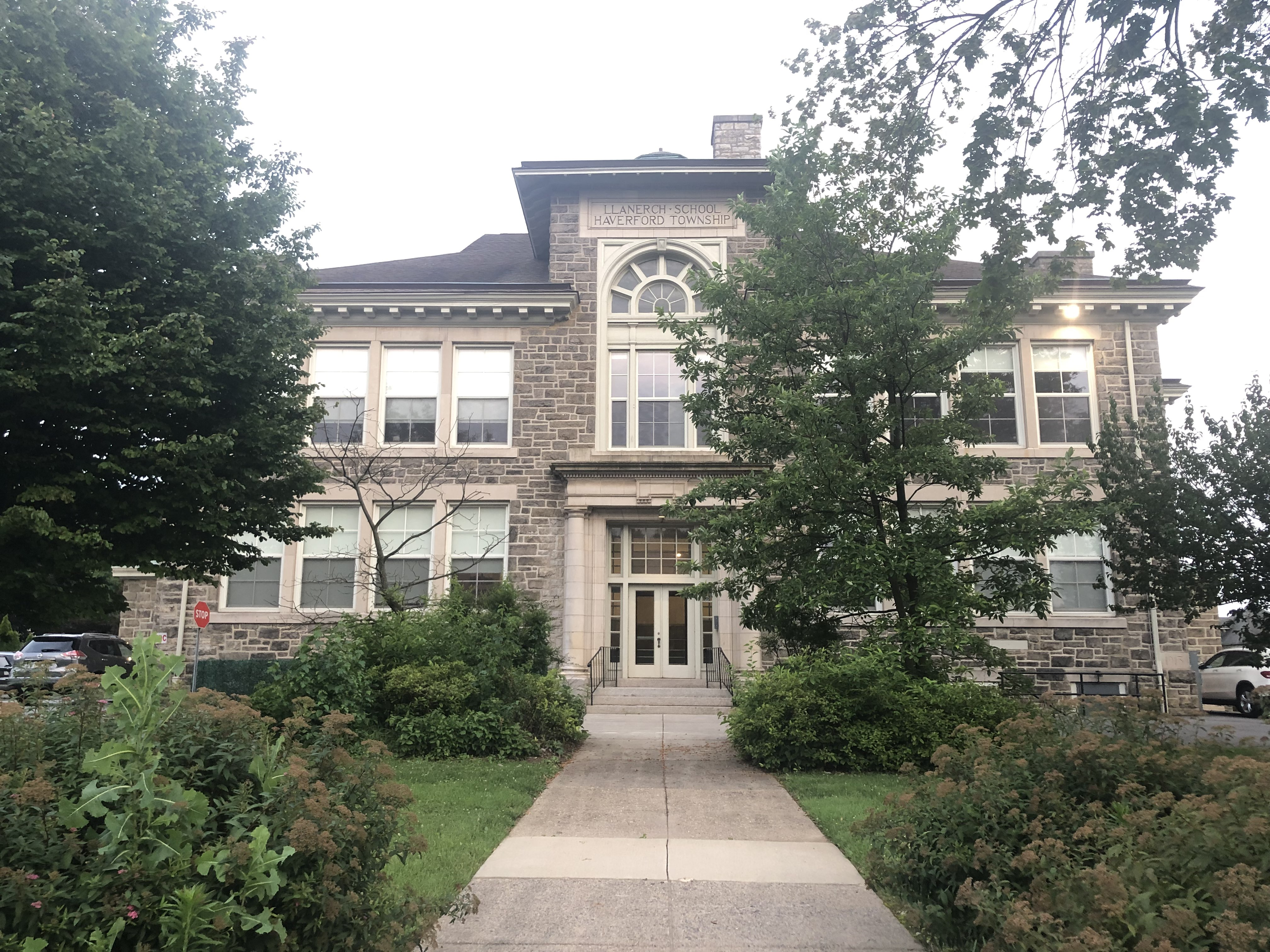

- Location within Pennsylvania
- Location: 5 Llandillo Road; Havertown, Pennsylvania; 19083
- Coordinates: 39.972037°N 75.299444°W
- Built: 1913
- Architectural style: Colonial Revival; Georgian Revival
- Website: llanerchschoolapts.com
- NRHP reference No.: 100000855
- Added to NRHP: February 15, 2017

Llanerch Public School, also known as Llanerch Grammar School, is a former school established in 1913 that operated in the Llanerch neighborhood of Haverford Township, Pennsylvania. It is on the National Register of Historic Places in Delaware County, Pennsylvania. It is built in the Georgian Revival architectural style. It is not to be confused with the Llanerch School that served as Haverford Township School District's high school from 1905 to 1910, which occupied the same site that the former was built on.

== History ==
The Llanerch School was built in 1913, and served as a public school for residents of Llanerch, Pennsylvania. Shortly after its opening, in 1913, Justice of the Peace William B. Cowan struck his head on a pipe and fell on his chin, resulting in his death, while trying to relight a fire for the chimney of the building for the new students and teachers, who were complaining of the cold.

The school closed in 1977 and was leased out to the Delaware County Intermediate Unit until the 1980s, remaining inoperative as a school for several years. There were calls to turn the school lot into a bus depot after the closure of the school's activities, but the idea did not come to fruition. In 1987, the Stratford Friends School briefly relocated to the area.

Protests by local residents occurred in 1986 when a developer submitted a bid to turn the building into an office complex. The protests were successful and the back lot of the school's property remains a public playground.

In 2015, the Llanerch School began a conversion from a now-defunct school to an apartment complex. As of 2021, the building has been fully converted. The apartment maintains a motif of the school in its interior by furnishing the hallways and rooms with items from the history of the school.

The school building was added to the NRHP on February 15, 2017.
