= Welsh Tract =

Portion of Pennsylvania settled by Quakers

Coordinates: 40.036389°N 75.3725°W

The Welsh Tract, also called the Welsh Barony, was a portion of the Province of Pennsylvania, a British colony in North America (today a U.S. state), settled largely by Welsh-speaking Quakers in the late 17th century. The region is located to the west of Philadelphia. The original settlers, led by John Roberts, negotiated with William Penn in 1684 to constitute the Tract as a separate county whose local government would use the Welsh language. The Barony was never formally created, but the many Welsh settlers gave their communities Welsh names that survive today. A more successful attempt at setting up a Gwladfa (Welsh-speaking colony) occurred two centuries later, in the Chubut Province of Patagonia, Argentina.

== History ==
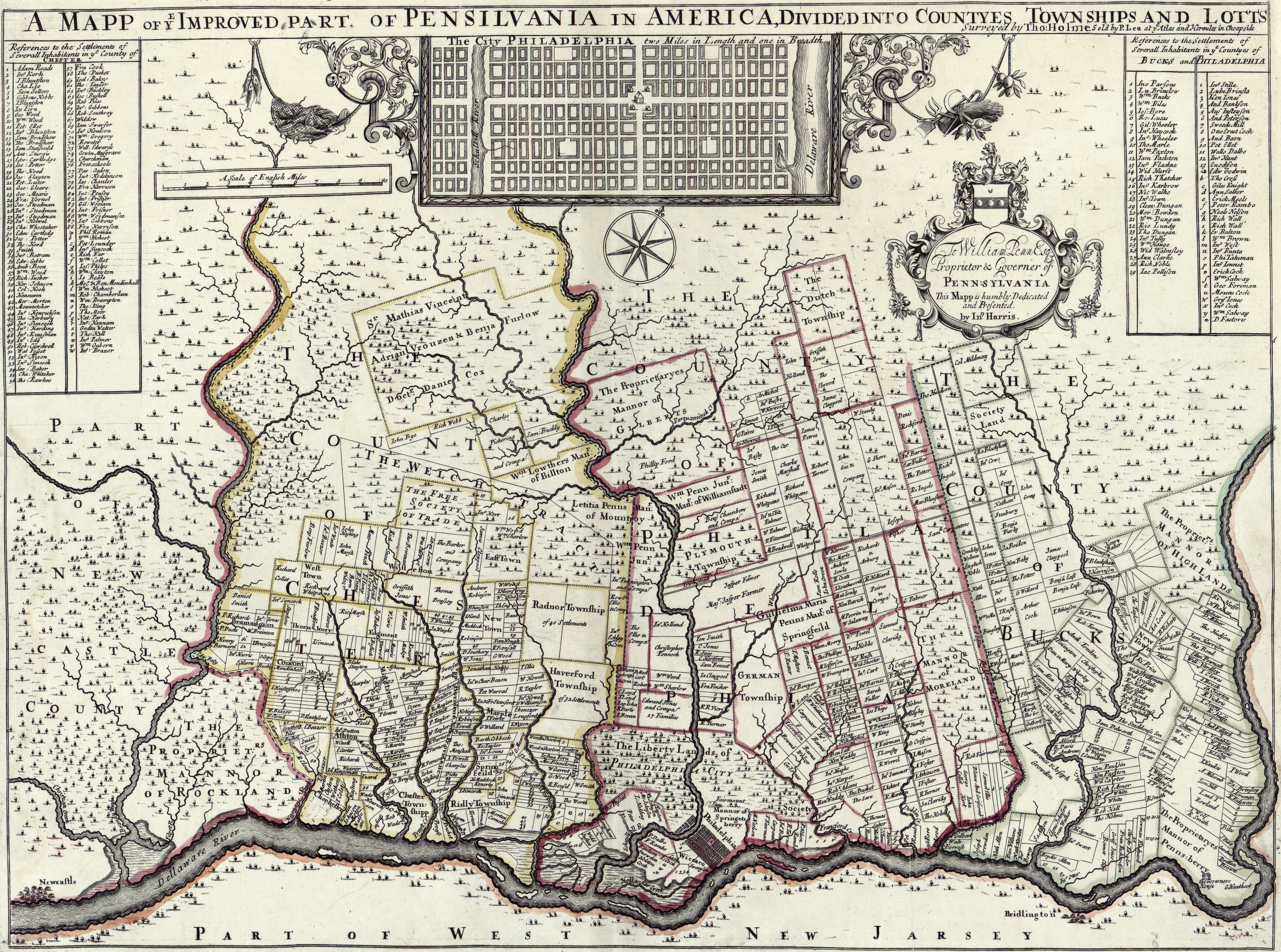
Thomas Holme's 1687 map of Pennsylvania. "The Welch Tract" appears to the left of center.

Prior to the arrival of Welsh settlers, the land of what would become the Welsh Tract was inhabited by Indigenous peoples, such as the Okehocking band of the Lenape.

In the late 17th century, there was significant Welsh immigration to Pennsylvania for religious and cultural reasons. In about 1681, a group of Welsh Quakers met with William Penn to secure a land grant to conduct their affairs in their language. The parties agreed on a tract covering 40,000 acres (160 km^{2}), to be constituted as a separate county whose people and government could conduct their affairs in Welsh.

Whereas divers considerable persons among Þ^{e} Welsh Friends have requested me Þ^{t} all Þ^{e} Lands Purchased of me by those of North Wales and South Wales, together with Þ^{e} adjacent counties to Þ^{m}, as Haverfordshire, Shropshire and Cheshire, about 40,000 acres, may be lay^{d} out contiguously as one Barony, alledging Þ^{t} Þ^{e} number allready come and suddenly to come, are such as will be capable of planting Þ^{e} same much w^{th} in Þ^{e} proportion allowed by Þ^{e} custom of Þ^{e} country, & so not lye in large useless vacancies. And because I am inclined and determined to agree and favor Þ^{m} w^{th} any reasonable Conveniency and privilede: I do hereby charge thee and strictly require thee to lay out Þ^{e} sd tract of Land in as uniform a manner as conveniently may be, upon Þ^{e} west side of Skoolkill river, running three miles upon Þ^{e} same, & two miles backward, & then extend Þ^{e} parallel w^{th} Þ^{e} river six miles and to run westwardly so far as this Þ^{e} sd quantity of land be Compleatly surveyed unto y^{ou}.—Given at Pennsbury, Þ^{e} 13th Ist mo. [March] 1684.

Whereas diverse considerable persons among the Welsh Friends have requested me that all the Lands Purchased of me by those of North Wales and South Wales, together with the adjacent counties to them, as Herefordshire, Shropshire and Cheshire, about forty-thousand acres, may be laid out contiguously as one Barony, alledging that the number already come and suddenly to come, are such as will be capable of planting the same much within the proportion allowed by the custom of the country, and so not lye in large useless vacancies. And because I am inclined and determined to agree and favor them with any reasonable Conveniency and privilege: I do hereby charge thee and strictly require thee to lay out the said tract of Land in as uniform a manner as conveniently may be, upon the west side of Schuylkill river, running three miles upon the same, and two miles backward, and then extend the parallel with the river six miles and to run westwardly so far as this the said quantity of land be Completely surveyed unto you.

— Given at Pennsbury, the 13th Ist mo. [March] 1684.

The Welsh Tract's boundaries were established in 1687, but notwithstanding the prior agreement, by the 1690s the land had already been partitioned among different counties, despite appeals from the Welsh settlers, and the Tract never gained self-government.

The Roberts and other Welsh families became influential in the area, through the building of mills and the eventual introduction of the railroad. It is the railroad that gives the best-known part of the area its current name, the Philadelphia Main Line, named after the mainline of the Pennsylvania Railroad, portions of which were absorbed into Conrail in 1976 (with Amtrak operating intercity passenger rail service from 1971, SEPTA operating commuter rail service from 1983, and Norfolk Southern acquiring Conrail's freight operations in 1997) as one of the principal rail lines running between Chicago, IL and the Eastern seaboard. After the American Civil War, 104 Welsh families from this region migrated to Knoxville, Tennessee, establishing a strong Welsh presence there.

As suburbanization spread westward from Philadelphia in the late 19th century (thanks to the railroads), living in a community with a Welsh name acquired a cachet. Some communities in the area formerly comprising the Welsh Tract were subsequently given Welsh or Welsh-sounding names to improve their perceived desirability. Among these were Gladwyne, formerly "Merion Square" (which was given its new name in 1891, although the name is meaningless in Welsh), Bryn Mawr, formerly "Humphreysville" (which was renamed in 1869), and Llanerch called so as early as 1867 meaning “Open Space” in Welsh.

== Today ==
The area is now part of Montgomery, Chester, and Delaware counties. Many towns in the area still bear Welsh names. Some, such as North Wales, Lower Gwynedd, Upper Gwynedd, Lower Merion, Upper Merion, Narberth, Bala Cynwyd, Radnor, Berwyn, and Haverford Township, are named after places in Wales. Others, such as Tredyffrin and Uwchlan have independent Welsh names.

A second "Welsh Tract" of 30,000 acres (120 km^{2}) was granted to Welsh emigrants by William Penn in 1701. It made up the modern Pencader Hundred, Delaware, and some of Cecil County, Maryland.

== See also ==
- Cambria, Pennsylvania
- Churchtown, Pennsylvania, settled by Welsh adherents of the Church of England
- History of Pennsylvania
- Welsh American
