= School District of Haverford Township =

School district in Pennsylvania, United States

Address
- 50 East Eagle Road Havertown, Pennsylvania, 19083; United States
- Coordinates: 39.98803°N 75.30612°W

District information
- Type: Public
- Grades: K–12
- NCES District ID: 4211670

Students and staff
- Students: 6,563 (2020–2021)
- Teachers: 430.25 (on an FTE basis)
- Staff: 464.3 (on an FTE basis)
- Student–teacher ratio: 15.25:1

Other information
- Website: www.haverford.k12.pa.us

The School District of Haverford Township is a school district in Haverford Township, Delaware County, Pennsylvania, United States. It was created in 1944.

The district serves all parts of the township, including Havertown. In 2025, Matthew C. Hayes replaced Maureen Reusche as the district's superintendent after the latter's retirement.

== Schools ==
=== Middle school ===
Haverford Middle School is the public middle school of Haverford Township, Pennsylvania, United States, operated by the School District of Haverford Township. It is at 1701 Darby Road in Havertown. The school serves the entirety of Haverford Township.

=== History ===
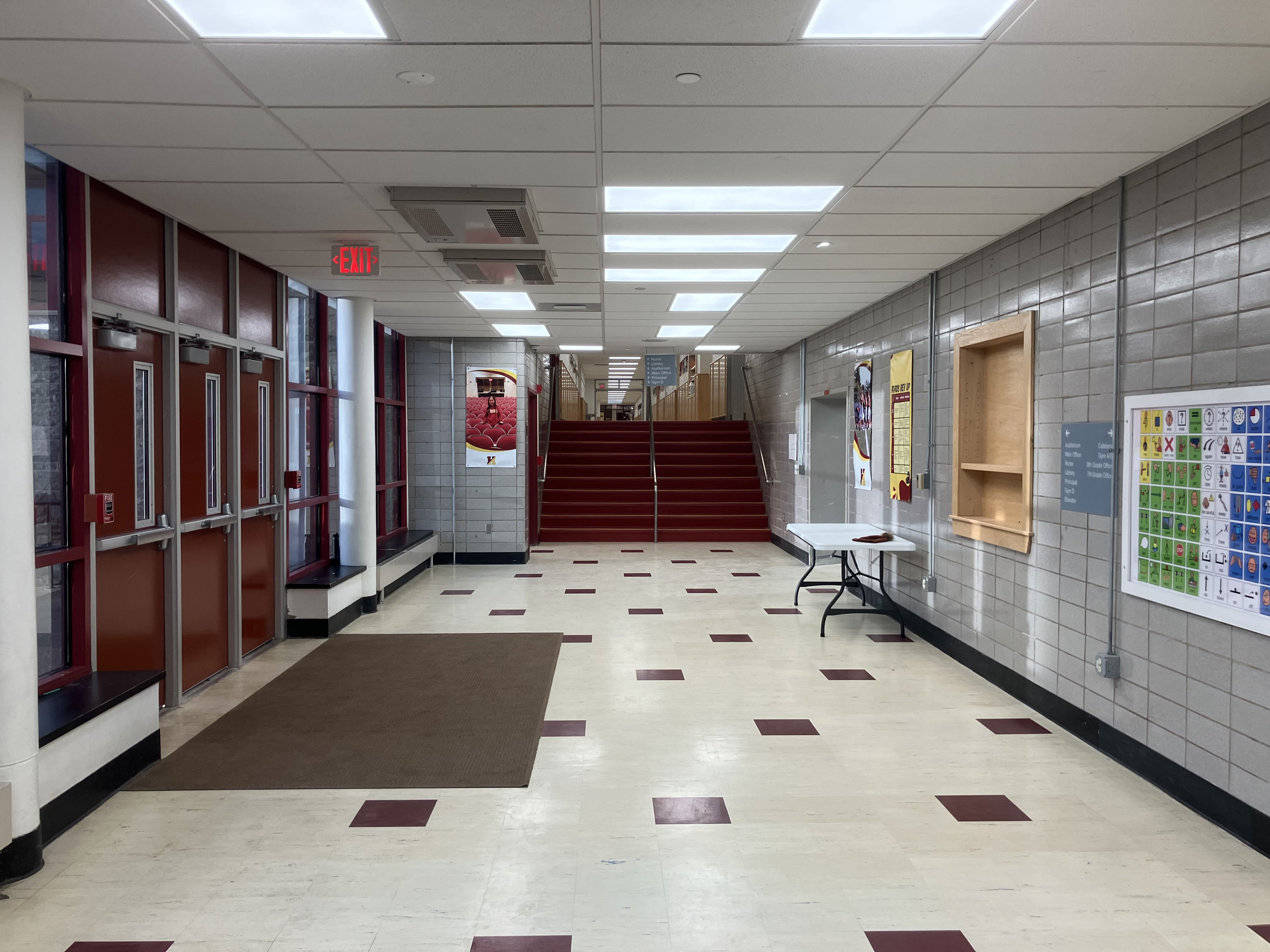
The school's 6th grade entrance in 2025

By the end of World War I, the Township population increased significantly, necessitating a new high school. The former Oakmont School served that purpose until the construction of a new high school building in 1923, which now serves as the Haverford Middle School, following construction of the current high school building in 1956.

The Haverford Middle School is notable for its exterior construction of entirely gray granite stone, taken from the former quarry site in Llanerch, used in many Main Line homes and other institutional buildings. The historic building underwent a $62 million renovation that was completed in 2012.

=== Sports ===
The Haverford Middle School sports teams are called the "Fords," and they have a Model T Ford as their mascot, just as does the High School.

==== Potter Cup ====
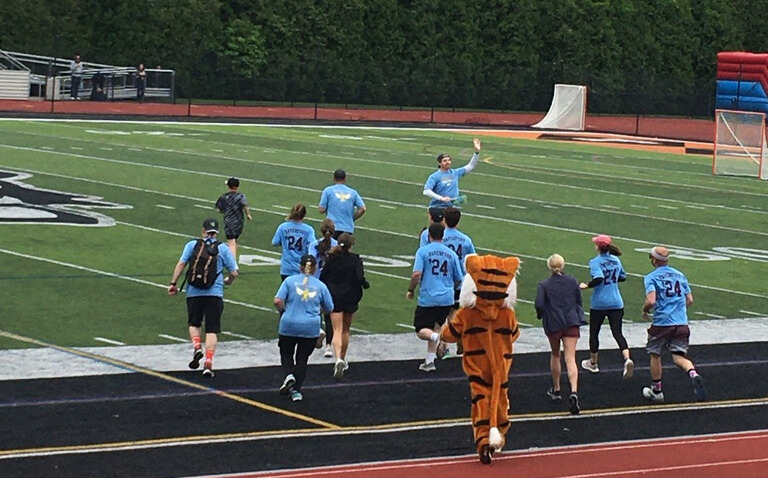
The 2024 Potter Cup

Since 2003, Haverford and Paxon Hollow Middle School have competed in the Potter Cup, an annual pep rally and sporting event sponsored by Alex's Lemonade Stand, a pediatric cancer charity. In its first event the schools have raised over $500,000 for the Foundation to support cancer research.

=== Elementary schools ===
- Chatham Park Elementary School
- Chestnutwold Elementary School
- Coopertown Elementary School
- Lynnewood Elementary School
- Manoa Elementary School

=== Former schools ===
- Brookline Elementary School
- Llanerch Elementary School
- Oakmont Elementary School
