= Haverford Township, Pennsylvania =

Township in Pennsylvania, US

Haverford Township The Township of Haverford, Pennsylvania
- Home rule municipality First Class Township
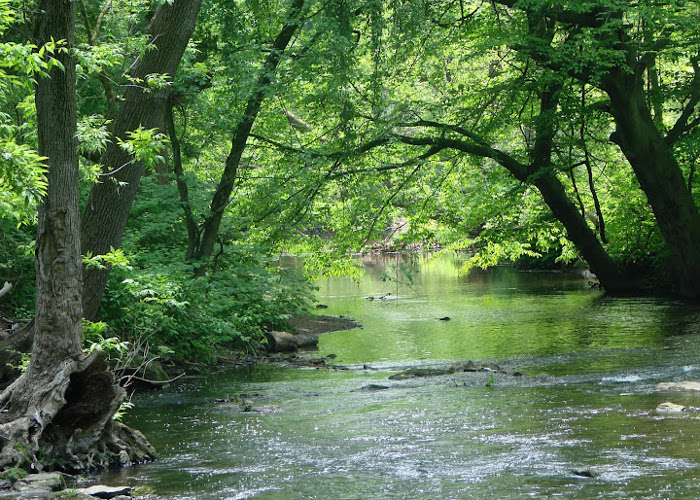
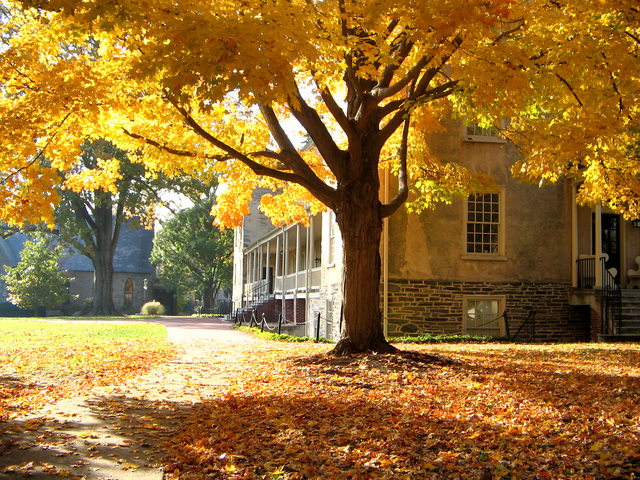
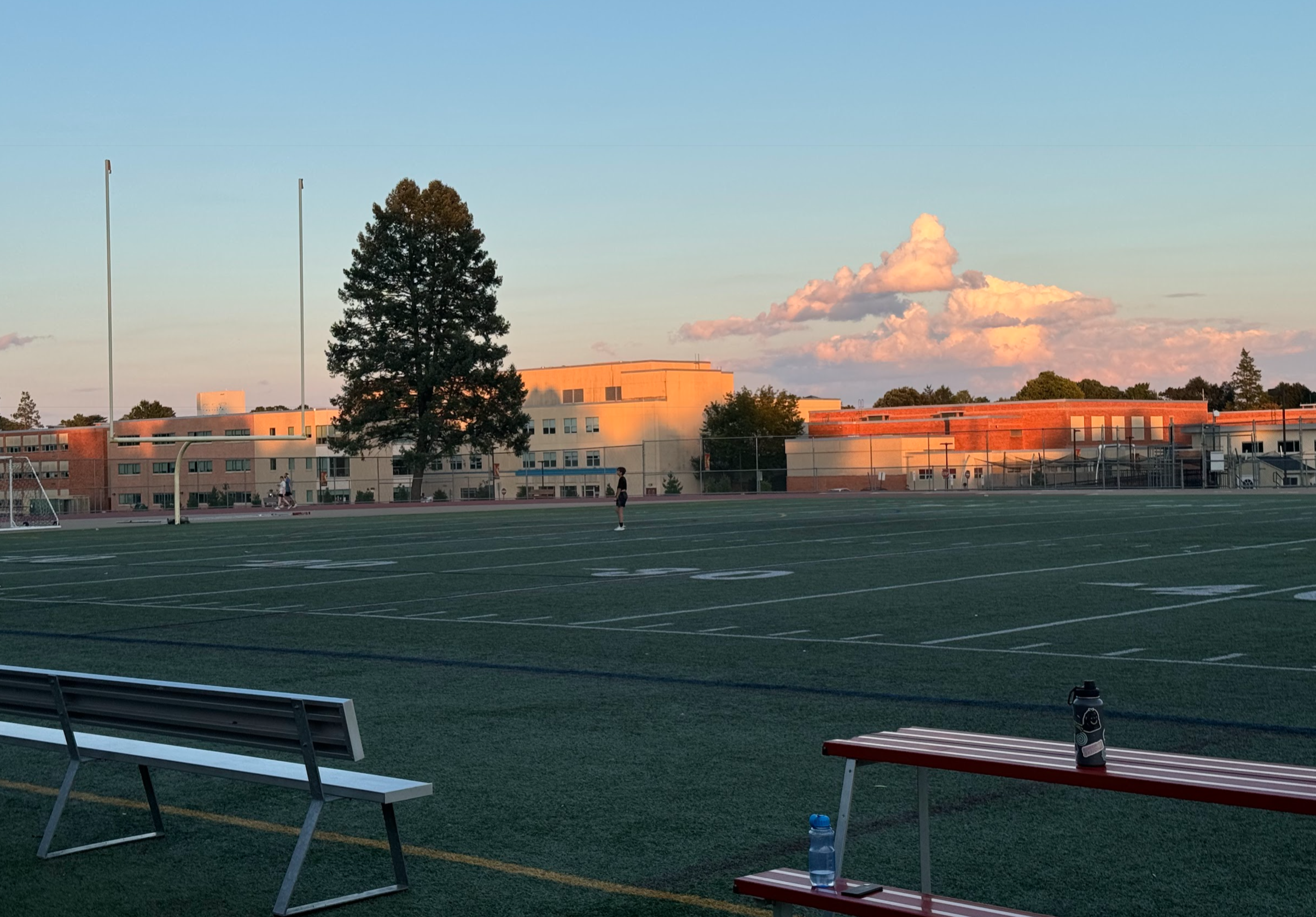
- Darby Creek Founder's Hall at Haverford College Brookline Boulevard Merion Golf Club Grange Estate Haverford High School

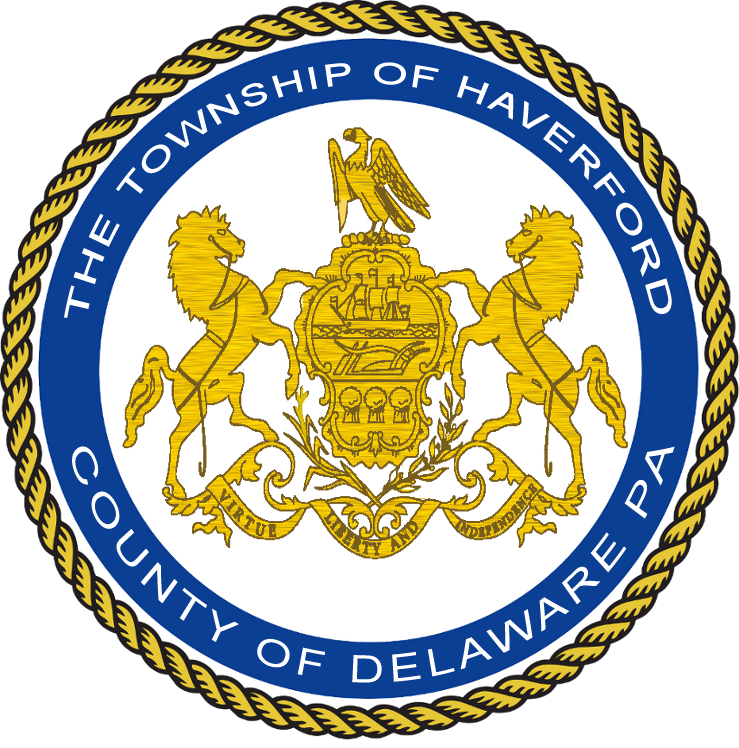
- Seal

- Location in Delaware County and the state of Pennsylvania.

- Location of Pennsylvania in the United States
- Coordinates: 39°59′00″N 75°17′59″W
- Country: United States of America
- State: Pennsylvania
- County: Delaware County, Pennsylvania
- Settled: 1682

Area
  - Total: 9.95 sq mi (25.76 km^{2})
  - Land: 9.95 sq mi (25.76 km^{2})
  - Water: 0 sq mi (0.00 km^{2})
- Elevation: 289 ft (88 m)

Population (2020)
  - Total: 50,431
  - Density: 5,071/sq mi (1,957.9/km^{2})
- Time zone: UTC-5 (EST)
  - Summer (DST): UTC-4 (EDT)
- FIPS code: 42-045-33144
- Website: www.havtwp.org

Haverford Township is a home rule municipality township in Delaware County, Pennsylvania, United States. Haverford is named after the town of Haverfordwest in Wales. It is a commuting suburb located due west of Philadelphia and is officially known as the Township of Haverford. It is referred by its name alone, like many townships in Pennsylvania, simply as Haverford. Despite being under a home rule charter since 1977, it continues to operate under a Board of Commissioners divided into wards, as do "First Class" townships that are still under the Pennsylvania Township Code. Haverford Township was founded in 1682 and incorporated in 1911.

Haverford Township contains portions of the unincorporated communities of Haverford, Ardmore, and Wynnewood and the census designated places of Bryn Mawr and Drexel Hill. The unincorporated community of Havertown lies wholly within Haverford Township. Much of Haverford Township developed as part of the Philadelphia Main Line, growing alongside the Paoli/Thorndale Line, Norristown High Speed Line, and the former trolley routes, now SEPTA Route 103 and SEPTA Route 104. The township population as of the 2020 census was 50,431, making it the 16th-most populous municipality in the state.

Haverford Township holds the distinction of having hosted two different men's major golf championships at two different golf clubs: Merion Golf Club hosted the 1934, 1950, 1971, 1981, and 2013 U.S. Open, and Llanerch Country Club hosted the 1958 PGA Championship.

Haverford, along with Upper Darby, Cheltenham, Lower Merion together form as the major inner ring suburbs of Philadelphia.

== History ==
=== 17th century ===
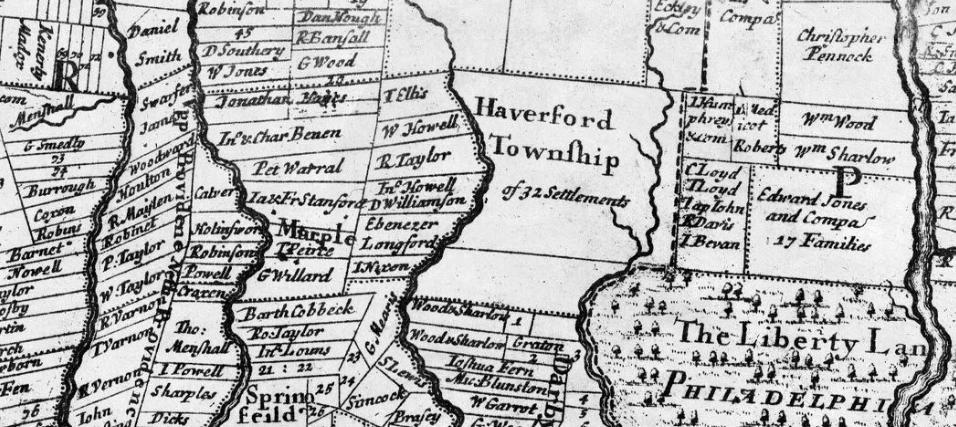
A section of the 1687 Thomas Holmes map of the Welsh Tract, focused on Haverford Township and its surrounding areas.

Haverford Township was laid out by William Penn as part of the Welsh Tract or Barony. In 1681, a representative group of Welsh Quakers met with Penn to discuss their settlement having purchased forty thousand acres of land which today comprises all of Haverford, Radnor and Lower Merion Townships. "Companies of Adventurers" were formed, with the most prominent person in each taking out the patent on 5,000 acres of land as trustee. The first three families arrived in Haverford Township in 1682. Lewis David, Henry Lewis, and William Howell selected land along the southern border. The original settlers, led by John Roberts who had negotiated with William Penn in 1684 to constitute the Tract as a separate county whose local government would use the Welsh language never saw their dream realized. The earliest map of Penn's province dates from 1687.

The area was primarily agricultural until the 1910s. The census returns of 1860 show the value of livestock as $62,485; animals slaughtered $11,255; 46,049 bushels of grain harvested and the value of orchard and garden produce, $4,090.

The two creeks that mark part of the township boundaries, Cobbs Creek and Darby Creek provided mill seats for the early settlers. "As early as the year 1688 a small grist-mill, known as the "Haverford Mill," was built on Cobb's Creek, near where that stream is crossed by the road leading past Haverford Meetinghouse.

=== 18th century ===
Daniel Humphreys purchased the property in 1703 and built a sawmill and fulling and dyeing mill. These were added to Dennis Kelly's holding in 1826 and became the Castle Hill Mills. This site is just north of Eagle Road on the west bank of Cobb's Creek.

On Darby Creek to the west, Richard Hayes Jr., David Morris and Samuel Lewis erected a gristmill, known as Haverford New Mill, in 1707. Later a sawmill was attached. This mill operated until 1904. Near the border with Marple Township, Humphrey Ellis operated a very early fulling mill. In 1807 Henry Lawrence built a sawmill on this site, and in 1832 his son, William, built a gristmill close by. The sawmill remained in the family ownership for more than 125 years, and was, until its demolition, the oldest industry extant in Haverford Township.

About 1800 grist and sawmills were built on the headwaters of Cobb's Creek by Peter Brown, and in 1810 Jonathan Miller built grist and sawmills at what is now the Juncture of Mill Road and Karakung Drive.

=== 19th century ===
Israel Whelen Sr., built the Nitre Hall Powder Mills on Cobb's Creek, which were in operation by 1810. During the American Revolution very little black powder was manufactured in this country, and it was needed for engineering and mining. Between 1810 and 1840, these mills were the second largest powder mills in the U.S., with production of 800,000 pounds in 1812. The mills ceased operations in 1840 and were sold to Dennis Kelly, who converted them for the manufacture of cotton and wooden goods.

In 1814, Dennis Kelly borrowed capital to purchase a mill-seat on Cobb's Creek. He erected a small wooden factory known as Clinton Mills. This was a highly successful venture and, after enlarging the mill, he built Cedar Grove Mill further downstream. Dennis Kelly provided material for the U.S. government from 1817 until 1860 with contracts ranging from $1,800 to $41,370. Improved transportation opened the township to development.

=== 20th century ===
The transformation of Haverford Township from an agrarian spread of farms and mills began just after the turn of the 20th century. The railroads bought acres of land west of Cobb's Creek for their planned developments. Rail lines ran from 69th Street in Upper Darby outward to Ardmore, West Chester and Norristown. Along the rail lines the railroad built the first planned suburban communities Llanerch, 1897 and the most fully developed, Brookline, 1909. While Beechwood, Oakmont and Manoa date from the same period the major housing tracts do not appear until after World War II along with the development of Chatham Park. These communities are now included under the postal address "Havertown."

Several golf courses were developed. Merion Cricket Club Golf Association incorporated Clifton Hall an old farmhouse, in their clubhouse. They have 140 acres in the main course or East Course and 160 acres in the West Course. The Llanerch Country Club consists of 126 acres. The Pennsylvania Railroad Golf Club was established in 1925 on 109 acres bounded by Earlington Road, Manoa Road and City Line. This property was sold in 1943 to Warner West Corporation, which developed Chatham Park.

== Historical sites ==
=== Lawrence Cabin ===
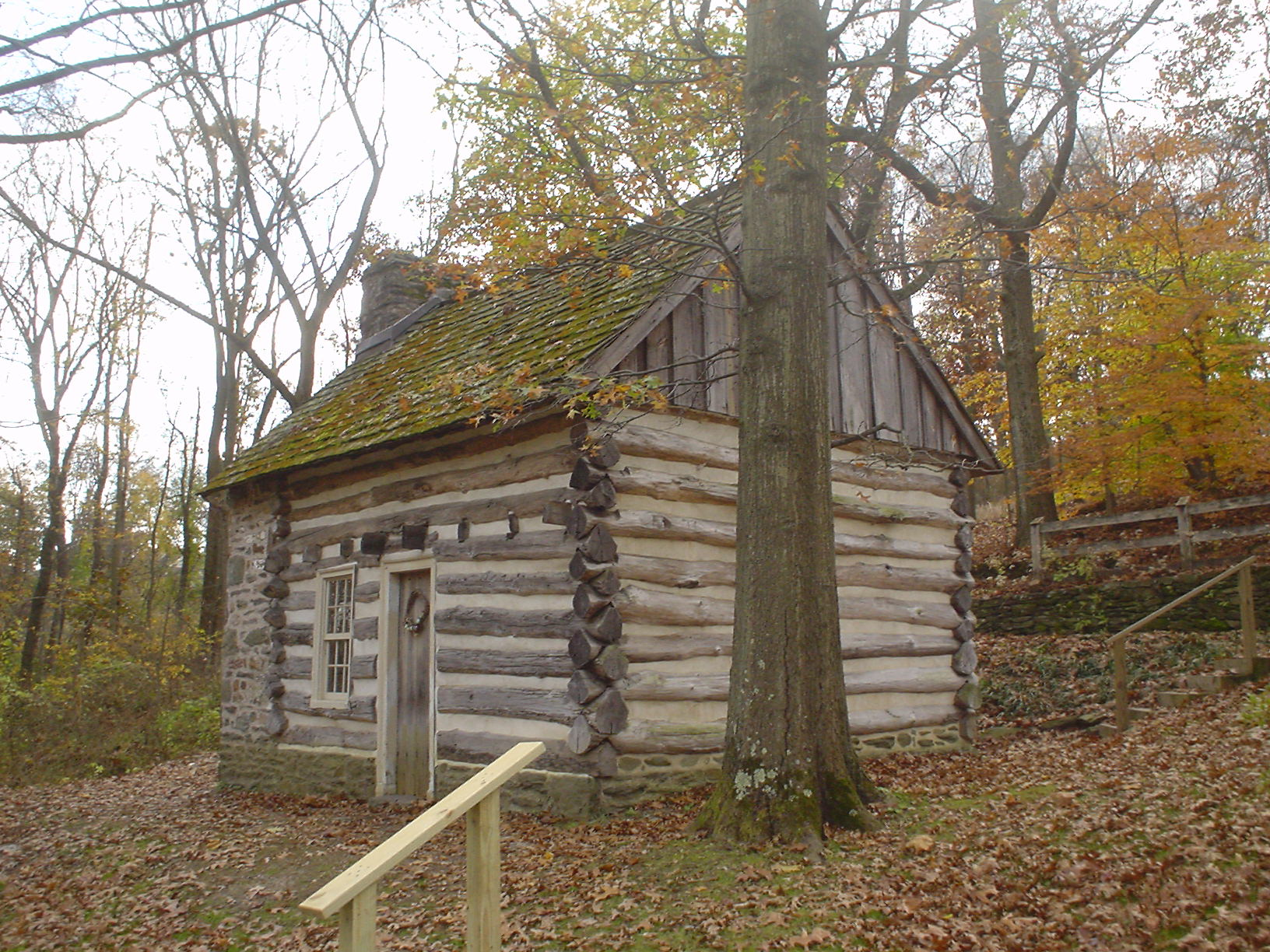
Lawrence Cabin

David Lawrence was one of the early Welsh settlers in Haverford Township. He emigrated with his wife Elinor Ellis and her family in 1684, and took up part of his father-in-law's land grant. His son Henry Lawrence purchased 209 acres along Cobbs Creek in 1709. It has not been determined whether the log house predates this purchase, but a 2 1/2-story stone addition was built c. 1730, and later a clapboard summer kitchen was added. It became known as the Three Generation House, and remained in Lawrence family ownership until 1942.

=== Federal School ===
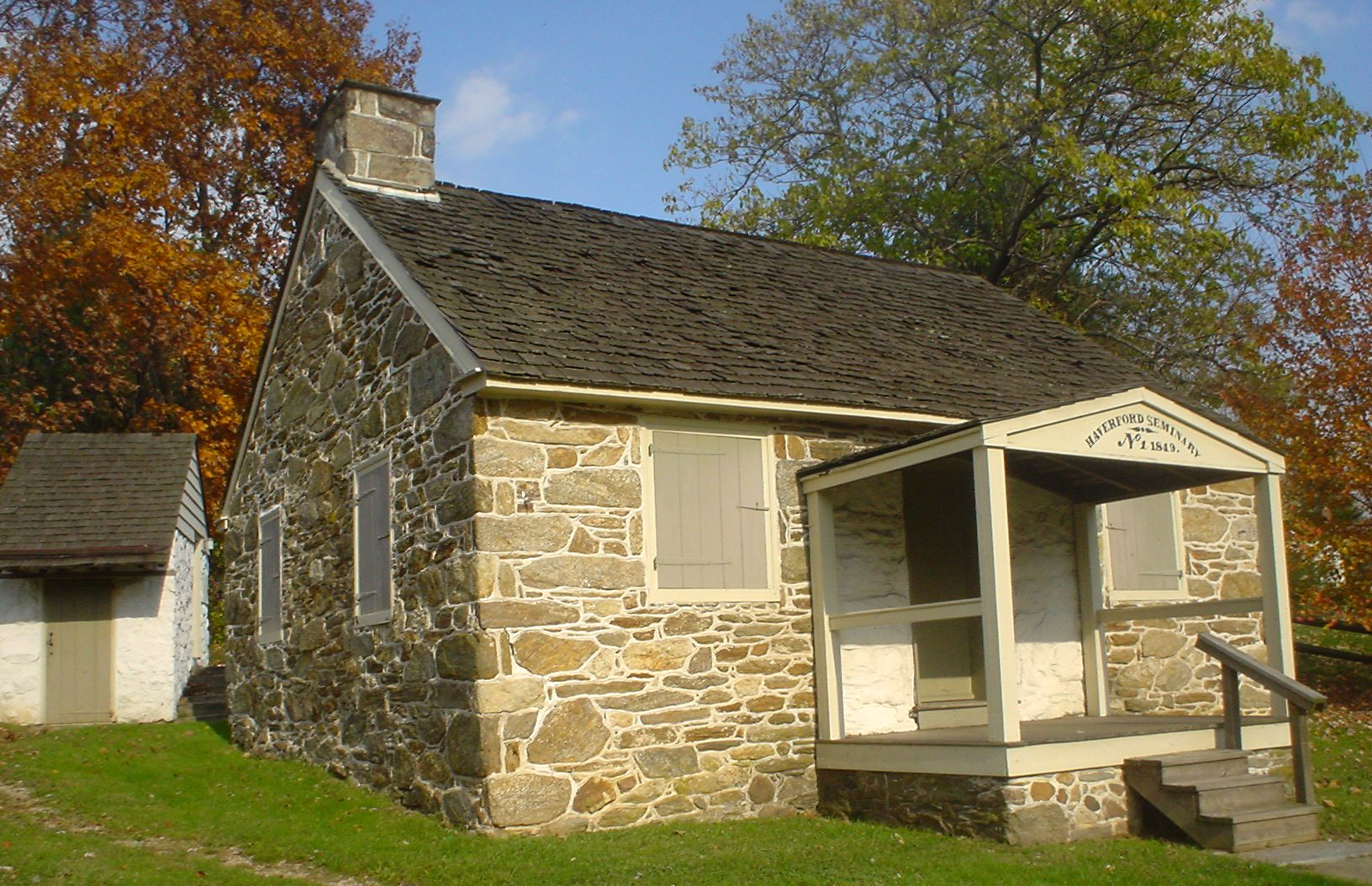
Federal School, built in 1797

The first record of the purchase of land for a school in Haverford Township was October 29, 1797. Alexander Symington received 5 shillings for an irregularly shaped building lot of one quarter of an acre and three perches near the present day intersection of Darby and Coopertown Roads. Payment for the land was made by five trustees: Philip Sheaff, William Brook, Francis Lee, David Lyons and Benjamin Hayes Smith, "for the purpose of erecting a school thereon for the use of said Township of Haverford". The 1797 Federal School is on the National Register of Historic Places.

=== Pont Reading House ===
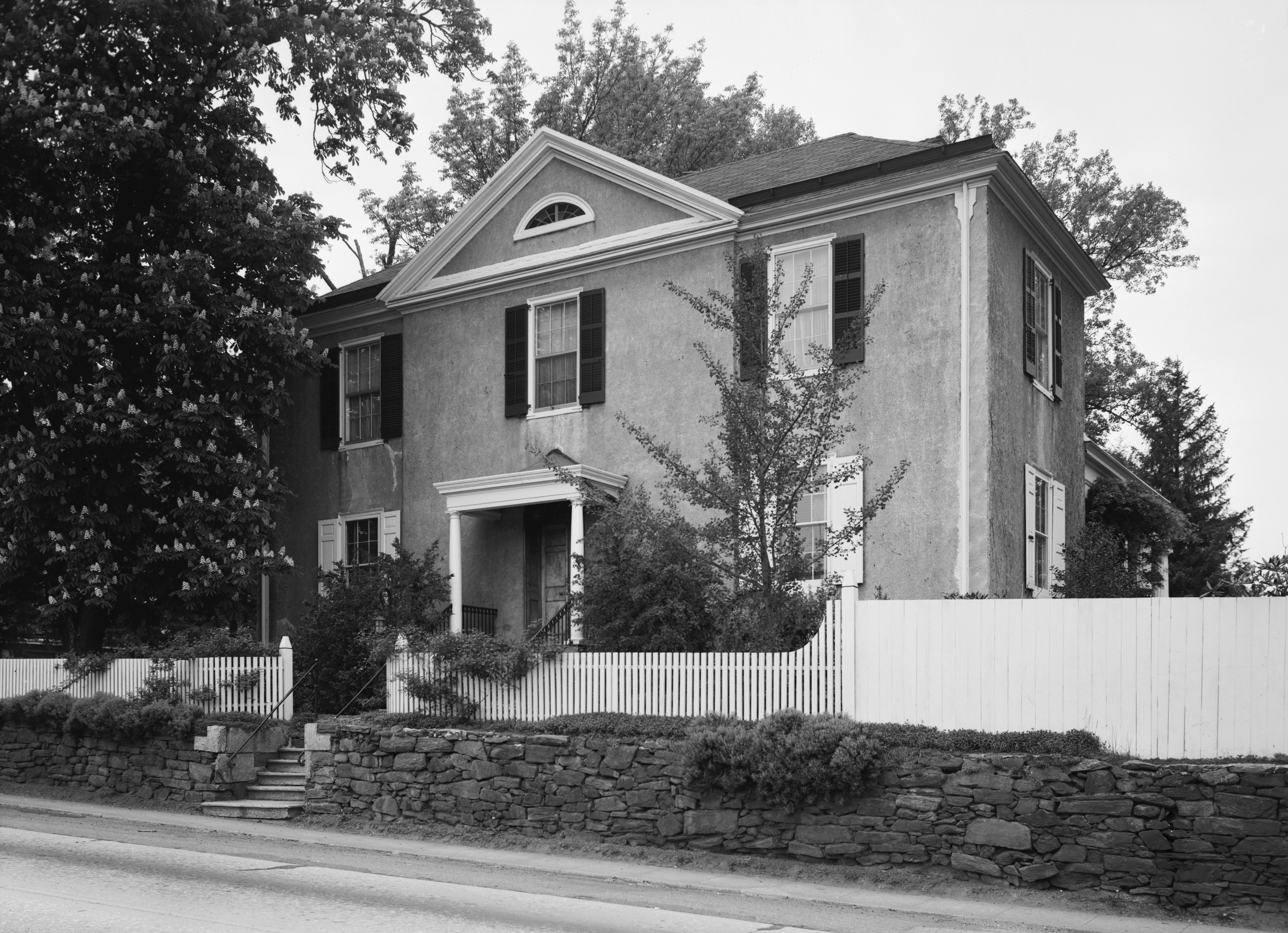
Pont Reading's earliest section, c. 1683

"Pont Reading House" is situated on the Easterly side of Haverford Road, Haverford Township, Delaware County, Pennsylvania, at the corner where the Ardmore Trolley passes en route between Brookline—Oakmont and Ardmore, and near Ardmore Junction Station of the Philadelphia and Western Railway. It was the home of Joshua Humphreys, the shipbuilder and naval architect known for constructing the original six frigates of the United States Navy. Here, this specimen of early American homes still stands, is well-preservation and in good repair, as it has since 1813, when the front section was built and added to the middle three-story section erected 1730–60, which in turn was then added to the rear and original two-story structure, built possibly as early as 1683. One of the log walls of this first and original section can still be seen as one enters a door on one of the sides thereof, All surrounded and shaded with some large trees, of the original forest, still surviving.

=== Nitre Hall ===
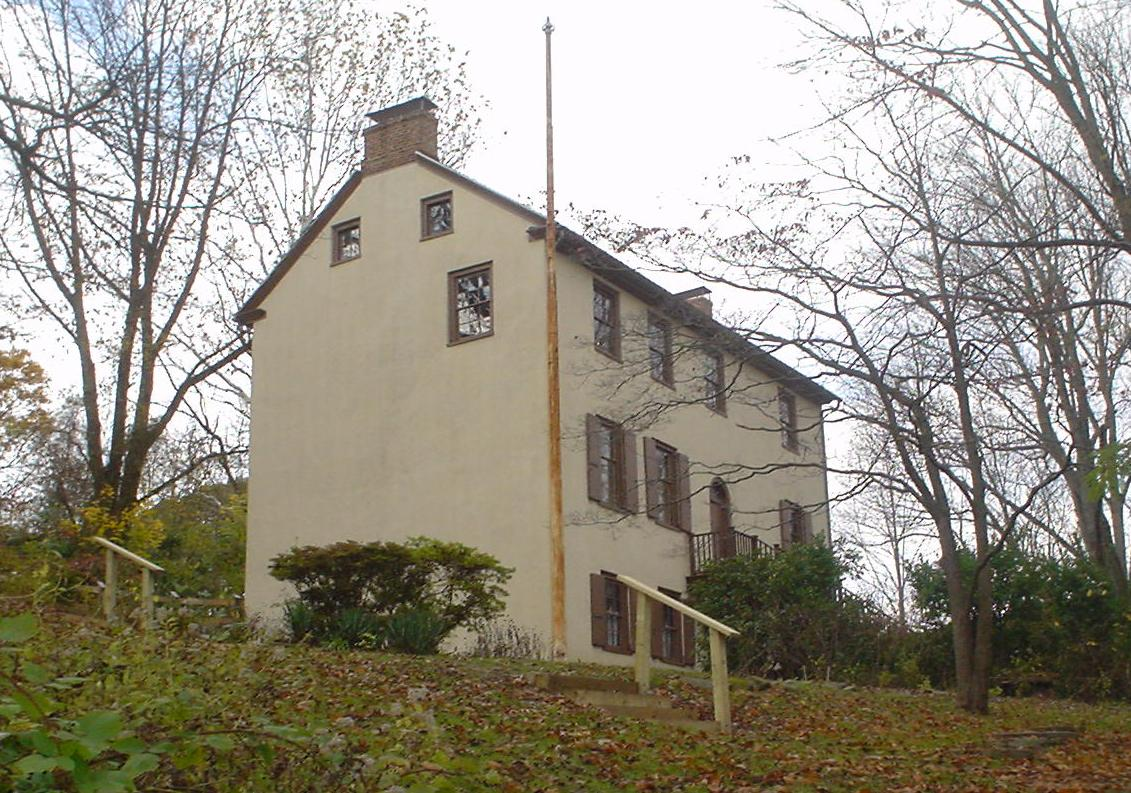
Nitre Hall, c. 1800

The Nitre Hall Powder Mills, which gave the valley its name, were built by Israel Whelen shortly after 1800. The young nation had growing needs for explosives, and the mills prospered with an output of 800,000 pounds during the War of 1812. Nitre Hall Mills produced a quality and quantity of black powder in the U.S. second only to the Dupont Mills on the Brandywine. After the powder mills closed in 1840, Dennis Kelly bought the property and converted the buildings to the manufacture of textiles. Nitre Hall is on the National Register of Historic Places.

=== Grange Estate ===
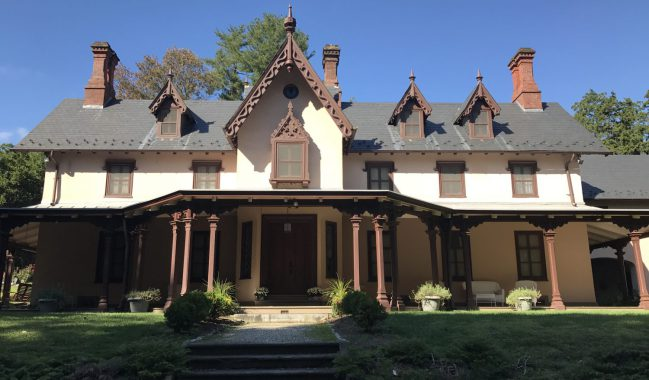
Grange Estate, c. 1700

The Grange Estate, also known as Maen-Coch and Clifton Hall, is a historic mansion in Havertown. Built in 1750 and expanded several times through the 1850s, it was purchased by Haverford Township in 1974. The building was added to the National Register of Historic Places in 1976 as The Grange.

== Geography ==
Haverford Township is located in the northeast portion of Delaware County. According to the United States Census Bureau, the township has a total area of 10.0 square miles (26 km^{2}), all of it land. The township is part of the Philadelphia Main Line and the Welsh Tract. Waterways in Haverford Township include Cobbs Creek, Darby Creek, Naylors Run and Meadowbrook Run.

=== Adjacent municipalities ===
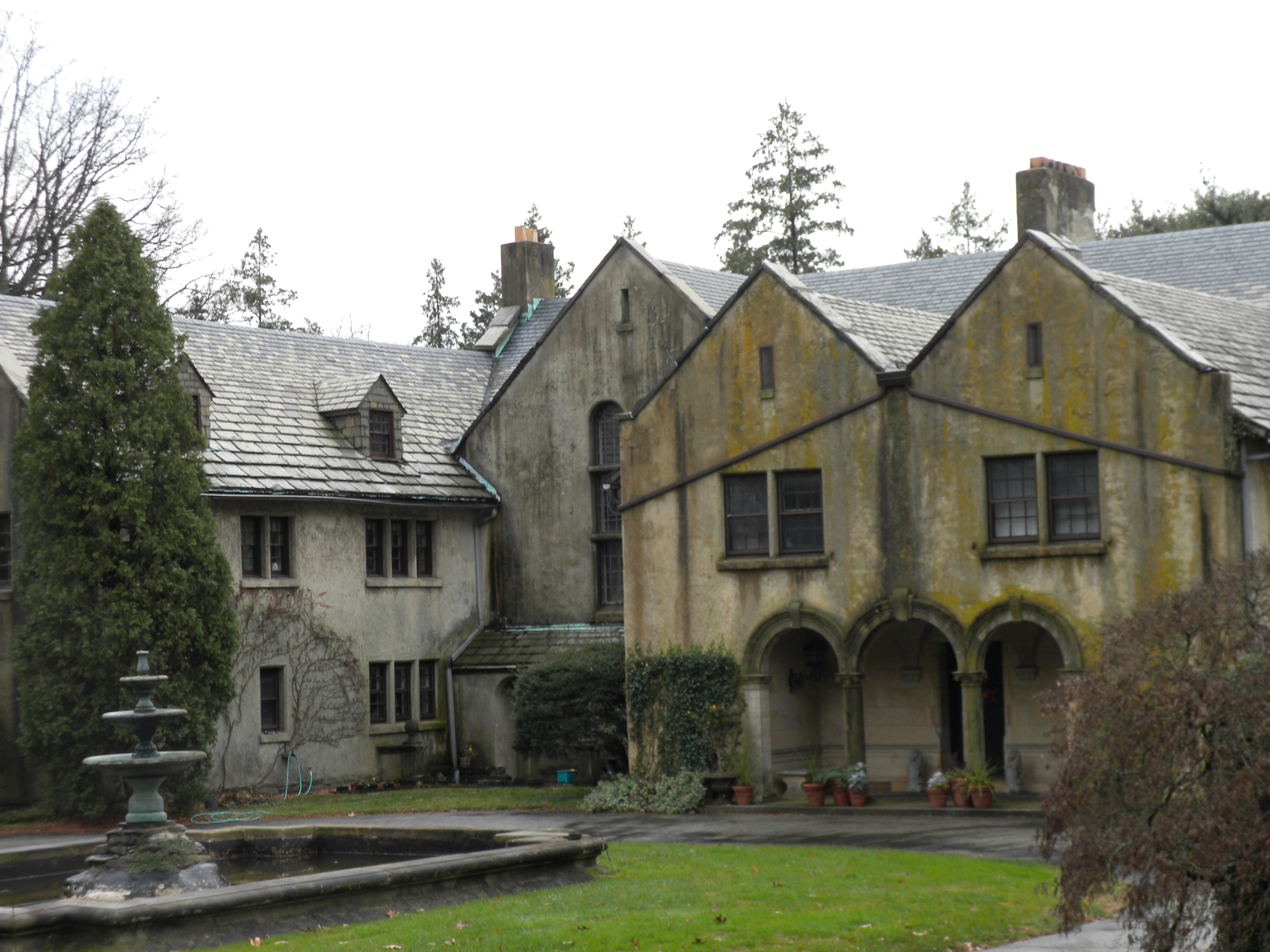
Allgates, November 2009

- Lower Merion Township, Montgomery County – northeast
- City of Philadelphia – east
- Upper Darby Township, Delaware County – south
- Springfield Township, Delaware County – southwest
- Marple Township, Delaware County – west
- Radnor Township, Delaware County – northwest

=== Climate ===
Haverford Township straddles the boundary between a hot-summer humid continental climate (Dfa) and a humid subtropical climate (Cfa). The hardiness zone is 7a. The average monthly temperature in the Brookline/Oakmont vicinity ranges from 32.1 °F in January to 77.2 °F in July.

== Demographics ==
Historical population
Census	Pop.	Note	%±
1900	2,414		—
1910	3,989		65.2%
1920	6,631		66.2%
1930	21,362		222.2%
1940	27,594		29.2%
1950	39,641		43.7%
1960	54,019		36.3%
1970	56,873		5.3%
1980	52,365		−7.9%
1990	49,848		−4.8%
2000	48,498		−2.7%
2010	48,491		0.0%
2020	50,431		4.0%

As of Census 2020, the racial makeup of the township was 85.5% White, 3.5% African American, 0.1% Native American, 5.0% Asian, 0.8% from other races, and 3.4% from two or more races. Hispanic or Latino of any race were 3.0% of the population.

As of the 2020 census, there were 50,431 people, 17,923 households, and 16,489 households with children residing in the township. The population density was 4,844.6 inhabitants per square mile (1,870.5/km^{2}). There were 18,600 housing units at an average density of 1,835.8 per square mile (708.8/km^{2}).

There were 17,923 households, out of which 33.4% had children under the age of 18 living with them, 65.4% were married couples living together, 6.2% had a female householder with no husband present, and 25.6% were non-families. The average family size was 3.2.

The age distribution was 24.2% under the age of 18, 7.7% from 18 to 24, 22.7% from 45 to 64, and 18.8% who were 65 years of age or older. The median age was 40 years. For every 100 females, there were 94.5 males.

According to the 2022 American Community Survey, the median income for a household in the township was $124,875, and the median income for a family was $161,860. The per capita income for the township was $58,471. About 3.1% of the population were below the poverty line. 62.5% of residents aged 25 years and older had a Bachelor's degree or higher.

Most common first ancestries reported in Haverford township:

- Irish (34.2%)
- Italian (20.3%)
- German (15.9%)
- English (10.9%)
- Polish (5.2%)
- French (1.5%)
- Sub-Saharan African (0.6%)
- Norwegian (0.5%)

Race / Ethnicity (NH = Non-Hispanic)	Pop 1990	Pop 2000	Pop 2010	Pop 2020	% 1990	% 2000	% 2010	% 2020
White alone (NH)	47,609	45,585	44,245	43,100	95.42%	93.24%	91.61%	85.46%
Black or African American alone (NH)	893	1,028	1,293	1,754	1.79%	2.12%	2.67%	3.47%
Native American or Alaska Native alone (NH)	52	49	43	35	0.00%	0.00%	0.09%	0.07%
Asian alone (NH)	980	1,338	2,048	2,535	1.96%	2.76%	4.22%	5.03%
Native Hawaiian or Pacific Islander alone (NH)	0	6	2	11	0.00%	0.00%	0.00%	0.01%
Other race alone (NH)	28	98	219	411	0.01%	0.20%	0.45%	0.81%
Mixed race or Multiracial (NH)	28	394	641	2,585	0.01%	0.80%	1.32%	3.40%
Hispanic or Latino (any race)	330	431	937	1,530	0.66%	0.10%	3.16%	3.00%
Total	49,892	48,498	48,491	50,431	100.00%	100.00%	100.00%	100.00%

== Neighborhoods ==
Haverford Township is divided into smaller census designated places and neighborhoods. These reflect either historical designations or planned developments, including:

Adele
Allgates
Ardmore
Bon Air
Beechwood
Brookline
Bryn Mawr
Chatham Village
Coopertown
Haverford
Llanerch
Manoa
Merion Golf Manor
Merwood
Oakmont
Paddock Farms
Penfield
Pilgrim Gardens
Powder Mill
Richland
Westgate Hills
Wynnewood

== Government and politics ==
The township is part of the Pennsylvania 5th congressional district, the 166th and the 163rd State House districts, and the 17th Pennsylvania State Senate District.

== Golf ==
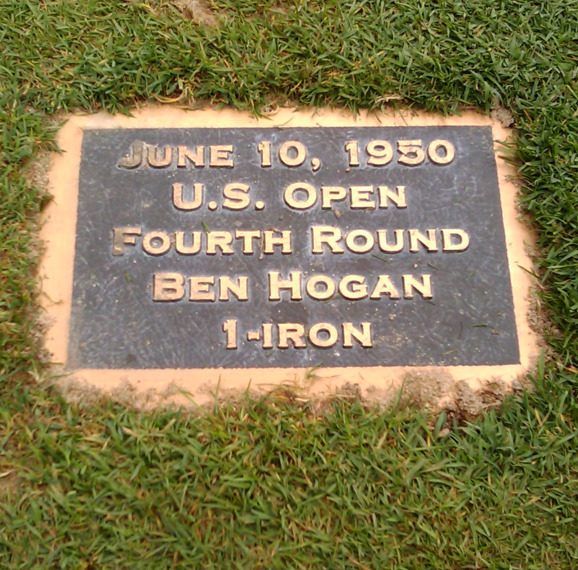
A plaque on the 18th fairway at Merion East Golf Course commemorating Ben Hogan's famous shot from the 1950 U.S. Open

A total of six men's Major Championships and 11 men's and women's US Amateur Championships, have been staged within Haverford Township. Bobby Jones completed his grand slam at Merion in 1930, and Ben Hogan made his comeback from a horrific car accident in the 1950 US Open staged at Merion.

Dow Finsterwald finished ahead of Billy Casper and Sam Snead in 1958 at Llanerch Country Club, the first PGA Championship held after the format was switched from match play to stroke play. Lee Trevino defeated Jack Nicklaus in an 18-hole playoff in 1971 at Merion, when he famously tossed a rubber snake at Nicklaus on the first tee on the day of the playoff. The US Open returned to Merion in 2013, and was won by Justin Rose.

Merion (East) is the future site of the 2026 U.S. Amateur, 2030 U.S. Open, 2034 U.S. Women's Open, 2040 U.S. Open, 2046 U.S. Women's Open and the 2050 U.S. Open.

=== Past USGA Championships ===
- 1904 U.S. Women's Amateur (Merion Golf Club) Georgianna Bishop
- 1909 U.S. Women's Amateur (Merion Golf Club) Dorothy Campbell
- 1916 U.S. Amateur (Merion Golf Club) Chick Evans
- 1924 U.S. Amateur (Merion Golf Club) Bobby Jones
- 1926 U.S. Women's Amateur (Merion Golf Club) Helen Stetson
- 1930 U.S. Amateur (Merion Golf Club) Bobby Jones
- 1934 U.S. Open (Merion Golf Club) Olin Dutra
- 1949 U.S. Women's Amateur (Merion Golf Club) Dorothy Porter
- 1950 U.S. Open (Merion Golf Club) Ben Hogan
- 1958 PGA Championship (Llanerch Country Club) Dow Finsterwald
- 1966 U.S. Amateur (Merion Golf Club) Gary Cowan
- 1971 U.S. Open (Merion Golf Club) Lee Trevino
- 1981 U.S. Open (Merion Golf Club) David Graham
- 1989 U.S. Amateur (Merion Golf Club) Chris Patton
- 1998 U.S. Girls' Junior (Merion Golf Club) Leigh Anne Hardin
- 2005 U.S. Amateur (Merion Golf Club) Edoardo Molinari
- 2013 U.S. Open (Merion Golf Club) Justin Rose

=== Future USGA Championships ===
- 2026 U.S. Amateur (Merion Golf Club)
- 2030 U.S. Open (Merion Golf Club)
- 2034 U.S. Women's Open (Merion Golf Club)
- 2040 U.S. Open (Merion Golf Club)
- 2046 U.S. Women's Open (Merion Golf Club)
- 2050 U.S. Open (Merion Golf Club)

== Transportation ==
=== Roads and highways ===
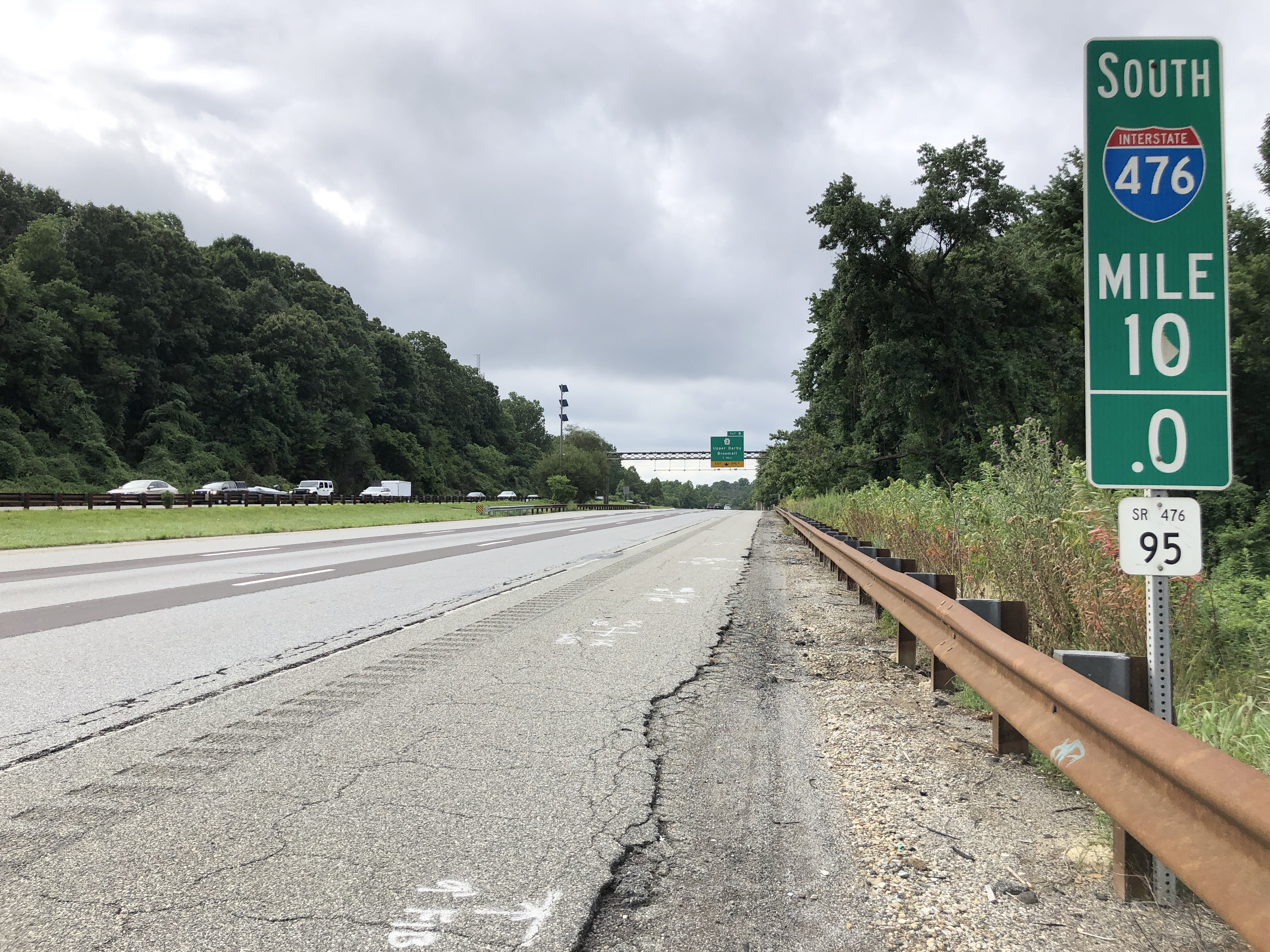
I-476 Blue Route southbound in Haverford Township

As of 2018, there were 158.26 miles (254.69 km) of public roads in Haverford Township, of which 34.48 miles (55.49 km) were maintained by Pennsylvania Department of Transportation (PennDOT) and 123.78 miles (199.20 km) were maintained by the township.

The most prominent highway passing through Haverford Township is the I-476 Blue Route, which follows a north-south alignment along the western edge of the township, though the nearest exits are in adjacent townships. U.S. Route 1 follows Township Line Road along a southwest-northeast alignment along the township's southeastern border. U.S. Route 30 follows Lancaster Avenue on a west-east alignment across the northern tip of the township. Pennsylvania Route 3 follows West Chester Pike along a northwest-southeast alignment through the southern portion of the township. Finally, Pennsylvania Route 320 briefly crosses the western tip of the township along Sproul Road.

=== Public transportation ===
SEPTA's Norristown High Speed Line passes through Haverford Township along its route between 69th Street Transportation Center and Norristown Transportation Center and services the following stations within the township: Township Line Road, Penfield, Beechwood–Brookline, Wynnewood Road, Ardmore Junction, Ardmore Avenue, and Haverford. Haverford has the most M Line stops of any township along the line; 7 stops. SEPTA provides Suburban Bus service to Haverford Township along routes 103, 104, 105, 110, 112, 115, 120, 123, and 126, serving points of interest in the township and offering connections to 69th Street Transportation Center and other suburbs.

== Education ==
=== Primary education ===
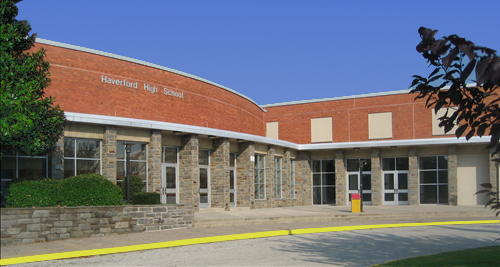
Haverford High School

The first recorded purchase of land for educational purposes in Haverford Township was made on October 28, 1797, five shillings "for the purpose of erecting a school thereon for the use of said Township of Haverford". A stone structure erected on a site along Darby Road at the crossroads Coopertown served as a school until 1872. Today, known as the Federal School, the building still stands and serves as a window to history for Haverford Township children. Every fourth-grade student spends a day at the Federal School learning what it was like to be a student in 1797. During the 1800s four additional one-room schools and one parochial school were built. The latter part of the 19th century was the beginning of the present school system. After World War II, additions were made to existing schools, a new high school and three one-story elementary schools were built. Today there is one middle school, one senior high, five elementary schools, four parochial schools and four private schools.

Public school students living in Haverford Township attend schools in the School District of Haverford Township. The District currently has a student enrollment of approximately 5,475, and, residents number over 49,000. There are seven schools in the District: Chatham Park, Chestnutwold, Coopertown, Lynnewood, and Manoa elementary schools, with grades kindergarten through 5; Haverford Middle School, with grades 6–8; and Haverford High School, with grades 9-12.

Residents of Haverford Township benefit from a wide range of school supported services, including Adult Evening School; the Golden Age Program, the Senior Citizen Prom and the Tax-Aide Program for senior citizens; and Delaware County Community College courses for all residents. Haverford, which is a member of the Delaware County Chamber of Commerce and the Main Line Chamber of Commerce, maintains partnerships with local universities and colleges, businesses, service organizations, realtors, community groups and senior citizen organizations. In 1989, the District's Community Relations program received a "National Achievement Award" from the National School Public Relations Association.

Haverford is also home to Haverford College, an undergraduate liberal arts school recognized as a selective institution of higher learning. Like Haverford Township; the college founded by Welsh quakers.

=== Haverford College ===
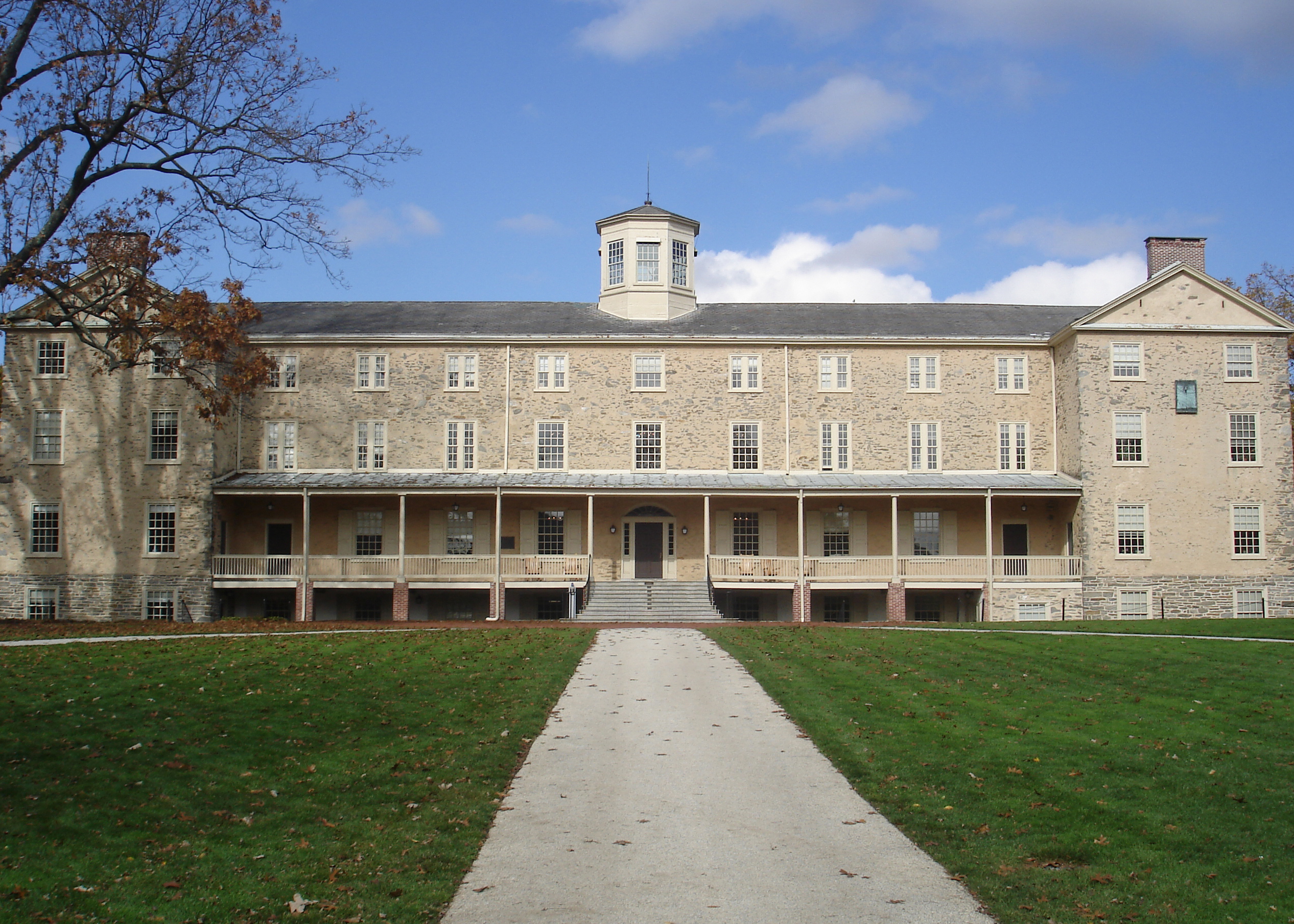
Founders Hall at Haverford College

Haverford College is located within Haverford Township with a portion partially within Lower Merion Township, was the first College founded by the Society of Friends in the United States in 1833, has several historic structures on its 225-acre property. ^{[2]}Of the nation's 357 "best" colleges, the Princeton Review ranks Haverford as #6 for Best Overall Undergraduate Experience. In addition, Haverford, unlike many of its peers, is located within easy travel of a large metropolitan center and the opportunities that Philadelphia offers.

== Notable current and former residents ==
- Garrett Brown, inventor of the Steadicam
- Mark DiFelice, former Major League Baseball pitcher for the Milwaukee Brewers organization
- Jimmy Dykes, third and second baseman for the Philadelphia Athletics and Chicago White Sox; manager of the Chicago White Sox, Philadelphia Athletics, Baltimore Orioles, Cincinnati Reds, Detroit Tigers, and Cleveland Indians
- Theodore Freeman, NASA astronaut
- Murray Gerstenhaber, professor, mathematician and lawyer
- Randy Grossman, former tight end for eight seasons for the Pittsburgh Steelers in the National Football League; four-time Super Bowl champion
- Brendan Hansen, Olympic swimmer and six-time medalist, former world record holder in the 100-meter and 200-meter breaststroke events
- William Hoeveler, lawyer and judge
- Charles Humphreys, Pennsylvania delegate to the Continental Congress
- Joshua Humphreys, builder of the USS Constitution ("Old Ironsides")
- Steve Joachim, former professional football player for the New York Jets; won the Maxwell Award in 1974
- Ross Katz, Academy Award-nominated film producer
- Atwater Kent, inventor and prominent radio manufacturer
- Billy King, NBA executive, current general manager of the Brooklyn Nets
- John LeClair, NHL, former player, Philadelphia Flyers and Pittsburgh Penguins
- Joe Lunardi, ESPN's March Madness bracketologist
- Glen Macnow, sports talk radio host
- Buddy Marucci, 2008 United States Senior Men's Amateur Golf Champion, U.S. Walker Cup captain 2007 and 2009, 1995 U.S. Amateur runner-up
- Clay Myers, photographer, animal welfare advocate
- Mitchel Resnick, MIT professor and creator of programmable bricks, the forerunner of LEGO Mindstorms, Scratch software and co-founder of Computer Clubhouse
- Pia Reyes, November 1988 Playboy centerfold
- Louis Robertshaw, lieutenant general in the United States Marine Corps
- Jean Shiley, high jumper, 1932 Olympic gold medal winner
- Andy Talley, head coach of Villanova University football, one of the most successful FCS college football coaches in history
- Jack Thayer, survivor of the Titanic sinking
- Michael Tollin, film director and producer
- Jennifer Toof, appeared on VH1's Flavor of Love 2, Flavor of Love Girls: Charm School, and I Love Money
- Sam Venuto, former American football running back in the National Football League.
- Tom Verica, actor and director
- Charles Alan Wright (1927-2000), American constitutional lawyer widely considered to have been the foremost authority in the United States on constitutional law and federal procedure; law professor, University of Texas School of Law, (1955-2000), University of Minnesota Law School (1950-1955)
- Jeff Yass, The richest man in Pennsylvania and co-founder and managing director of Susquehanna International Group (SIG)
- Mark G. Yudof, president, University of California (June 2008 – present); former chancellor, University of Texas system (August 2002 to May 2008), former president, University of Minnesota (1997 to 2002)
- Marian Hill, an electronic duo consisting of Jeremy Lloyd and Samantha Gongol, who made their debut in 2016, with an AirPods commercial with their hit single “Down”
- Stephan Grupp, a pediatric oncologist and professor at the Perelman School of Medicine at the University of Pennsylvania who developed the first highly effective childhood cancer immunotherapy and delivered CAR T cell therapy to the first pediatric patient in the world
- Alex G, singer-songwriter and solo artist
- Emily Yacina, singer-songwriter and solo artist
- Betty and Richard T. James, inventors of the slinky who lived in West Gate Hills and Brookline.

== Points of interest ==
- Haverford College
- Haverford College Arboretum
- The Haverford School
- Merion Golf Club
- Llanerch Country Club
- Old Haverford Friends Meetinghouse
- Grange Estate
- Oakmont
- Brookline

== See also ==
Preceded by Upper Darby	Bordering communities of Philadelphia	Succeeded by Lower Merion; Montgomery County
