= Mary Lloyd =

Mary Lloyd may refer to:

- Mary Lloyd, birth name of Molly Drake (1915–1993), English poet and musician
- Mary Lloyd (WRNS officer) (1902–1972), director of the Women's Royal Naval Service (WRNS)
- Mary Lloyd (sculptor) (1819–1896), Welsh sculptor
- Mary Lloyd (abolitionist) (1795–1865), British abolitionist
- Mary Helen Wingate Lloyd (1868–1934), American horticulturist
- Mary Merrall (1890–1973), English actress who may have been born Mary Lloyd

== See also ==
- Marie Lloyd (1870–1922), English music hall singer, comedian, and musical theatre actress
- Mary Lloyd Jones (born 1934), Welsh printmaker and artist
- Mari Lwyd, the horse skull puppet of Welsh wassailing tradition
