= John Ross (American patriot) =

- Born: January 29, 1729; Tain, Scotland
- Died: April 8, 1800 (aged 71); Philadelphia, Pennsylvania
- Occupation: merchant

John Ross (Tain, Ross, Scotland, 29 January 1729—8 April 1800, Philadelphia, Pennsylvania) was a merchant during the American Revolution.

== Biography ==
Ross relocated early to Perth, Scotland, and entered into mercantile pursuits. In 1763, he emigrated and arrived in Philadelphia, Pennsylvania, where he became a shipping merchant.

At the beginning of the conflicts with the mother country, he espoused the cause of the colonies, and was a signer of the non-importation agreement of the citizens of Philadelphia in 1765. He presided at the meeting of the mechanics and tradesmen of the city held on June 9, 1774, to consider a letter from the artificers of New York, and was a member of the committee to reply to the same. On September 16, 1775, he was appointed muster-master of the Pennsylvania navy, which office he resigned, February 23, 1776, to concentrate on his commercial affairs.

In May 1776, he was employed by the committee of commerce of Congress to purchase clothes, arms, and powder for the army. This necessitated the establishment of agencies in Nantes and Paris, and Ross made several visits to France during the war. In this duty he advanced or pledged his credit for £20,000 more than was authorized by Congress, much to his later embarrassment and subsequent loss.

He was on familiar terms with George Washington, Benjamin Franklin, and Robert Morris, and several entries in General Washington's diary, during the sittings of the convention to frame the United States Constitution, tell of engagements to dine with Mr. Ross at his country place, Grange Farm or the Grange, named after the home of Lafayette. This farm was located on the old Haverford Road near Frankford in Delaware County, Pennsylvania. He bought the property, formerly called Clifton Hall, from his father-in-law, Capt. Charles Cruikshank, in 1783 and renamed it in honor of Lafayette's home in France.

Note: Not to be confused with the John Ross (d. 1776) who was Betsy Ross's first husband.
