= Haverford, Pennsylvania =

Unincorporated community in Pennsylvania, US

- Unincorporated community
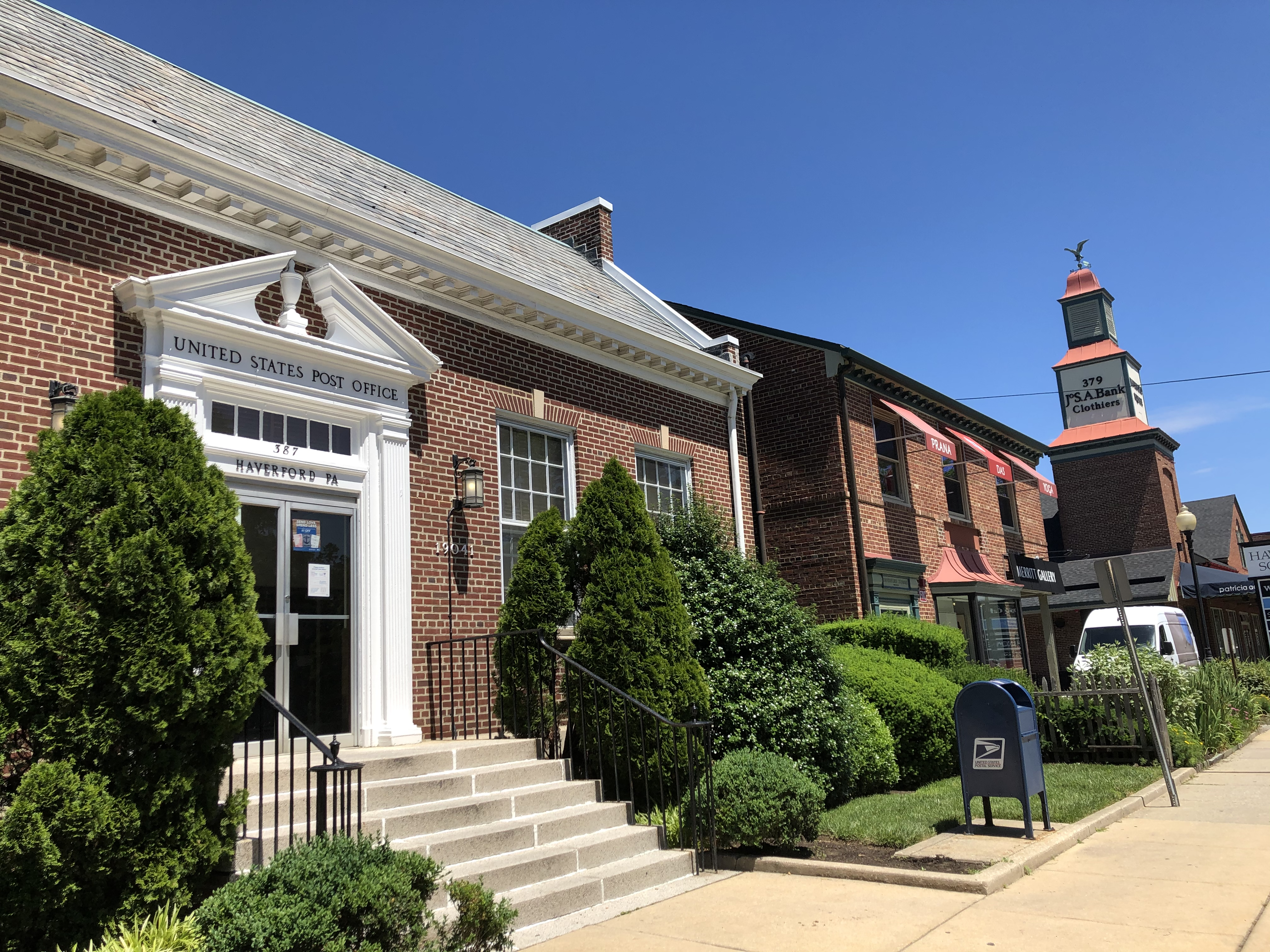
- Haverford post office and Haverford Square shopping center

- Location of Haverford in Pennsylvania Haverford, Pennsylvania (the United States)
- Coordinates: 40°00′47″N 75°17′40″W
- Country: United States
- State: Pennsylvania
- Counties: Delaware/Montgomery
- Townships: Haverford/Lower Merion

Area
  - Land: 3.3 sq mi (8.5 km^{2})
- Elevation: 318 ft (97 m)

Population (2010 US Census)
  - Total: 6,248
  - Density: 1,900/sq mi (730/km^{2})
- Time zone: UTC-5 (EST)
  - Summer (DST): UTC-4 (EDT)
- ZIP code: 19083
- Area codes: 610 and 484
- GNIS feature ID: 1176657

Haverford is an unincorporated community located in both Haverford Township in Delaware County, Pennsylvania, United States, and Lower Merion Township in Montgomery County, approximately 3 miles (4.8 km) west of Philadelphia. The Pennsylvania Railroad (PRR) opened Haverford Station in 1880 on their Main Line west out of Broad Street Station (now Suburban Station) in Philadelphia. Haverford sits at milepost 9.17.

Haverford borders the unincorporated portion of Haverford Township called Havertown, as well as the unincorporated communities of Bryn Mawr, Gladwyne, Ardmore, Wynnewood, and a small portion of Broomall.

The Haverford neighborhood name was borrowed from the older entity, Haverford Township (established 1681) to which much of the unincorporated community belongs, as the result of a postal code address change in 1946. Haverford Township's namesake is in turn derived from the name of the town of Haverfordwest in Wales, UK.

Today, Haverford is most notable for being the site of Haverford College and one of the United States' oldest country clubs, the Merion Cricket Club.

Major roads in Haverford include Lancaster Avenue (US 30/Lincoln Highway), Montgomery Avenue, Haverford Road, and I-476 (Blue Route).

== Demographics ==
As of August 2009, the average home price in the Haverford ZIP Code 19041 was $849,000.

== Infrastructure ==
=== Public transportation ===
- Haverford - Paoli/Thorndale Line
- Haverford - Norristown High Speed Line
- Suburban Bus Routes: 105 (Rosemont to 69th Street) and 106 (Paoli to 69th Street)

== Historic sites ==
	Site name	Image	Location	Year Built	Comment
1	Allgates		Coopertown Rd	1731	Former home of Horatio Gates Lloyd
2	Federal School		Haverford-Darby Rd	1797	Early schoolhouse
3	Merion Cricket Club		325 W. Montgomery Avenue	1865	Frank Furness designed clubhouse, host of many major tennis, squash, cricket, and golf tournaments
4	Whitehall Apartments		410 W. Lancaster Avenue	1925–1926	Historic apartment building in Mission Revival architecture

== Notable people ==
- David J. Adelman (born 1974), CEO of Campus Apartments and the co-founder and chairman of FS Investments
- John C. Bogle (1929–2019), financial guru, founder of The Vanguard Group of mutual funds. He was the author of several books, including "The Little Book of Common Sense Investing" (John Wiley, 2007). In 1999, Fortune magazine named Bogle as one of the four "Investment Giants" of the twentieth century. In 2004, Time magazine named Bogle as one of the world's 100 most powerful and influential people. He was a former resident of North Rose Lane.
- Catherine Drinker Bowen (1897–1973) author and historian. She was the author of many books including "Miracle at Philadelphia: The Story of the Constitutional Convention, May to September 1787" and "The Most Dangerous Man in America: Scenes from the Life of Benjamin Franklin" (1974). She lived on Booth Lane, north of Montgomery Avenue
- Alexander Johnson ("AJ") Cassatt (1839–1906), president of the Pennsylvania Railroad from 1899 to 1906. His estate, "Cheswold," was off of Grays Lane. A bas-relief plaque showing Cassatt on horseback is located on the stone wall of the Merion Cricket Club, at the corner of Grays Lane and Montgomery Avenue. Cassatt, the brother of the American impressionist painter Mary Cassatt, was responsible for the granite curbstones which give so many roads in Lower Merion Township such charm. He also designed the distinctive green and yellow metal street signs which characterize the township.
- Herb Clarke (1927–2012), former weatherman for WCAU-TV from 1958 to 1997
- Frank Converse (born 1938), actor, former resident of Laurel Lane.
- Sophie Drinker (1888-1967), musicologist
- Theodore Freeman, aeronautical engineer, U.S. Air Force officer, test pilot, and NASA astronaut
- Clement Acton Griscom, founder and president of American Steamship Lines. His estate, "Dolobran," is on Laurel Lane. The house was designed by the famous Philadelphia architect Frank Furness, who also designed the Merion Cricket Club in Haverford. Dolobran took four years to build, encompasses a floor area of over 0.5 acres (2,000 m^{2}) on five levels and is "a priceless relic of the Gilded Age on the Main Line." (O'Loughlin, Kathy, "Frank H. Furness: Visionary architect," Main Line Times, August 19, 2010. See also Lower Merion Historical Society, "The First 300 Years: An Amazing and Rich History of Lower Merion Township.")
- Ken Henderson, former Major League Baseball player.
- Joshua Humphreys (born June 17, 1751, Haverford Township, Pa., U.S.—died Jan. 12, 1838, Haverford Township, Pa.), American shipbuilder and naval architect who designed the U.S. frigate Constitution, familiarly known as "Old Ironsides" (launched Oct. 21, 1797). Humphreys was commissioned in 1794 to design six frigates for the newly formed U.S. Navy, thus becoming the first American naval construction contractor.
- Thacher Longstreth, (1920-2003), Philadelphia city councilman, mayoral candidate, WWII veteran, speaker, author, and executive.
- John LeClair, retired National Hockey League All-Star
- Frederic Lewy, German-born neurologist, discovered Lewy bodies
- James McCrea (1848-1913), president of the Pennsylvania Railroad from 1907 to 1913
- Jameer Nelson, All-Star basketball player for the Orlando Magic. A native of Chester, Pennsylvania, he attended St. Joseph's University. He lives in Haverford during the off season (Philadelphia Magazine, "Best of Philly" issue, August 2010, page 134)
- J. Howard Pew, son of Joseph Newton Pew, the founder of Sun Oil Company. His estate, "Knollbrook," was at Grays Lane and Mill Creek Road.
- Dave Roberts, retired weather forecaster for WPVI-TV Action News
- Gunther Stent (1924–2008), molecular biologist
- Karin Taylor, actress, fashion model, Playmate of the Month in Playboy magazine (June 1996). She founded Style House in Haverford. She is currently living in Palm Beach, Florida.
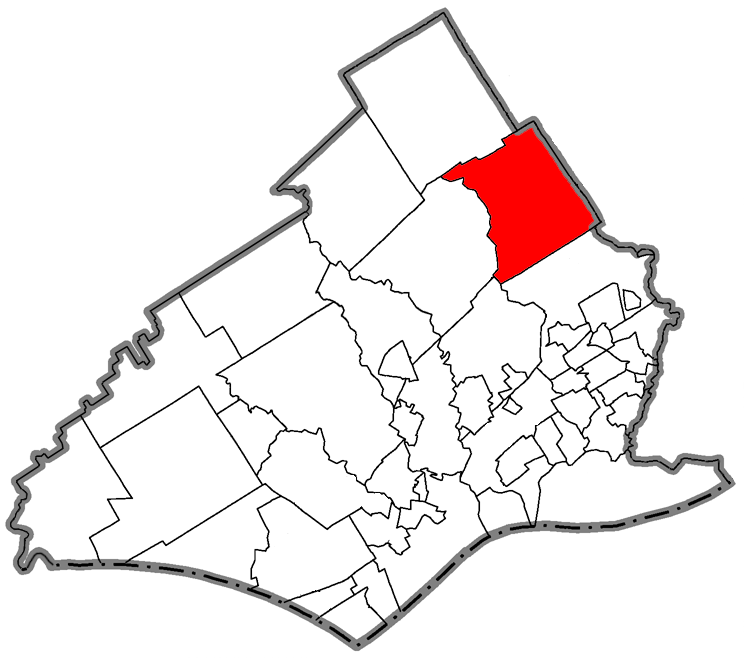
Haverford Township

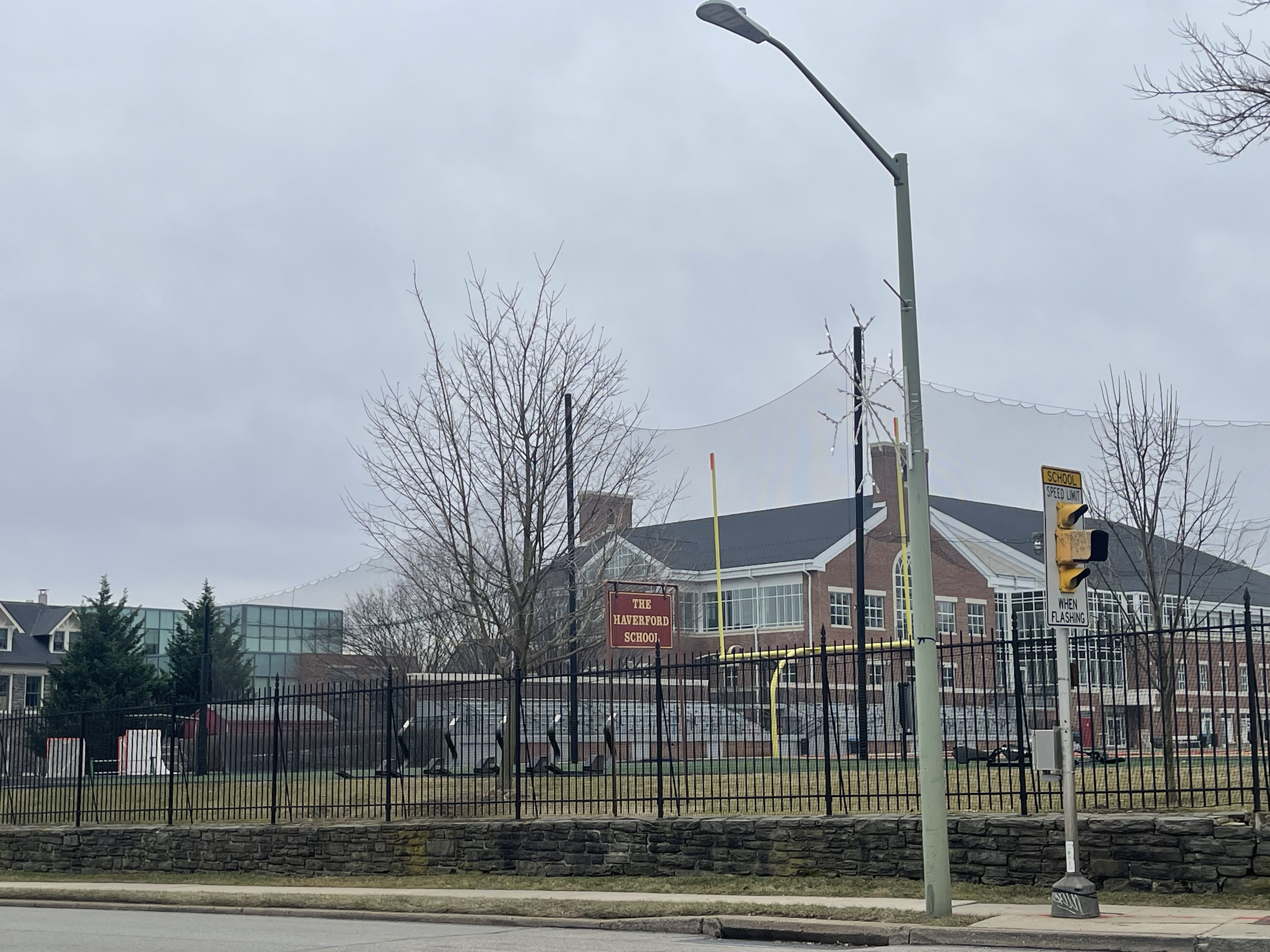
Haverford School

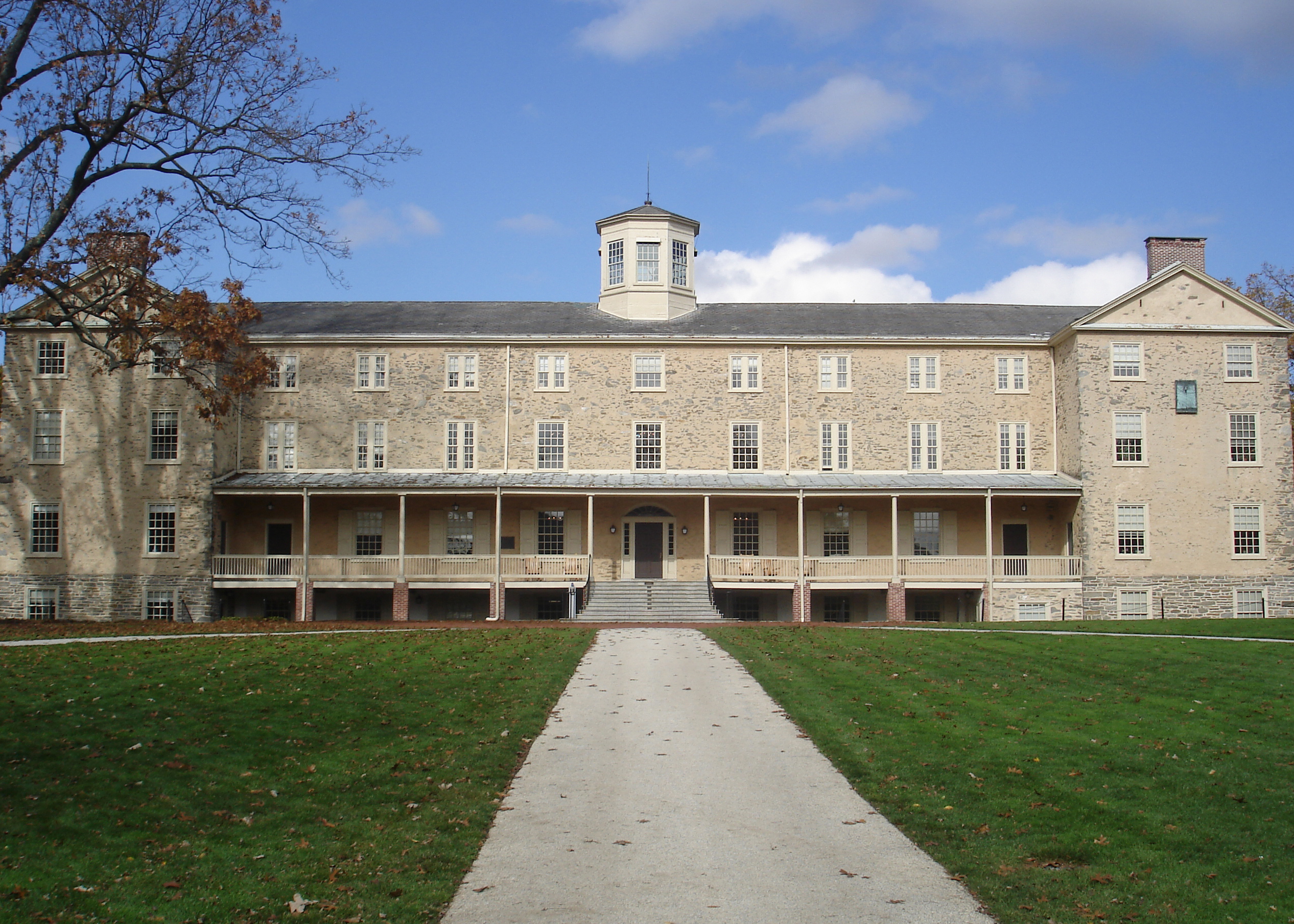
Founders Hall, Haverford College.

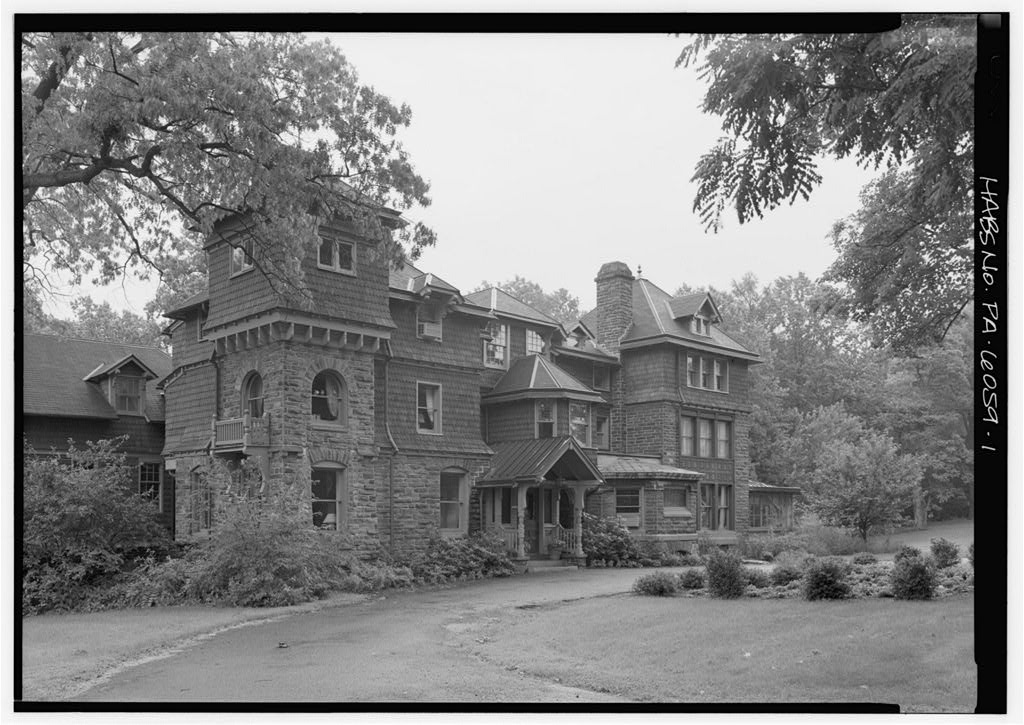
Dolobran (Clement A. Griscom mansion), Laurel Lane (1881), designed by Frank Furness

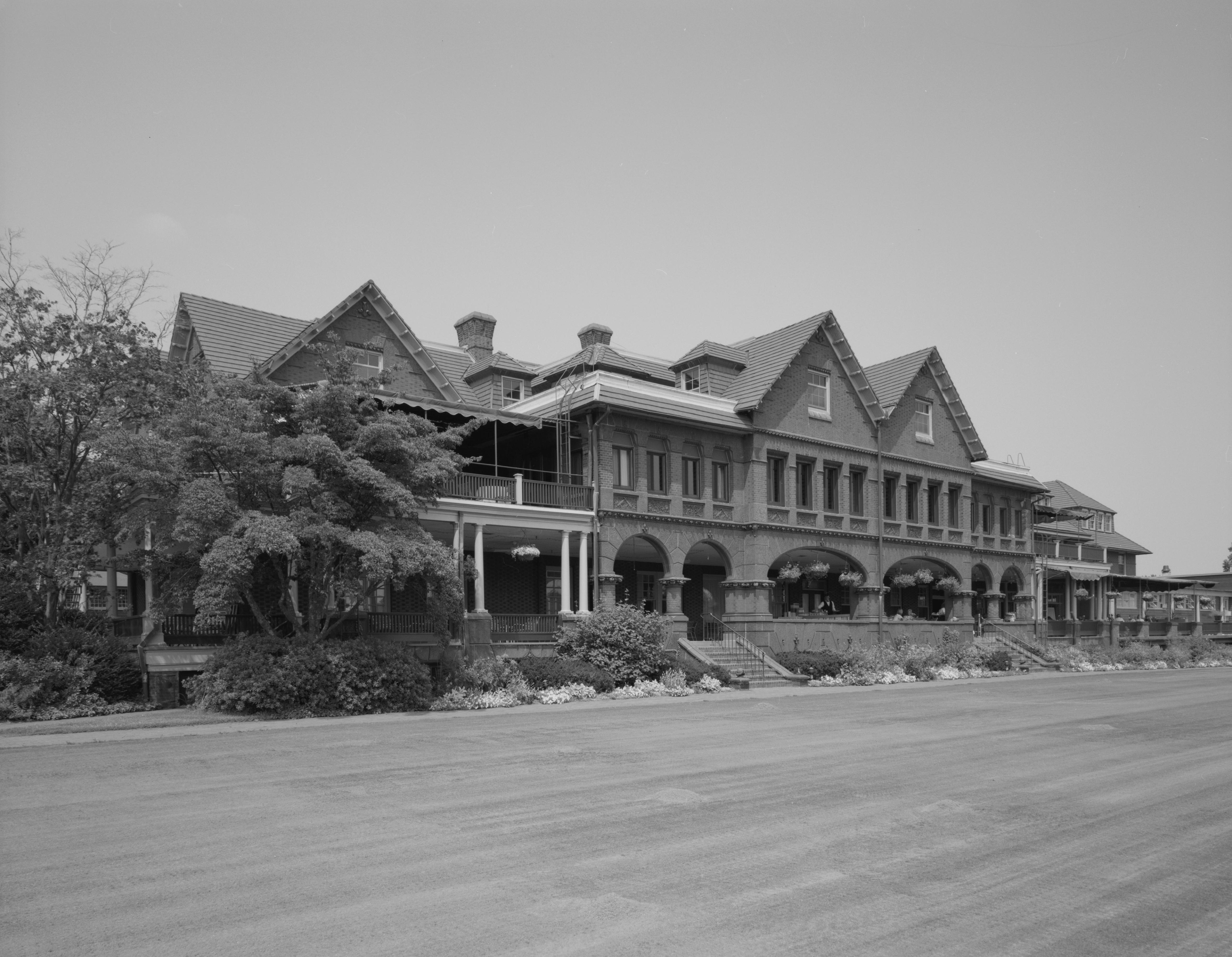
Merion Cricket Club, Montgomery Ave. & Grays Lane (1896), designed by Frank Furness

== See also ==
- Haverford Township, Delaware County, Pennsylvania
- Haverford College
- The Haverford School
- Friends School Haverford
