= Stephan Grupp =

American pediatric oncologist

Academic background
- Education: B.S. 1981, University of Cincinnati; Ph.D., 1985, MD, 1987, University of Cincinnati College of Medicine
- Thesis: Mediators and modulators of the early B cell activation pathway (1985)

Academic work
- Institutions: Children's Hospital of Philadelphia; Perelman School of Medicine at the University of Pennsylvania; Harvard Medical School
- Main interests: CAR T-cell therapy

Stephan A. Grupp is an American pediatric oncologist. He is the Chief of the Cell Therapy and Transplant Section in the Division of Oncology and Director of the Cancer Immunotherapy Program at the Children's Hospital of Philadelphia and Professor of Pediatrics at the Perelman School of Medicine at the University of Pennsylvania. In 2019, Grupp was elected a Member of the National Academy of Medicine.

He has led groundbreaking clinical trials of an innovative T-cell therapy for children with acute lymphoblastic leukemia (ALL). Grupp has developed the first highly effective childhood cancer immunotherapy and delivered CAR T-cell therapy to the first pediatric patient in the world. Grupp also helps lead trials on a CRISPR-based gene editing therapy for Sickle cell disease.

== Early career and personal life ==
Grupp was born to German immigrant parents, both physicians, in the United States. Grupp's parents, Ingrid and Gunther Grupp, were professors and colleagues with joint appointments in cardiology and cell biophysics at the University of Cincinnati. Grupp earned his Bachelor of Science degree from the University of Cincinnati and his PhD in Immunology and medical degree from the University of Cincinnati College of Medicine. Following this, he completed his Clinical Fellowship in Pediatrics at Harvard Medical School (Boston Children's Hospital) and his Clinical Fellowship in Pediatric Hematology/Oncology at the Dana-Farber/Boston Children's Cancer and Blood Disorders Center. Stephan Grupp is married to Sheryl Forste-Grupp, a local politician in Haverford Township and scholar of philology.

== Career ==
Upon completing his formal education, Grupp accepted a faculty position at Harvard Medical School until 1996 when he joined the Children's Hospital of Philadelphia (CHOP).

In 2017, Grupp was named chief of the section of cellular therapy and transplant within the division of oncology at CHOP. While serving in this role, Grupp was honored as a Citizen Diplomat from the Citizen Diplomacy International for having "traveled throughout the world to teach doctors in other countries about using this therapy to treat children and young adults with acute lymphoblastic leukemia."

Grupp was recognized by the National Academy of Medicine for "pioneering the development of an entirely novel therapy for acute lymphoblastic leukemia (ALL), and leading the first global engineered cell therapy trial that demonstrated effective sustained ALL remissions, making him a leader in cancer immunotherapy." In the same year, he was also recognized by his alma mater with the Daniel Drake Award "for outstanding achievements in biomedical science as evidenced by major significant contributions to medical research or for a distinguished career as a clinician-teacher." During the COVID-19 pandemic, Grupp collaborated with various researchers on "MIS-C different from severe COVID-19 in children." The study found that Multisystem inflammatory syndrome in children is a post-infectious syndrome distinct from Kawasaki disease and may help guide treatment decisions.

=== T-cell therapy ===
At CHOP, Grupp has led groundbreaking clinical trials of an innovative T-cell therapy for children with acute lymphoblastic leukemia (ALL). Pre clinical work began in the early 2000s, in addition to the first trials in activated T cell therapy. Clinical development in children began in 2011 when he received a $100,000 grant to continue his investigations on clinical trials for pediatric cancer research. With this grant money, along with substantial funding from the Pennsylvania Department of Health, he began Phase 1 of the CART19 trial to study an innovative clinical trial that programs the immune system to attack blood cancers. The small number of children with B cell cancers would undergo have their T cells modified to attack specific types of cancer in their B cells. In 2012, he performed the first pediatric CAR T-cell trial for acute lymphoblastic leukemia at CHOP and delivered CAR T-cell therapy to the first pediatric patient in the world. He conducted the experimental T-cell therapy for advanced B-cell leukemias and lymphomas on seven year old Emily Whitehead, the first pediatric patient in the trial. After attempting to use CTL019 therapy to treat her cancer, Whitehead became critically ill and was admitted to the intensive care unit. As a result, working with a team off scientists, Grupp injected her with a medication used to block the IL-6 receptor (tocilizumab) to treat this post-infusion illness (Cytokine release syndrome) which rapidly resolved her condition.

Following the successful treatment of Whitehead, Grupp and his research team published their findings on two pediatric patients who had a complete remission of cancer following this treatment. As a result of his medical achievements, Grupp was chosen by John M. Maris, director of the Center for Childhood Cancer Research at CHOP, to serve on the research team for his project "Immunogenomics to Create New Therapies for High-Risk Childhood Cancers." He continued to work on personalized cellular therapy and in 2014, published findings that showed 90% of children and adults with ALL who had relapsed multiple times or failed to respond to standard therapies went into remission after receiving an investigational personalized cellular therapy (CTL019). In recognition of his work, Grupp was the co-recipient of the Pennsylvania Bio’s Patient Impact Award and Frank A. Oski Lectureship from the American Society of Pediatric Hematology/Oncology.

In 2016, Grupp collaborated with colleagues in the Perelman School of Medicine at the University of Pennsylvania on their research study "CAR T Cell Therapy in Acute Lymphoblastic Leukemia and Potential for Chronic Lymphocytic Leukemia." In the study, they used immunotherapy to modify a patient’s own immune T cells. The scientists reported on the first global, multicenter clinical trial of these cells and on a separate single-center trial, the first to use a version of these cells carrying a “humanized” protein more similar to human proteins. In recognition of his efforts, Grupp won 2016 Scientist of the Year from Philly Geek Awards.

Following this, Grupp was the lead investigator of the Phase 2 trial regarding chimeric antigen receptor T (CAR-T) cell therapy which genetically modifies a patient’s immune cells to make them seek out and kill leukemia cells. After Grupp oversaw five years of clinical trials, the Food and Drug Administration approved the use of CAR-T therapy for the treatment of relapsed or refractory pediatric and young adult patients with B-cell ALL.
