= Old Haverford Friends Meetinghouse =

Meetinghouse in the United States

Coordinates: 39.990657°N 75.304655°W

Old Haverford Friends Meeting House
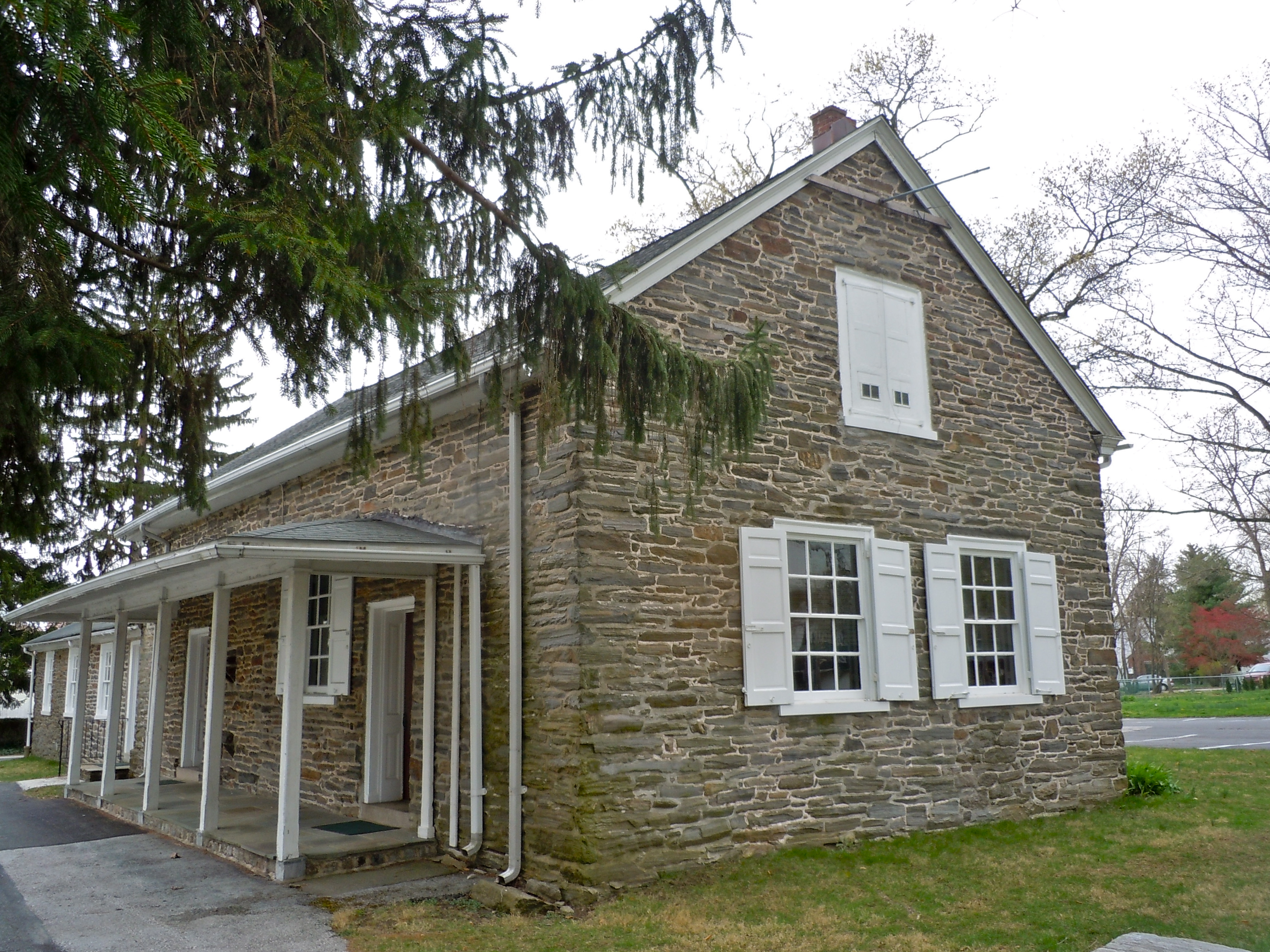
- The structure in 2011
- Old Haverford Friends Meeting House
- Location: Oakmont, Haverford Township, Pennsylvania, US
- Address: 235 East Eagle Road
- Country: United States
- Denomination: Quaker
- Website: oldhaverford.org

History
- Status: Active
- Founded: 1684; 1693 (formal charter)
- Founder(s): John Bevan, among others

Architecture
- Years built: 1684 (burial ground) 1688 (log house); 1700 (stone structure) 1800 (enlarged stonework)

Clergy
- Pastor(s): Barb Urban & Steve Loughin

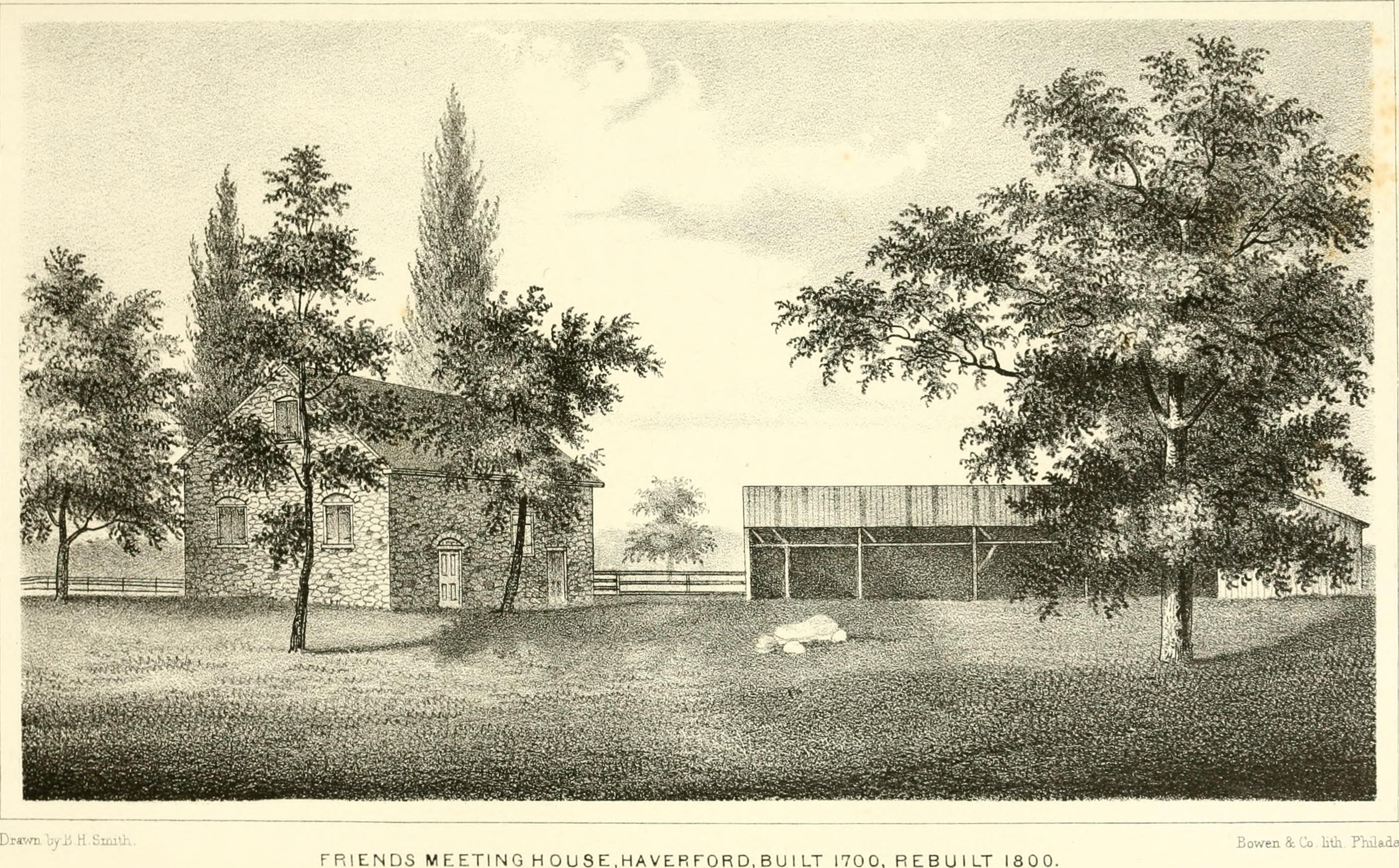
Sketch of Haverford Friends Meetinghouse from Henry Graham Ashmead book - History of Delaware County, Pennsylvania, 1862

The Old Haverford Friends Meetinghouse is a historic Quaker meeting house at 235 East Eagle Road in Oakmont, Delaware County, Pennsylvania, United States.

== History ==
The burial ground attached to Old Haverford Friends Meetinghouse was laid out in 1684. In 1688, the log meetinghouse was built. A stone meetinghouse was subsequently completed in 1700. It is believed that the southern portion of the meetinghouse, with its rougher masonry, is the original stone building. It cost an estimated £158 pounds sterling to construct (£28,873.99 in 2026). William Penn preached there soon after construction was complete and often attended worship. The northern portion of the building was expanded in 1800, being made more "commodious and comfortable."

== Congregation ==
Despite holding meetings as early 1684, the congregation was formally founded in 1693, chartered by trustees including John Bevan, who had a plaque at the location dedicated to him in 1927.

Old Haverford Friends Meeting is an active faith community and center for worship, although does not see the numbers of attendance it did in the 18th and 19th centuries.

== Sources ==
- Ashmead, Henry Graham (1884). History of Delaware County, Pennsylvania. Philadelphia: L.H. Everts & Co.
- Bevan, Ethel (1991). The Bevan Family. Mennonite Press. p. 8.
- Eckfeldt, John W. (1917). Cobb's Creek in the Days of the Old Powder Mill. A. H. Sickler Company. p. 103.
- Friends' Historical Association (1921). Bulletin of the Friends Historical Association. p. 59.
- Jordan, John Woolf (1914). A History of Delaware County, Pennsylvania, and Its People. Lewis Historical Publishing Company. ISBN 978-5-87656-902-8.
