= Grange Estate =

Historic house in Pennsylvania, United States

- The Grange
- U.S. National Register of Historic Places
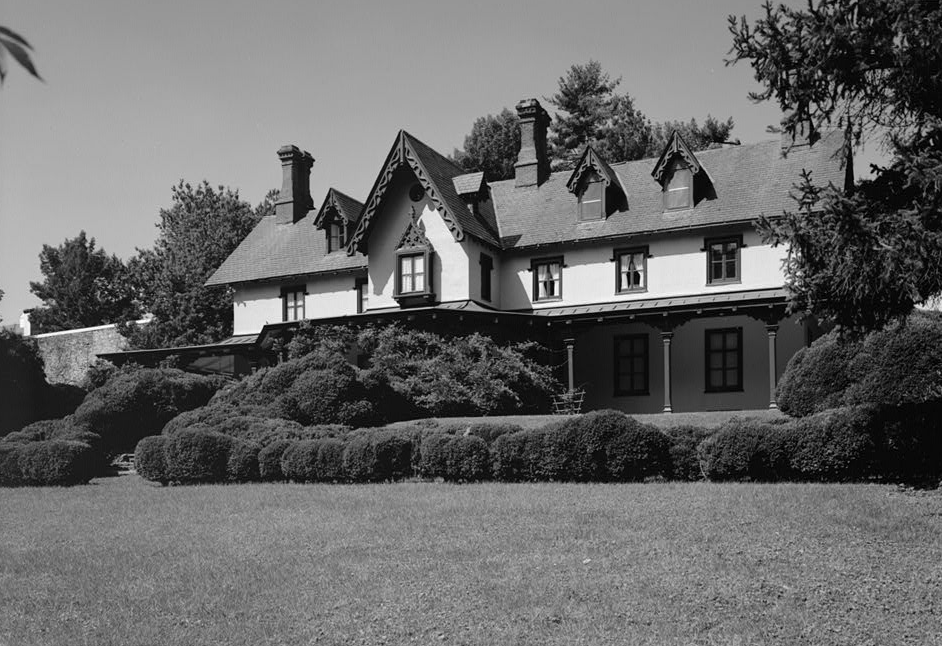
- The Grange Estate

- Location within Pennsylvania Location within the United States
- Interactive map showing the location of Grange Estate
- Location: 143 Myrtle Avenue, Havertown, Pennsylvania, U.S.
- Coordinates: 39°58′32.88″N 75°17′4.87″W
- Area: 9.9 acres (4.0 ha)
- Built: 1750
- Built by: Henry Lewis
- Architectural style: Gothic
- Website: https://thegrangeestate.net/
- NRHP reference No.: 76001636
- Added to NRHP: January 11, 1976

The Grange Estate, also known as Maen-Coch and Clifton Hall, is a historic mansion built by Henry Lewis Jr. (1671–1730) in Havertown, Pennsylvania, near Philadelphia. Parts of the residence are incorporated in the carriage house.

== History ==
The original tract of land was sold to Lewis by William Penn in 1682. The land was purchased by Captain John Wilcox in 1750, and quickly sold to Charles Cruikshank in 1761. The main house, built in c. 1750 and expanded several times through the 1850s, was, for the most part, built in additions by Cruikshank and his family, who added the various terraces, gardens, and most of the residence facing Cobbs Creek. Cruikshank's son-in-law, John Ross, coined the name 'the Grange' for the property. The building was added to the National Register of Historic Places in 1976 as The Grange.

The mansion, an example of the Gothic Revival style, is presented in the state it was in at the turn of the 20th century. The grounds also feature Victorian gardens.

The house was owned by patriot and Philadelphia merchant John Ross during the late 18th century, who named his country estate after the home of Lafayette. Ross's house was frequented by several notable historic figures, including George Washington and Lafayette.

In 1815, the house was purchased by Manuel Eyre Jr., son of Washington aide Manuel Eyre, who served with Washington during the Revolution. The Eyre family held the estate longer than any other, first from 1815 to 1846, and then, through their Ashhurst cousins, from 1848 to 1911.

The last family to occupy the mansion did so from 1913 until 1974, when the estate was purchased by Haverford Township in 1974 under the Haverford Historical Society.

The mansion is now maintained as a museum and community center. Regular tours are available from April to October and during the December holidays.
