= Allgates =

Historic house in Pennsylvania, United States

- U.S. National Register of Historic Places
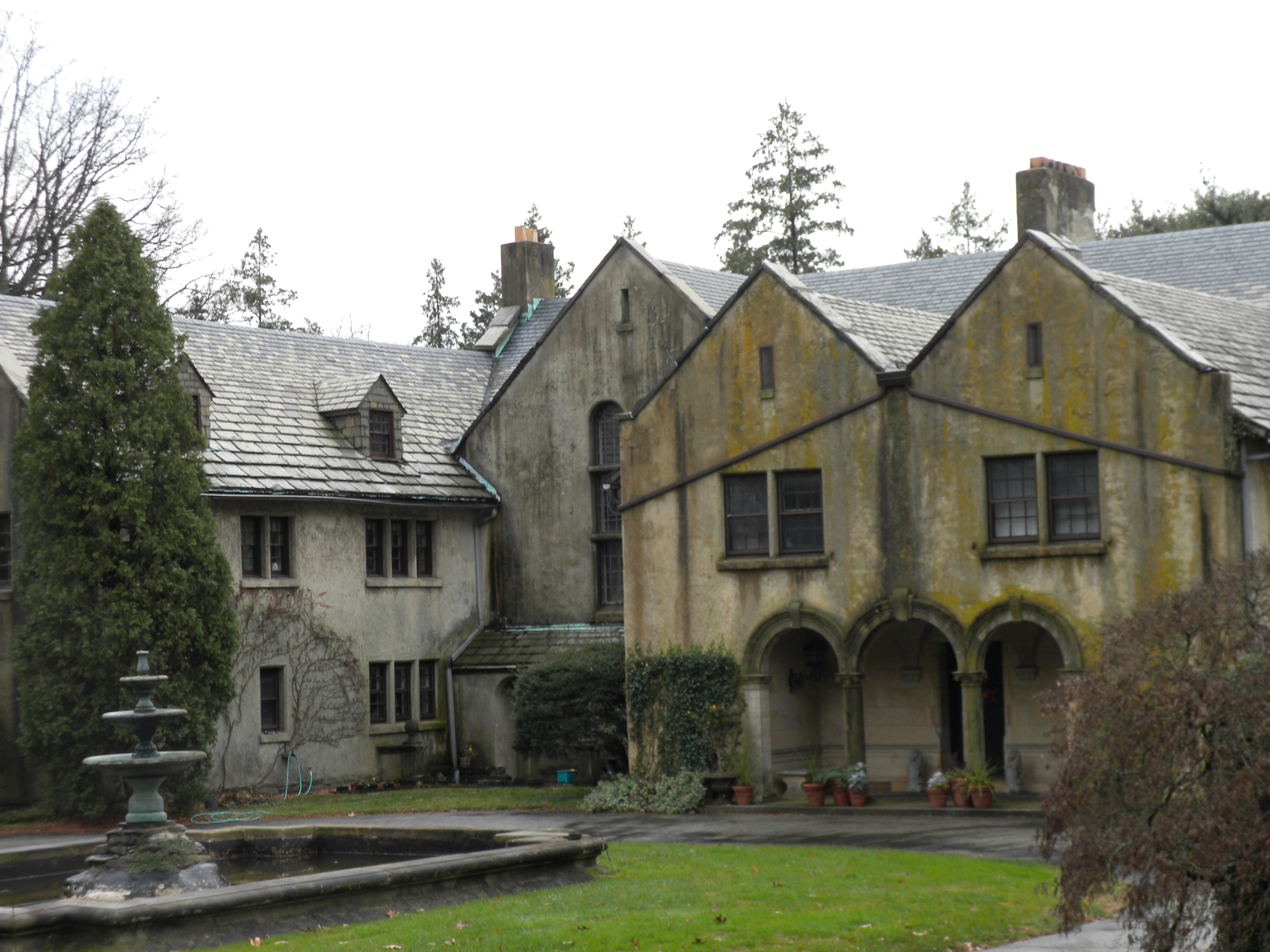
- Allgates in November 2009

- Location within Pennsylvania Location within the United States
- Location: Coopertown Rd., Haverford, Pennsylvania
- Coordinates: 39°59′54″N 75°19′36″W
- Area: 26.6 acres (10.8 ha)
- Built: 1731
- Architect: Eyre, Wilson; Sellers, Horace W.
- NRHP reference No.: 79002222
- Added to NRHP: May 15, 1979

The Allgates is a historic estate which is located in Haverford, Delaware County, Pennsylvania. It was built for financier Horatio Gates Lloyd and his wife Mary Helen Wingate Lloyd.

Much of the complex was added to the National Register of Historic Places on May 15, 1979; the Federal School was listed separately and added in 1971.

== History and architectural features ==
Built for financier Horatio Gates Lloyd, who was simultaneously a partner in Drexel and Co. and J.P. Morgan and Co. and president of the Commercial Trust Co. of Philadelphia, and his wife Mary Helen Wingate Lloyd, this large estate contained nineteen buildings, including the Frog Tavern, which was built in 1731, and the Federal School, which was built in 1797.

The Mansion House, which is the largest of the structures, was designed by Wilson Eyre and completed in 1912. The area was landscaped by the Olmsted Brothers (1911–1915). Additions to the garden were made by Ferrucio Vitale. The gardens, however, ultimately did not survive.

Since Allgates' listing on the NRHP, the estate has been developed with several new large residences. Both the Mansion House and the Federal School remain, however.

== Gallery ==
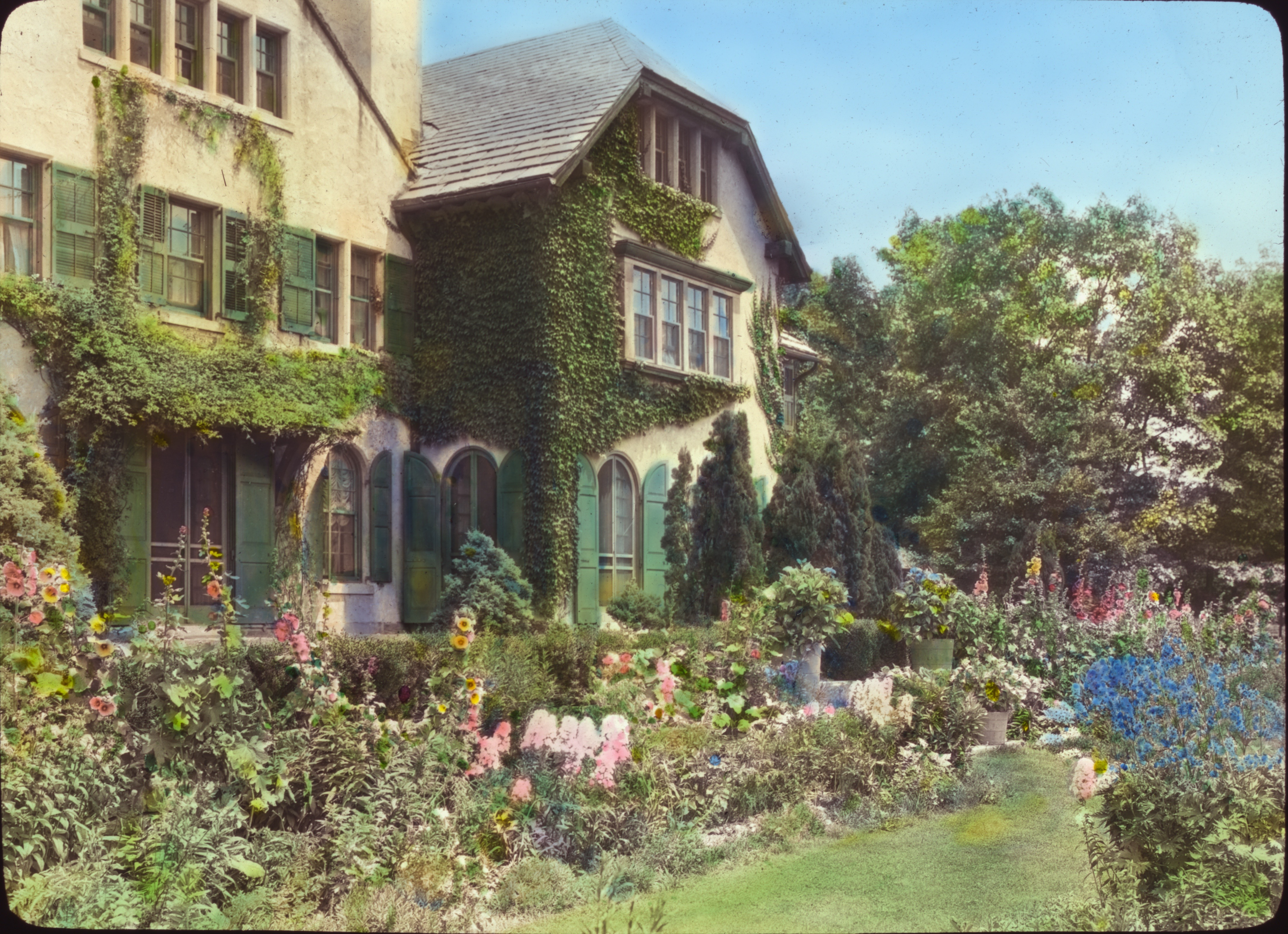

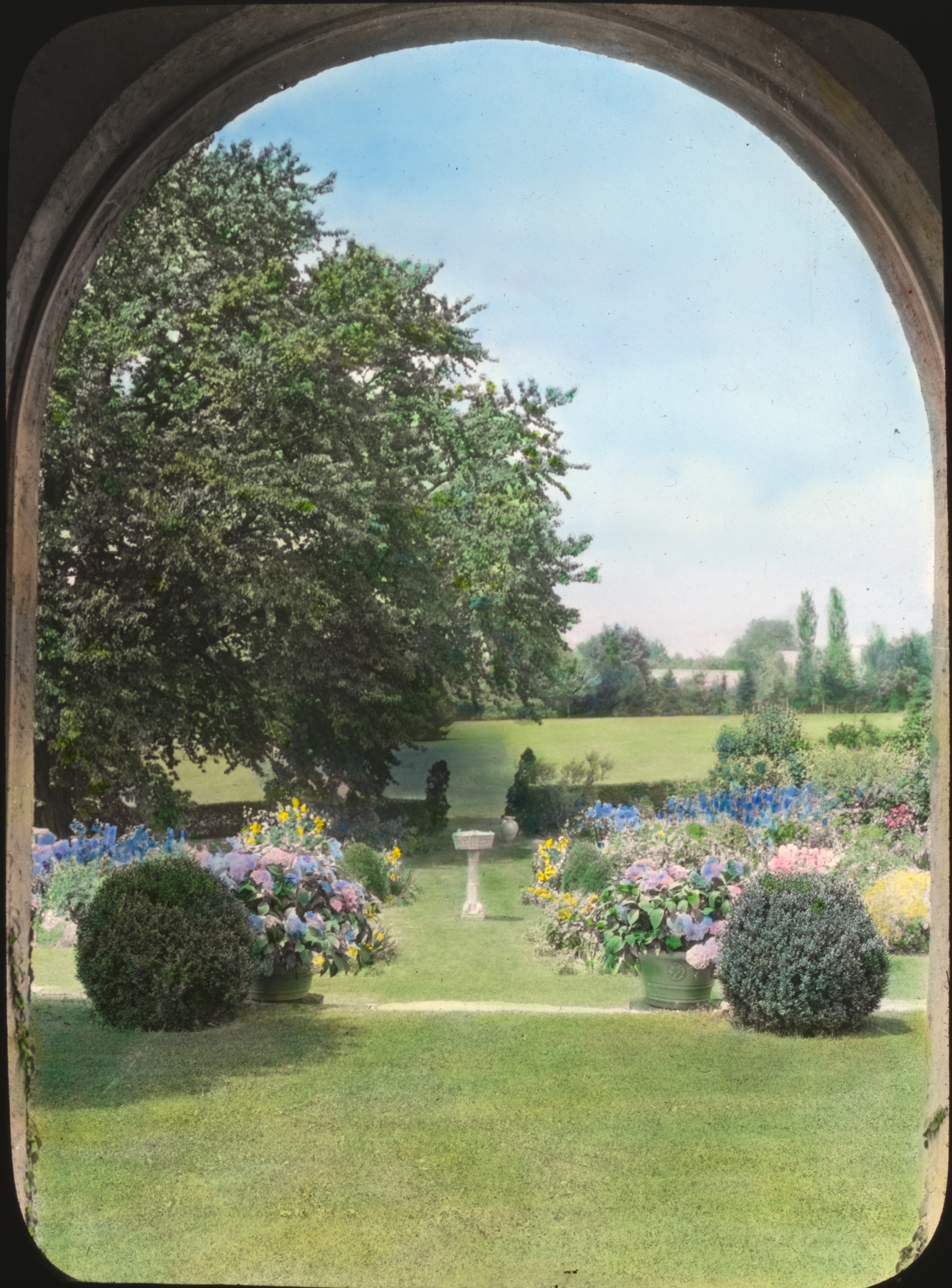

== See also ==
- National Register of Historic Places listings in Delaware County, Pennsylvania
