= Mary Helen Wingate Lloyd =

American horticulturist (b.1868 - d.1934)

Mary Helen Wingate Lloyd (1868–1934) was an American horticulturist who was a founding member of the American Iris Society and creator of a celebrated "iris bowl" garden.

Wingate was born in Brooklyn, New York (not yet a part of New York City) in 1868, one of four children of George Wood Wingate and Susan Prudence (Man) Wingate.

She married financier Horatio Gates Lloyd, Sr. (1867-1937), and redesigned the gardens on their estate, Allgates, in Haverford, Pennsylvania. The main house at Allgates was designed by Philadelphia architect Wilson Eyre, and the estate is now on the National Register of Historic Places. The centerpiece of Lloyd's landscaping was a bowl-shaped iris garden roughly 100 feet in diameter, consisting of four concentric terraces descending to a sunken grassy area with a tiled pool in the middle. By 1921, some 250 varieties of irises were planted in the bowl, with shorter irises towards the bottom. The bowl was divided into quadrants by stone staircases, and each quadrant was planted using a different color scheme, which Lloyd altered several times over the years. John Caspar Wister, the first president of the American Iris Society (AIS), held that it was "by far the finest" of the private iris gardens of the time.

She was one of the key organizers of the AIS and served as its director from 1921 to 1930. She wrote about gardening for magazines like Good Housekeeping and for the Garden Club of America's Bulletin and was for many years the editor of the bulletin's plant material department. She served as director of the GCA (1928–33) and then for one further year as first vice-president.

Lloyd died on September 23, 1934. The GCA Bulletin for February 1936 was a special memorial edition devoted to her life's work.

== Legacy ==
Lloyd amassed a small but substantial horticultural library, which was given to the University of South Carolina in 1982 after her son Richard's death. It includes some very rare 16th and 17th century botanical works and florilegia.

The Pennsylvania Horticultural Society's McLean Library in Philadelphia houses the Mary Helen Wingate Lloyd Collection of European and American horticultural publications from the 16th to the 20th centuries. The library also holds a hand-colored lantern slide of the iris bowl garden from the 1920s or early 1930s.

A different hand-colored glass lantern slide of the garden is held in the Smithsonian Institution's Archives of American Gardens.

Several dozen photographs of Allgates are held in the collection of the Winterthur Museum.
