= Federal School =

- U.S. National Register of Historic Places
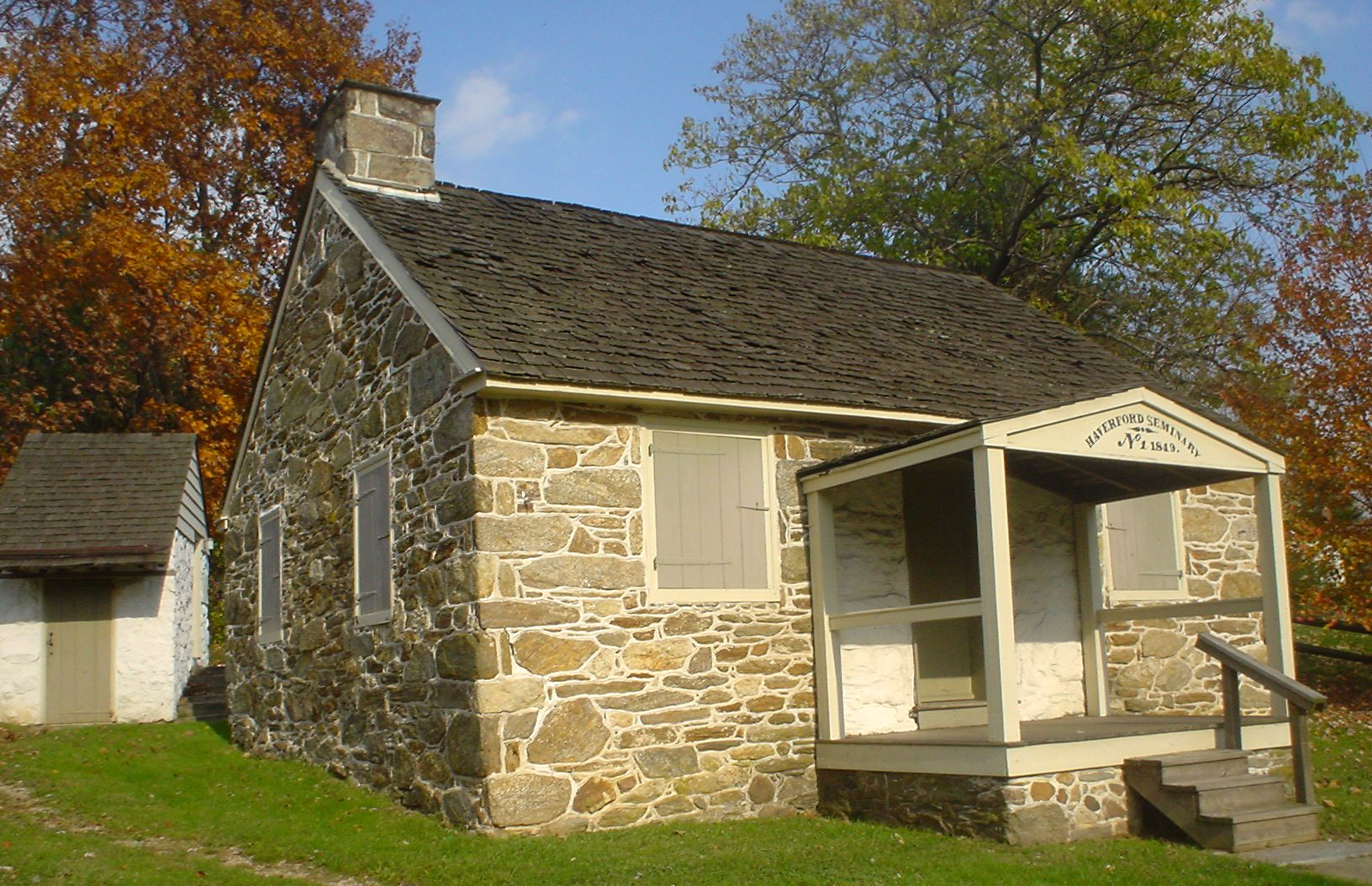
- Front of the Federal School, November 2009

- Location within Pennsylvania Location within the United States
- Location: Haverford-Darby Rd., Haverford, Pennsylvania
- Coordinates: 39°59′48″N 75°19′32″W
- Area: 1 acre (0.40 ha)
- Built: 1797
- NRHP reference No.: 71000704
- Added to NRHP: November 5, 1971

The Federal School is a historic one-room schoolhouse located on Darby Road in Haverford, Pennsylvania near the Allgates Estate. It was established in 1797, and was called the Federal School because of the community's pride of being part of the Federal United States, but not much else is known about it until 1849, when the Commonwealth of Pennsylvania purchased the building and officially renamed it the Haverford Seminary Number 1. It served as a public school from then until Horatio Gates Lloyd bought it in 1940. After his family moved out it served as a storage building. The Historical Society of Haverford Township restored it in 1991. The Federal School now has 1849 school re-enactments for 4th Graders in the School District of Haverford Township.

The building was added to the National Register of Historic Places in 1971.

== Gallery ==
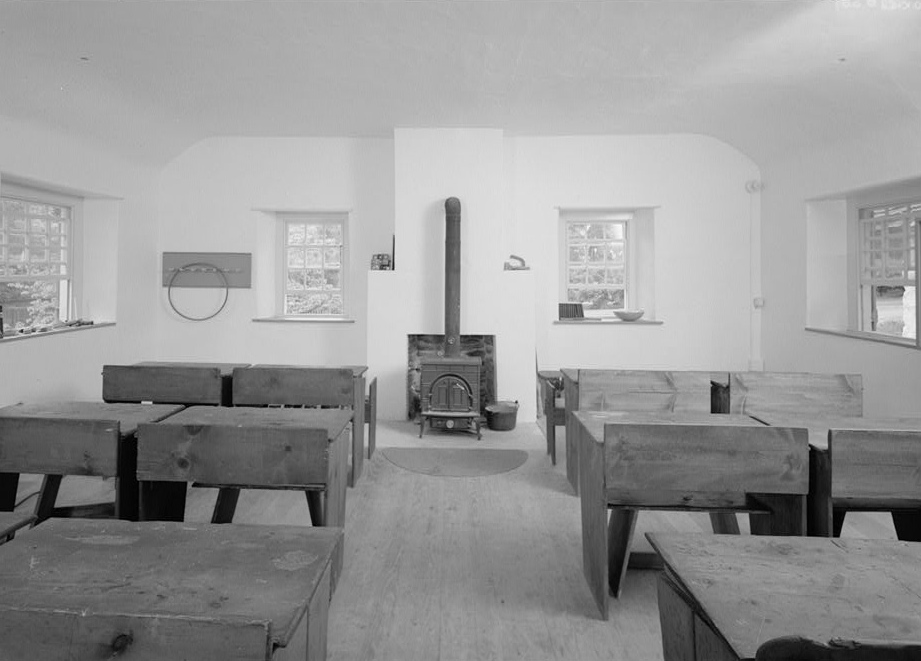
Interior of the school
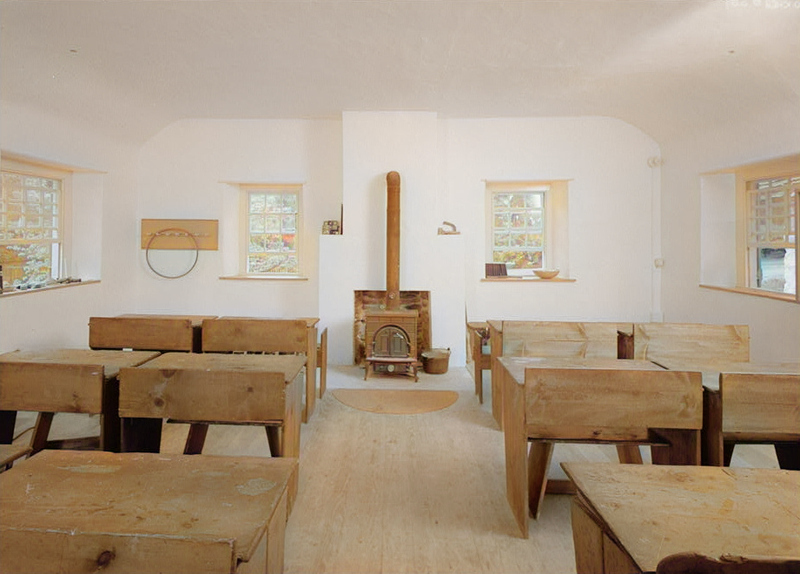
Interior of the school, Colorized
