= List of Superfund sites in Pennsylvania =

This is a list of Superfund sites in Pennsylvania designated under the Comprehensive Environmental Response, Compensation, and Liability Act (CERCLA) environmental law. The CERCLA federal law of 1980 authorized the United States Environmental Protection Agency (EPA) to create a list of polluted locations requiring a long-term response to clean up hazardous material contaminations. These locations are known as Superfund sites, and are placed on the National Priorities List (NPL).

The NPL guides the EPA in "determining which sites warrant further investigation" for environmental remediation. As of November 29, 2010, there were 95 Superfund sites on the National Priorities List in Pennsylvania. Two additional sites are currently proposed for entry on the list. Twenty-eight sites have been cleaned up and removed from the list.

== Superfund sites ==
Proposed for addition to National Priorities List
Deleted from National Priorities List

CERCLIS ID	Name	Town	County	Site Score	Reason	Proposed	Listed	Construction completed	Partially deleted	Deleted
PAD980830897	Hunterstown Road	Straban Township	Adams	48.27	Ground and surface water contaminated with VOCs and TCE.	10/15/1984	06/10/1986	09/30/2003	N/A	N/A
PAD054142781	Keystone Sanitation Landfill	Union Township	Adams	33.76		04/10/1985	07/22/1987	09/13/2004	N/A	N/A
PAD980830889	Shriver's Corner	Straban	Adams	46.13		10/15/1984	06/10/1986	01/07/2003	N/A	N/A
PAD043882281	Westinghouse Elevator Co. Plant	Cumberland	Adams	36.37		10/15/1984	06/10/1986	09/22/1998	N/A	N/A
PAD089667695	Breslube-Penn, Inc.	Coraopolis	Allegheny	50.00		10/02/1995	06/17/1996	N/A	N/A	N/A
PAD980712798	Lindane Dump	Harrison Township	Allegheny			12/30/1982	09/08/1983	09/27/1999	N/A	N/A
PAD980508816	Ohio River Park	Neville Island	Allegheny			10/26/1989	08/30/1990	09/22/1999	N/A	N/A
PAD063766828	Resin Disposal		Allegheny			12/30/1982	09/08/1983	11/20/1996	N/A	10/21/2003
PAD980508527	Craig Farm Drum		Armstrong			12/30/1982	09/08/1983	12/27/1995	N/A	09/30/2013
PAD061105128	Bally Ground Water Contamination	Bally Borough	Berks			06/10/1986	07/22/1987	05/28/1999	N/A	N/A
PAD000651810	Berks Landfill	Longswamp Township	Berks			6/24/1988	10/04/1989	12/22/2000	N/A	11/14/2008
PAD980691794	Berks Sand Pit	Longswamp Township	Berks			09/08/1983	09/21/1984	06/28/1994	N/A	N/A
PAD980831812	Brown's Battery Breaking	Shoemakersville	Berks			10/15/1984	06/10/1986	11/03/2003	N/A	N/A
PAD981740061	Crossley Farm	Hereford Township	Berks			07/29/1991	10/14/1992	N/A	N/A	N/A
PAD002360444	CryoChem, Inc.	Worman	Berks			06/10/1986	10/04/1989	09/22/1998	N/A	N/A
PAD002384865	Douglassville Disposal	Douglassville	Berks			12/30/1982	09/08/1983	07/17/2002	N/A	N/A
PAN000305679	Price Battery Lead Smelter	Hamburg	Berks			09/23/2004	04/27/2005	N/A	N/A	N/A
PAD981033459	Ryeland Road Arsenic	Heidelberg Township	Berks			03/08/2004	07/22/2004	N/A	N/A	N/A
PAD981038052	Delta Quarries & Disposal, Inc./Stotler Landfill	Antis Township, Logan Township	Blair			06/10/1986	03/31/1989	12/05/1996	N/A	N/A
PAD980705107	Bell Landfill	Terry Township	Bradford	34.79		06/24/1988	10/04/1989	02/23/1999	N/A	N/A
PAD047726161	Boarhead Farms	Bridgeton Township	Bucks	39.92		06/24/1988	03/31/1989	11/10/2003	N/A	N/A
PAD002323848	Chem-Fab	Doylestown	Bucks	50.00		09/19/2007	03/19/2008	N/A	N/A	N/A
PAD981035009	Croydon TCE	Croydon, Pennsylvania	Bucks	31.60		09/18/1985	06/10/1986	03/31/1997	N/A	N/A
PAD981740004	Dublin TCE Site	Dublin Borough	Bucks	28.90		10/26/1989	08/30/1990	N/A	N/A	N/A
PAD002345817	Fischer & Porter Co.	Warminster	Bucks			12/30/1982	09/08/1983	09/28/1998	N/A	N/A
PA6170024545	Naval Air Development Center (8 Areas)		Bucks			06/10/1986	10/04/1989	09/28/2000	N/A	N/A
PAD051395499	Revere Chemical Co.	Nockamixon Township	Bucks			09/18/1985	07/22/1987	11/02/1998	N/A	N/A
PAD980706824	Watson Johnson Landfill	Richland Township	Bucks			06/14/2001	09/13/2001	N/A	N/A	N/A
PAD980712855	Bruin Lagoon		Butler			12/30/1982	09/08/1983	03/27/1992	N/A	09/18/1997
PAD980508618	Hranica Landfill		Butler			12/30/1982	09/08/1983	05/26/1994	N/A	09/18/1997
PAD002395887	Palmerton Zinc Pile	Palmerton	Carbon	42.93		12/30/1982	09/08/1983	N/A	N/A	N/A
PAD073613663	Tonolli Corp.	Nesquehoning	Carbon	46.58		06/24/1988	10/04/1989	12/13/1999	N/A	N/A
PAD000436261	Centre County Kepone	State College, Pennsylvania	Centre	45.09	On-site soil, and on-site and off-site groundwater, sediments, and surface water contaminated with volatile organic compounds and the pesticides kepone and mirex. Polycyclic aromatic hydrocarbons detected in on-site sediments and soil.	12/30/1982	09/08/1983	N/A	11/26/2004	N/A
PAD000432661	Pennsylvania State University	State College, Pennsylvania	Centre	41.49		12/24/1988	10/08/1989	N/A	N/A	N/A
PAD004351003	A.I.W. Frank/Mid-County Mustang	Exton	Chester	42.40		06/24/1988	10/04/1989	11/08/2000	N/A	N/A
PAD980539985	Blosenski Landfill	West Caln	Chester	30.57		12/30/1982	09/08/83	09/18/1998	N/A	N/A
PAD077087989	Foote Mineral Co.	East Whiteland Township	Chester	50.0		02/07/1992	10/14/1992	N/A	N/A	N/A
PAD980691703	Kimberton Site	Kimberton Borough	Chester	29.44	Groundwater contaminated with volatile organic compounds (VOCs), including trichloroethene, dichloroethene, and vinyl chloride.	12/30/1982	09/08/1983	09/22/1993	N/A	N/A
PAD014353445	Malvern TCE	Malvern	Chester	46.69		12/30/1982	09/08/1983	N/A	N/A	N/A
PAD981938939	Old Wilmington Road Groundwater Contamination		Chester		Volatile organic compounds in the groundwater.	07/22/1999	02/04/2000	N/A	N/A	N/A
PAD980692594	Paoli Rail Yard	Paoli	Chester			06/24/1988	08/30/1990	07/12/2005	N/A	N/A
PAD002353969	Recticon/Allied Steel Corp.	East Coventry Township	Chester			06/24/1988	10/04/1989	12/14/1999	N/A	N/A
PAD000441337	Strasburg Landfill	Newlin Township	Chester	30.71		06/24/1988	03/31/1989	09/27/1999	N/A	N/A
PAD980829527	Walsh Landfill	Honeybrook Township	Chester	33.64		09/08/1983	09/21/1984	08/16/2006	N/A	N/A
PAD980537773	William Dick Lagoons	West Caln Township	Chester			01/22/1987	07/22/1987	N/A	N/A	N/A
PAD003058047	Drake Chemical	Lock Haven	Clinton			12/30/1982	09/08/1983	09/29/2000	N/A	N/A
PAD987295276	Safety Light Corporation	Bloomsburg	Columbia	70.71	massively contaminated with radiological materials	09/23/2004	04/27/2005	N/A	N/A	N/A
PAD980692487	Saegertown Industrial Area	Saegertown	Crawford	33.62	Soil, sludge, and pond sediments contaminated with volatile organic compounds and polycyclic aromatic hydrocarbons.	06/24/1988	02/21/1990	03/15/2004	10/06/1997	N/A
PA3170022104	Navy Ships Parts Control Center	Mechanicsburg	Cumberland	50.00		01/18/1994	05/31/1994	N/A	N/A	N/A
PAD980538763	Middletown Air Field		Dauphin		Wells, groundwater, and soils are contaminated with VOCs including trichloroethylene (TCE) and heavy metals such as lead.	10/15/1984	06/10/1986	09/18/1996	N/A	07/10/1997
PAD987341716	Austin Avenue Radiation Site	Lansdowne, East Lansdowne, Upper Darby, Aldan, Yeadon, Darby	Delaware		Waste disposal practices contaminated residential properties with radium, thorium, radon and asbestos	02/07/1992	10/14/1992	09/27/1999	N/A	04/18/2002
PAD987323458	East Tenth Street	Marcus Hook	Delaware		Ground and on-site lagoons contaminated with waste solvents, leaking tanks and transformers and improper management of asbestos containing debris|	01/18/1994	N/A	N/A	N/A	N/A
PAD002338010	Havertown PCP	Havertown	Delaware		Soil and ground water contaminated by oil with pentachlorophenol.	12/30/1982	09/08/1983	09/16/2010	N/A	N/A
PAD980830921	Lansdowne Radiation Site	Lansdowne	Delaware		Radium contamination of house and nearby properties	04/10/1985	09/16/1985	02/28/1991	N/A	09/10/1991
PAD980539407	Wade (ABM)	Chester	Delaware		Ground contaminated with toxic industrial waste.	12/30/1982	09/08/1983	06/29/1988	N/A	03/23/1989
PASFN0305521	Lower Darby Creek Area	Darby Township and Folcroft	Delaware and Philadelphia		Clearview and Folcroft landfill soils and seeps contained metals, polychlorinated biphenyls, and petroleum byproducts.	05/11/2000	06/14/2001	N/A	N/A	N/A
PAD980508931	Lord-Shope Landfill		Erie			12/30/1982	09/08/1983	09/30/1996	N/A	N/A
PAD980231690	Mill Creek Dump		Erie			09/08/1983	09/21/1984	09/26/2001	N/A	N/A
PAD980508865	Presque Isle		Erie		A hydrogen sulfide-containing black liquid seeped into Beach #7 at the Presque Isle State Park. The source was an unplugged natural gas well, which was subsequently plugged with cement down to 900 feet.	12/30/1982	09/08/1983	03/08/1988	N/A	02/13/1989
PA2210090054	Letterkenny Army Depot (Property Disposal Office Area)		Franklin			07/22/1987	03/13/1989	N/A	N/A	N/A
PA6213820503	Letterkenny Army Depot (Southeast Area)		Franklin			10/15/1984	07/22/1987	N/A	N/A	N/A
PAD001222025	Jackson Ceramix		Jefferson			04/27/2005	09/14/2005	N/A	N/A	N/A
PAD075993378	Aladdin Plating		Lackawanna			01/22/1987	07/22/1987	09/26/1996	N/A	11/16/2001
PAD980508667	Lackawanna Refuse		Lackawanna			12/30/1982	09/08/1983	03/28/1994	N/A	09/28/1999
PAD980712731	Lehigh Electric & Engineering Co.		Lackawanna			12/30/1982	09/08/1983	03/07/1986	N/A	03/07/1986
PAD980693907	Taylor Borough Dump		Lackawanna			09/08/1983	09/21/1984	12/31/1988	N/A	09/30/1999
PAD980538649	Berkley Products Co. Dump		Lancaster			06/24/1988	03/31/1989	09/19/2001	N/A	03/19/2007
PAD980539712	Elizabethtown Landfill		Lancaster			06/24/1988	03/31/1989	N/A	N/A	N/A
PAD980539126	UGI Columbia Gas Plant		Lancaster			06/23/1993	05/31/1994	09/24/2007	N/A	N/A
PAD003005014	Whitmoyer Laboratories		Lebanon			10/15/1984	06/10/1986	06/06/2002	N/A	N/A
PAD980508832	Dorney Road Landfill		Lehigh		Open landfill contaminated with benzene, phenol, 1,1,1-trichloroethane, and lead.	09/08/1983	09/21/1984	09/28/1999	N/A	N/A
PAD980829329	Hebelka Auto Salvage Yard		Lehigh			06/10/1986	07/22/1987	12/30/1993	N/A	09/20/1999
PAD980537716	Heleva Landfill		Lehigh			12/30/1982	09/08/1983	03/23/1999	N/A	N/A
PAD079160842	Novak Sanitary Landfill		Lehigh			01/22/1987	10/04/1989	09/17/2002	N/A	N/A
PAD980829261	Reeser's Landfill		Lehigh			04/10/1985	07/22/1987	02/05/1990	N/A	05/31/1990
PAD981033285	Rodale Manufacturing Co., Inc.		Lehigh			07/29/1991	10/14/1992	09/29/2003	N/A	N/A
PAD980692719	Voortman Farm		Lehigh			12/30/1982	09/08/1983	03/09/1989	N/A	05/31/1989
PAD980508451	Butler Mine Tunnel		Luzerne			06/10/1986	07/27/1987	09/08/2005	N/A	N/A
PAD021449244	C & D Recycling		Luzerne			09/18/1985	07/22/1987	09/30/1999	N/A	N/A
PAD003031788	Foster Wheeler Energy Corp./Church Road TCE		Luzerne			04/09/2009	N/A	N/A	N/A	N/A
PAD982363970	Valmont TCE		Luzerne			06/14/2001	09/13/2001	N/A	N/A	N/A
PAD003053709	Avco Lycoming (Williamsport Division)		Lycoming			01/22/1987	02/21/1990	09/27/2002	N/A	N/A
PAD980692537	Westline Site		McKean			12/30/1982	09/08/1983	02/22/1991	N/A	10/14/1992
PAD980712673	Osborne Landfill		Mercer			12/30/1982	09/08/1983	09/21/1998	N/A	N/A
PAD000439083	River Road Landfill (Waste Management, Inc.)		Mercer			01/22/1987	10/04/1989	12/29/1995	N/A	01/29/2004
PAD001933175	Sharon Steel Corp. (Farrell Works Disposal Area)		Mercer			03/06/1998	07/28/1998	N/A	N/A	N/A
PAD005000575	Westinghouse Electric Corp. (Sharon Plant)		Mercer			06/24/1988	08/30/1990	12/22/2005	N/A	N/A
PAD980829493	Jacks Creek/Sitkin Smelting and Refinery, Inc.		Mifflin			06/24/1988	10/04/1989	12/23/2004	N/A	N/A
PAD980691760	Brodhead Creek		Monroe			12/30/1982	09/08/1983	09/30/1997	N/A	07/23/2001
PAD981034705	Butz Landfill		Monroe			06/24/1988	03/31/1989	06/20/2001	N/A	N/A
PAD981034630	Route 940 Drum Dump		Monroe			09/18/1985	07/22/1987	09/28/1992	N/A	11/30/2000
PA5213820892	Tobyhanna Army Depot		Monroe		Groundwater contaminated with volatile organic compounds including trans-1,2-dichloroethylene, trichloroethylene, tetrachloroethylene, and vinyl chloride.	07/14/1989	08/30/1990	09/28/2000	11/16/2001	N/A
PAD000436436	Ambler Asbestos Piles		Montgomery			10/15/1984	06/10/1986	08/30/1993	N/A	12/27/1996
PAN000306939	Baghurst Drive	Harleysville|Montgomery			5/12/2014	09/22/2014	N/A	N/A	N/A	
PAD981034887	BoRit Asbestos		Montgomery			09/03/2008	04/09/2009	06/28/2018	N/A	N/A
PAD093730174	Commodore Semiconductor Group		Montgomery			01/22/1987	10/04/1989	08/24/2000	N/A	N/A
PAD980419097	Crater Resources, Inc./Keystone Coke Co./Alan Wood Steel Co.		Montgomery			02/07/1992	10/14/1992	N/A	N/A	N/A
PAD009862939	Henderson Road		Montgomery			09/08/1983	09/21/1984	10/28/1992	N/A	N/A
PAD980508766	Moyers Landfill		Montgomery			12/30/1982	09/08/1983	09/17/2002	N/A	N/A
PAD096834494	North Penn - Area 1		Montgomery			01/22/1987	03/31/1989	09/24/1998	N/A	N/A
PAD002342475	North Penn - Area 2		Montgomery			01/22/1987	10/04/1989	N/A	N/A	N/A
PAD980692693	North Penn - Area 5		Montgomery			01/22/1987	03/31/1989	N/A	N/A	N/A
PAD980926976	North Penn - Area 6		Montgomery			01/22/1987	03/31/1989	N/A	N/A	N/A
PAD002498632	North Penn - Area 7		Montgomery			01/22/1987	03/31/1989	N/A	N/A	N/A
PAD057152365	North Penn - Area 12		Montgomery			01/22/1987	02/21/1990	09/20/2000	N/A	N/A
PAD980229298	Occidental Chemical Corp./Firestone Tire & Rubber Co.		Montgomery			06/24/1988	10/04/1989	09/29/2008	N/A	N/A
PAD039017694	Raymark		Montgomery			06/24/1988	10/04/1989	09/14/1995	N/A	N/A
PAD980693204	Salford Quarry		Montgomery			04/01/1997	09/23/2009	N/A	N/A	N/A
PAD014269971	Stanley Kessler		Montgomery			12/30/1982	09/08/1983	11/02/1998	N/A	N/A
PAD980692024	Tysons Dump		Montgomery			09/08/1983	09/21/1984	12/22/1997	N/A	N/A
PAD987277837	Willow Grove Naval Air & Air Reserve Station		Montgomery			08/23/1994	09/29/1995	N/A	N/A	N/A
PAD980691372	MW Manufacturing		Montour			10/15/1984	06/10/1986	09/28/2005	N/A	N/A
PAD002390748	Hellertown Manufacturing Co.		Northampton			01/22/1987	03/31/1989	09/27/1996	N/A	N/A
PAD980508493	Industrial Lane		Northampton			09/08/1983	09/21/1984	06/29/1999	N/A	N/A
PAD980552913	Enterprise Avenue		Philadelphia			12/30/1982	09/08/1983	03/07/1986	N/A	03/07/1986
PASFN0305549	Franklin Slag Pile (MDC)		Philadelphia			09/13/2001	09/05/2002	N/A	N/A	N/A
PAD046557096	Metal Banks		Philadelphia			12/30/1982	09/08/1983	N/A	N/A	N/A
PAD981939200	Publicker Industries Inc.		Philadelphia			05/05/1989	10/04/1989	12/02/1997	N/A	11/01/2000
PAD077098770	Community College of Philadelphia		Philadelphia							
PAD980830533	Eastern Diversified Metals		Schuylkill			06/10/1986	10/04/1989	09/16/2008	N/A	N/A
PAD980712616	McAdoo Associates		Schuylkill			12/30/1982	09/08/1983	09/26/1995	N/A	12/13/2001
PAD982366957	Metropolitan Mirror and Glass		Schuylkill			02/07/1992	10/14/1992	09/30/1998	N/A	08/16/2005
PAD003047974	Bendix Flight Systems Division		Susquehanna			09/18/1985	07/22/1987	09/30/1996	N/A	N/A
PAD041421223	AMP, Inc. (Glen Rock Facility)		York			06/24/1988	10/04/1989	12/14/1995	N/A	10/02/1996
PAD980690549	East Mount Zion		York			09/08/1983	09/21/1984	02/04/1999	N/A	N/A
PAD980539068	Modern Sanitation Landfill		York			10/15/1984	06/10/1986	10/20/2000	N/A	N/A
PAD980692420	Old City of York Landfill		York			12/30/1982	09/08/1983	09/27/1996	N/A	N/A
PAD980830715	York County Solid Waste/Refuse Landfill		York			04/10/1985	07/22/1987	09/29/1995	N/A	02/14/2005

== See also ==
- List of Superfund sites in the United States
- List of environmental issues
- List of waste types
- TOXMAP
