= Havertown Superfund =

Superfund site in Pennsylvania

Havertown PCP
- Superfund site
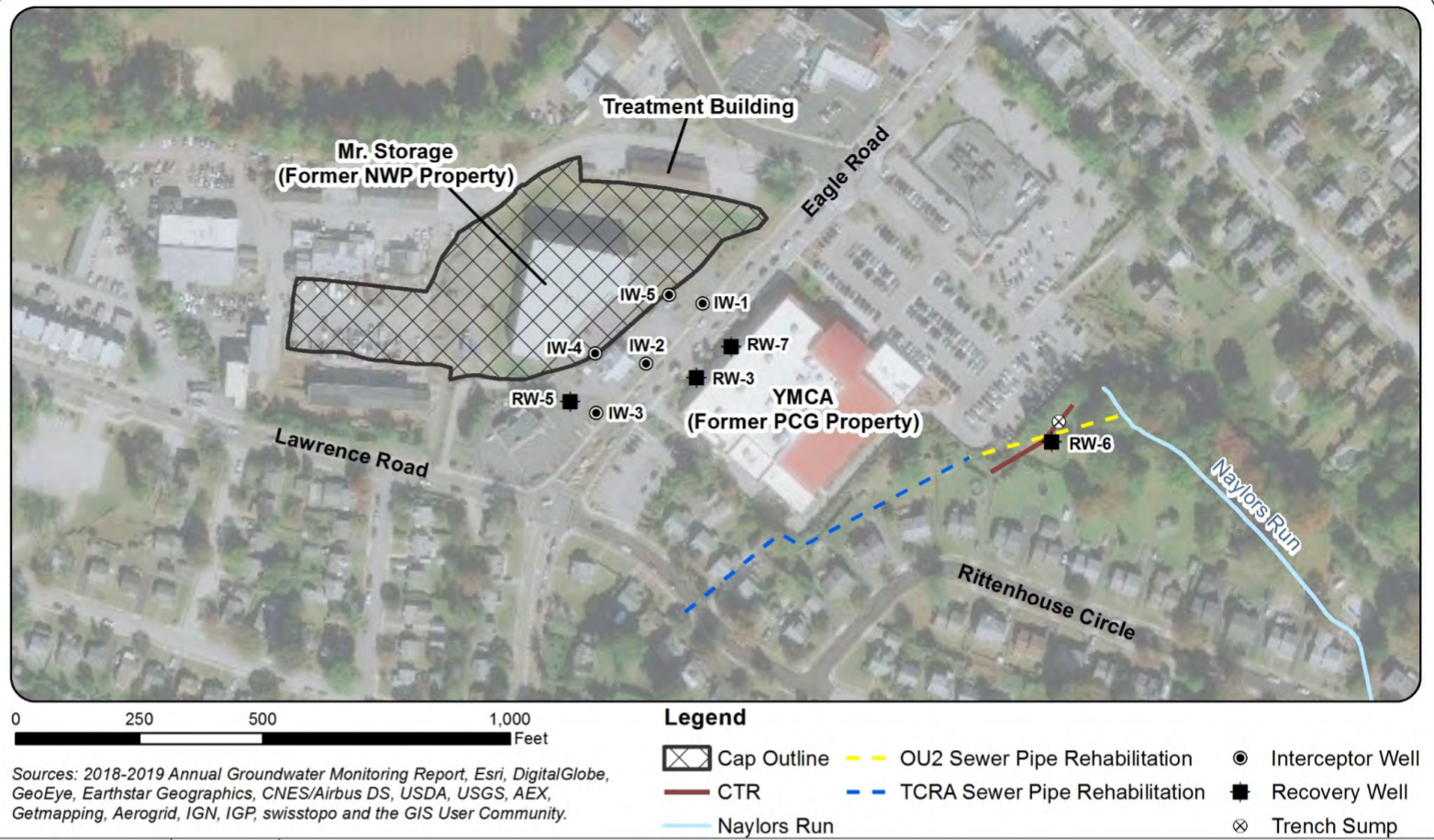
- Aerial view of Havertown PCP Superfund Site

- Location within Pennsylvania
- Location: Haverford Township, Delaware County, Pennsylvania; 39°58′51″N 75°18′31″W

Information
- CERCLIS ID: PAD002338010
- Contaminants: arsenic, benzene, copper chromate, creosote, dioxins, naphthalene, Pentachlorophenol (PCP), polycyclic aromatic hydrocarbons, trichloroethylene and volatile organic compounds (VOCs)
- Responsible parties: National Wood Preservers

Progress
- Proposed: December 30, 1982
- Listed: September 8, 1983

Havertown Superfund is a 13-acre polluted groundwater site in Havertown, Pennsylvania contaminated by the dumping of industrial waste by National Wood Preservers from 1947 to 1991. The state first became aware of the pollution in 1962 and initiated legal action against the owners in 1973 to force them to cleanup the site. The Environmental Protection Agency (EPA) ranked the site the eighth worst cleanup project in the United States. The site was added to the National Priorities List in 1983 and designated as a Superfund cleanup site in the early 1990s. Remediation and monitoring efforts are ongoing and the EPA transferred control of the site to the Pennsylvania Department of Environmental Protection in 2013.

The site was deemed to be "short-term protective of human health and the environment" in the sixth five-year report conducted by the EPA in 2020.

== History ==
The Havertown Superfund site was first developed as a railroad storage yard for the Newtown Square Branch and was subsequently used as a lumberyard. In 1947, National Wood Preservers (NWP) was founded by Samuel T. Jacoby on the land leased from Clifford Rogers.

NWP operated a wood preservation treatment plant at the intersection of Eagle Road and West Hillcrest Avenue in Havertown, Pennsylvania from 1947 to 1991. During its operations in the treatment of wood, hazardous chemicals such as arsenic, benzene, copper chromate, creosote, dioxins, naphthalene, pentachlorophenol (PCPs), polycyclic aromatic hydrocarbons and volatile organic compounds (VOCs) were created as waste products. The PCP and oil mixture used to treat wood contaminated the ground as it fell from drying wood and NWP disposed of waste products, untreated, into a 25 to 35 foot deep well on the site. Between 1947 and 1963, approximately 1 million gallons of chemicals were disposed of in the well. These chemicals fed directly into Naylors Run which leads to Cobbs Creek, Darby Creek and eventually into the Delaware River.

In 1962, the Pennsylvania Department of Health discovered pollution leaking into Naylors Run and attributed it to NWP's waste disposal practices after receiving complaints from local residents about an oily substance being discharged from a sewer pipe. Both local and federal government bodies attempted to force NWP to stop their dumping and clean up the existing pollution.

In 1963, Jacoby sold NWP to Allan and Morris Goldstein.

In 1977, NWP discontinued the use of oil and PCP to treat wood products and switched to a technique that used metal salts instead.

== Legal action and clean-up ==
In 1972, PCPs and fuel oil were detected in a well on the NWP property drilled by the Pennsylvania Department of Environmental Protection (PADEP) and the Pennsylvania Department of Transportation. The PADEP ordered NWP to conduct a cleanup of the contamination but it never occurred.

In 1973, State authorities started legal procedures to require NWP and other surrounding private companies to clean up the wastes that contaminated the area. This litigation ended seven years later in a ruling that NWP was required to clean the site.

In 1976, amidst the continuing litigation, the Environmental Protection Agency (EPA) took emergency action under section 311 of the Clean Water Act at the site by drilling wells and pumping pentachlorophenol to the surface for treatment. During this time, the owners were uncooperative with the EPA which led to its addition to the National Priorities List on September 8, 1983, for clean up.

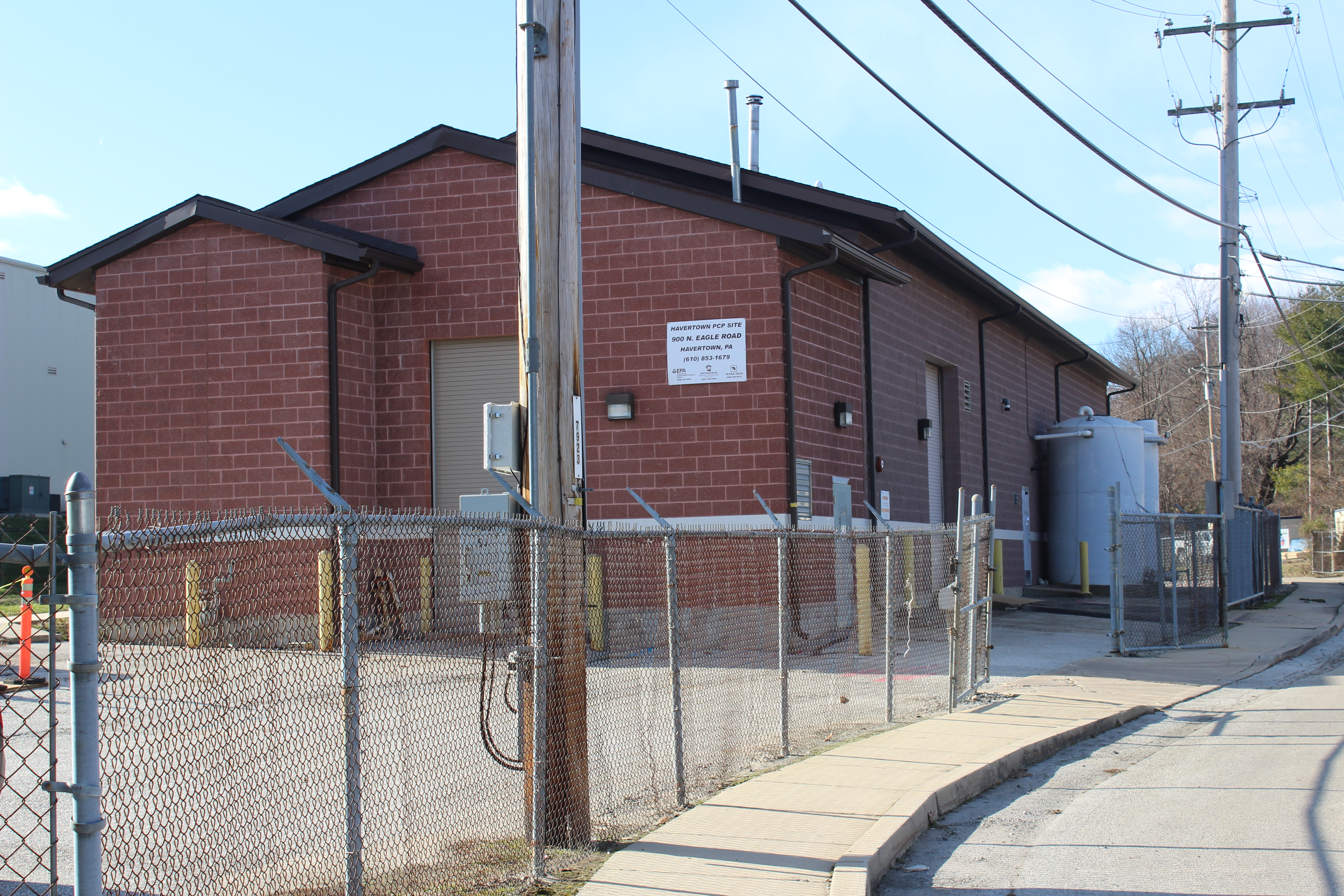
Havertown PCP Superfund Site Groundwater Treatment Plant in 2020

In 1983, a short term cleanup was conducted by NWP.

In 1987, the EPA installed a fence to restrict access to the site and sponge-like barriers to restrict waste from entering Naylors Run.

In 1989, the EPA issued the first of three Record of Decisions (RODs) which identified initial remedies for cleaning up the site. These actions included installation of a catch-basin and oil/water separator for the storm drain effluent into Naylors Run and removal and proper disposal of drummed waste material on the site.

In 1991, NWP no longer retained ownership of the site. The responsibility of cleaning up the site was given to state and federal agencies. The EPA signed a second ROD which selected an interim remedy for the shallow aquifer contamination emanating from the site. These actions included installation of recovery wells on the site, rehabilitation of a storm sewer line to prevent further infiltration of contaminants, installation of a groundwater collection trench and a groundwater treatment plant. 12,000 pounds of solid waste and 400 gallons of liquid waste were removed from the site.

In 1992, 97,000 tons of liquids, 55 gallons of solids and 60 tons of sludge, all contaminated by hazardous wastes, were removed from the site. The cleaning continued with the removal of dozens of contaminated containers and the demolition of the wood treatment building.

In 1993, the EPA removed and disposed of 275 55-gallon drums of waste, over 47,000 gallons of liquid waste and 100 gallons of sludge.

In 1997, a synthetic geomembrane cap covered with 18 inches of soil was placed on 3 acres of the site to reduce exposure to the contaminated soil. An additional 4 to 10 feet of soil was placed on top of the cap and covered with seed, mulch and fertilizer.

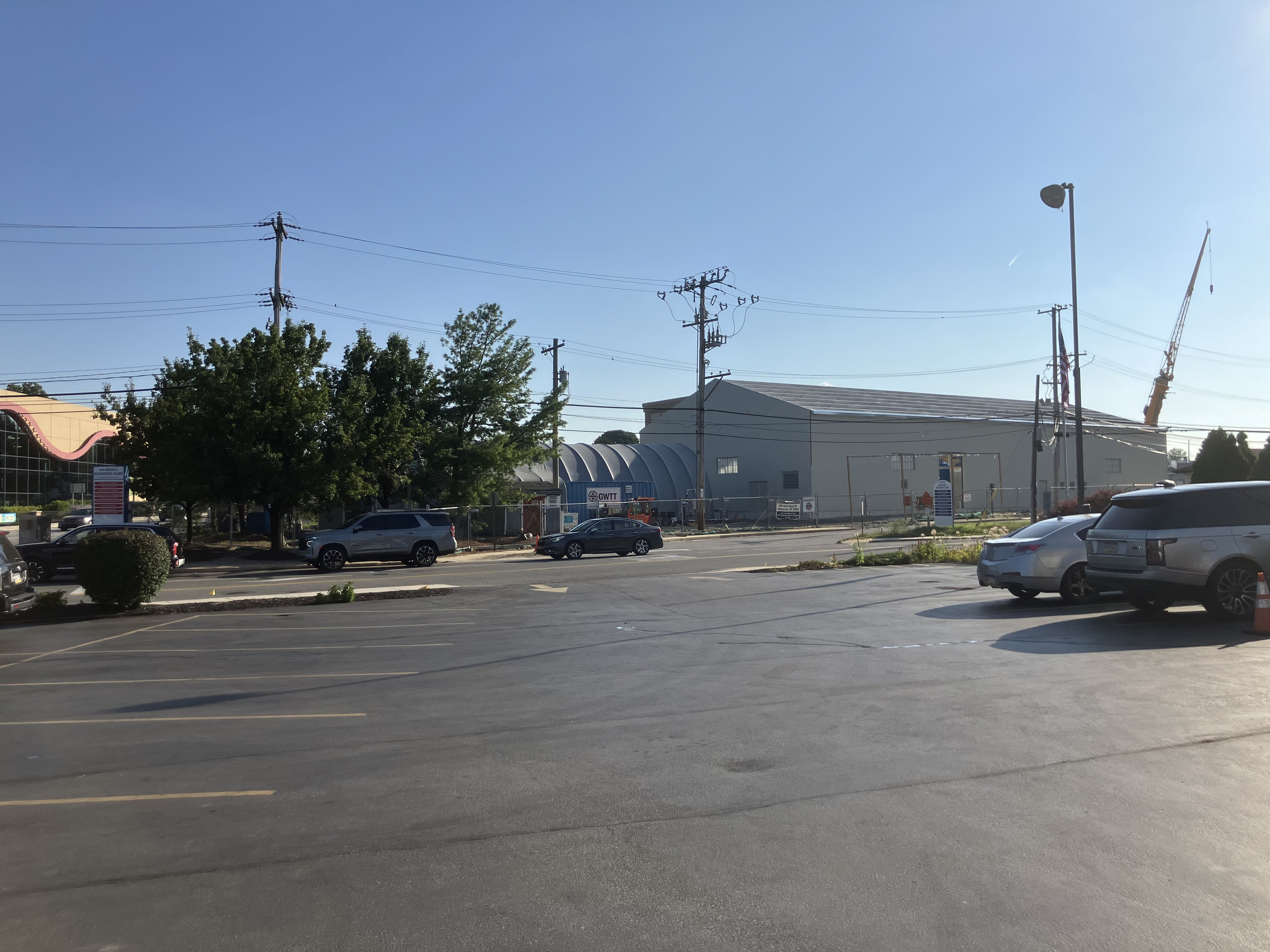
The Havertown Superfund Treatment Site from the Young's Produce parking lot, on Hillcrest Ave, in 2025

In 2001, a groundwater treatment building was operational on the site.

In 2003 the EPA installed the recovery wells and the subsurface drain on the site.

In 2004, a previously unknown, abandoned sanitary sewer line was sealed to prevent further contamination of soil and water.

In 2008, the EPA issued a third ROD to address groundwater contamination and the recreation and open space area of the site. The actions from the second ROD were combined into the third ROD. Additional actions implemented include upgrades to the groundwater treatment plant and installation of a deep groundwater recovery well.

In 2009, the groundwater treatment plant was expanded and the contaminated water treatment rate increased to 70 gallons per minute.

In 2011, trichloroethylene, a chemical commonly used to degrease metal parts, was discovered in the groundwater at the site and additional wells were installed in order to conduct a vapor intrusion study to ensure that the chemical did not volatilize and cause additional exposure.

In 2013, the EPA transferred control of the site to the PADEP.

== Current status ==
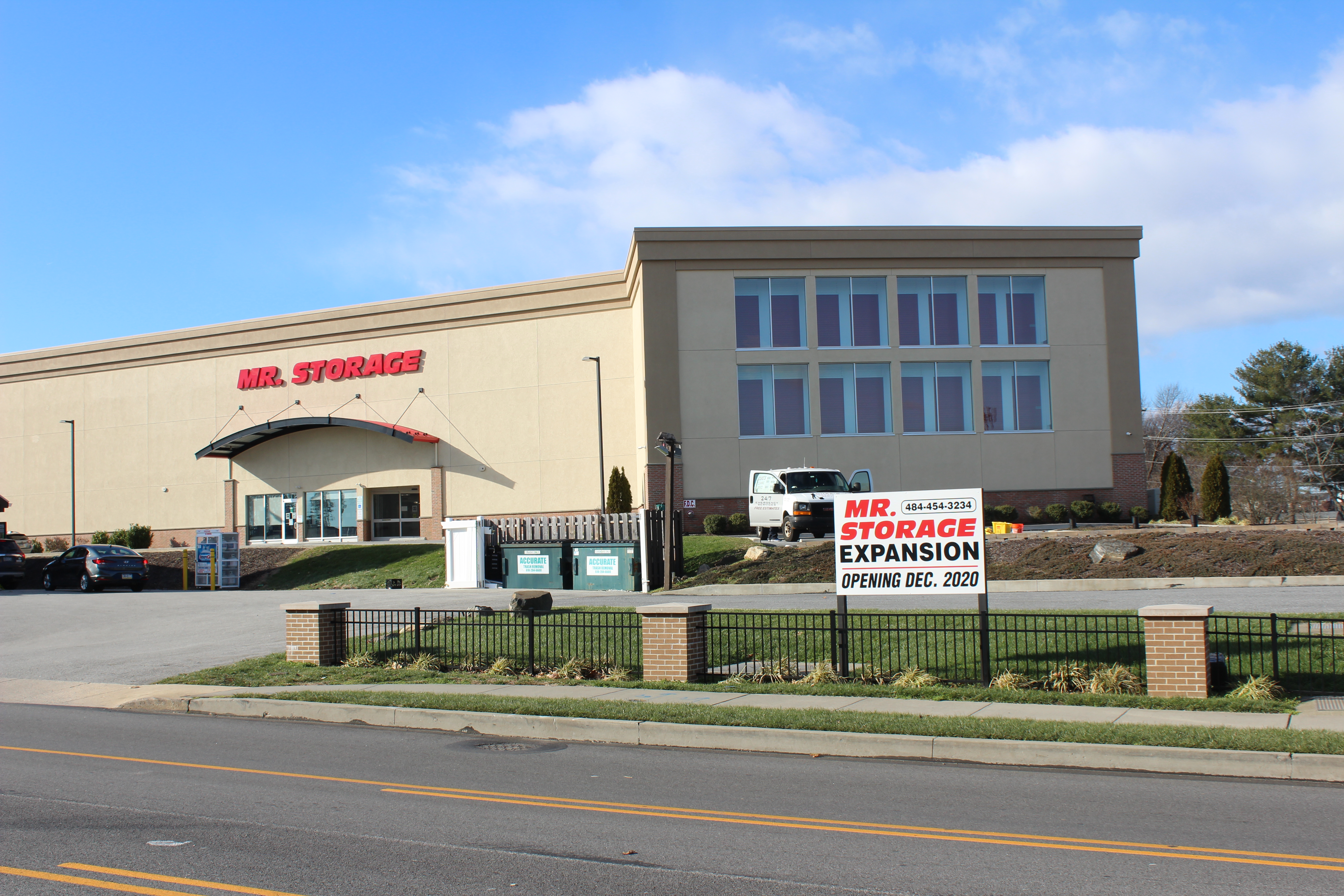
Self storage Unit built on the remediated Havertown PCP Superfund site

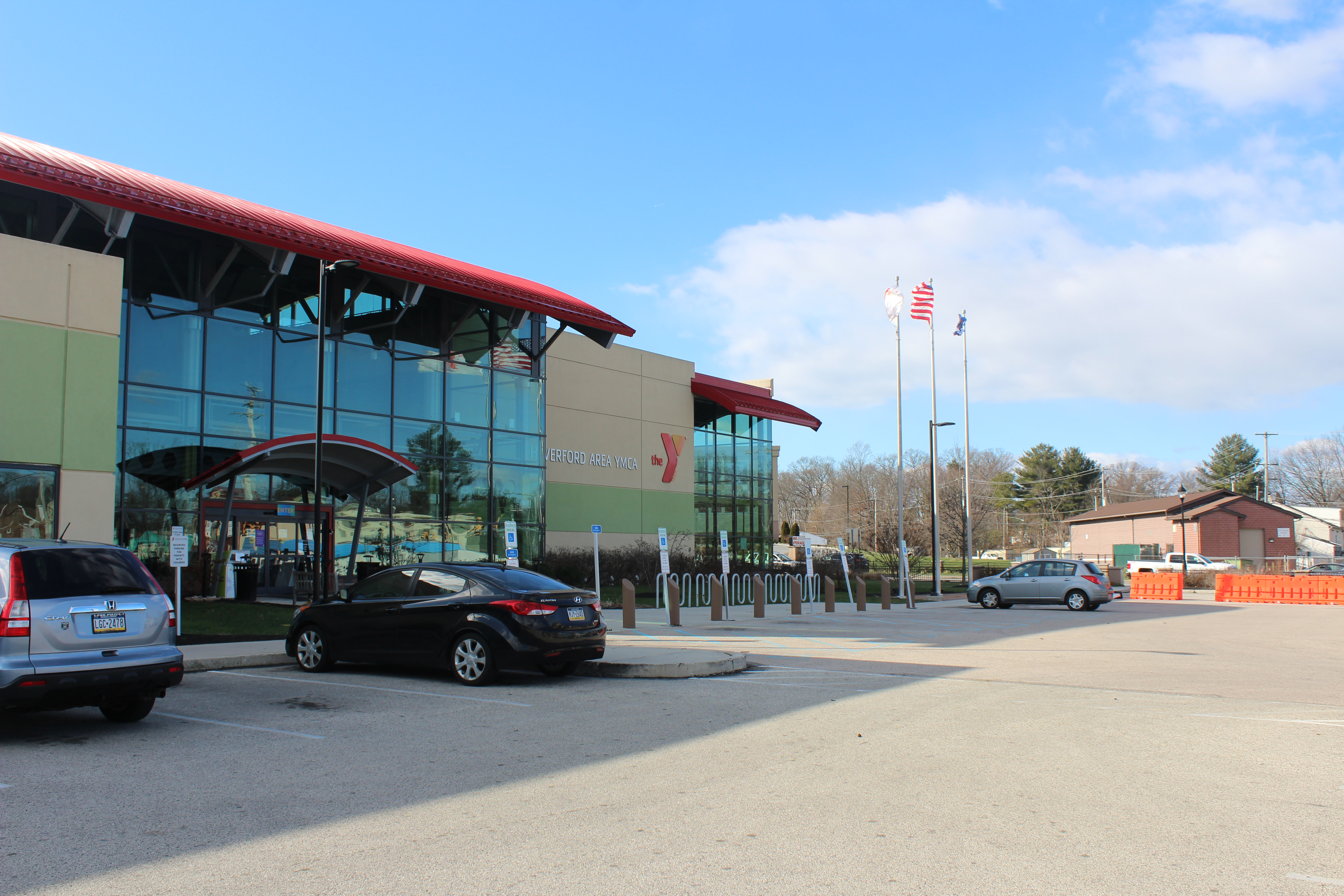
Haverford Area YMCA built on the remediated Havertown PCP Superfund site. The groundwater treatment plant can be seen across the street

The site was deemed to be "short-term protective of human health and the environment" in the sixth five-year report conducted by the EPA in 2020. Approximately 26,000 people live within one mile of the site but there are no known uses of groundwater within that mile. The residents near the site are all on the public water supply.

In 2013 a YMCA facility was built over part of the site and in 2015 a self storage facility was built over another part of the site. Treatment of contaminated groundwater and monitoring of the site are ongoing.

== See also ==
- List of Superfund sites in Pennsylvania
