= Lawrence Cabin =

Coordinates: 39.9815°N 75.2828°W

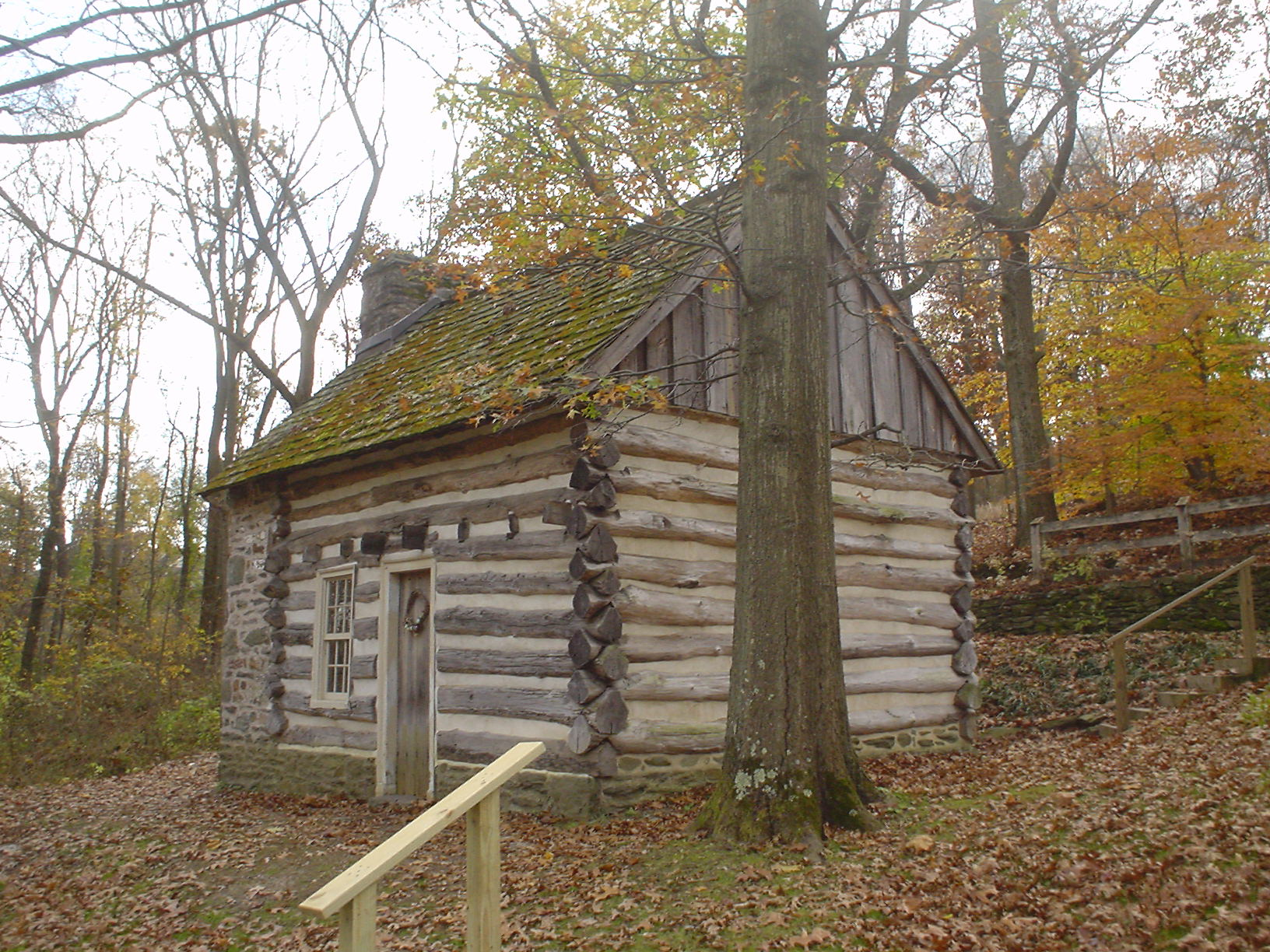
Lawrence Cabin

The Lawrence Cabin is a log cabin located on Cobbs Creek in Powder Mill Valley Park in Havertown, Pennsylvania, near Nitre Hall.

== History ==
Lawrence Cabin was built by Henry Lawrence and his family sometime around 1710 on land purchased from William Penn in 1709. It was originally modelled based on log cabins of Swedish settlers to the area.

A small log house, it is typical of the first homes originally built on the bank of Darby Creek at Old West Chester Pike by four early settlers, including David Lawrence. One of the early Welsh settlers in Haverford Township, David Lawrence emigrated with his wife Elinor Ellis and her family in 1684, and took up part of his father-in-law's land grant. His son Henry Lawrence then purchased 209 acres (0.85 km^{2}) along Darby Creek in 1709. It has not been determined whether the log house pre-dates this purchase but a 2½ story stone addition was built circa 1730, and later a clapboard summer kitchen was added. It became known as the Three Generation House, and remained in Lawrence family ownership until 1942.

A large fireplace dominates the first floor room of Henry Lawrence's structure (Lawrence Cabin), with a ladder leading to the sleeping loft.

Originally located on Darby Creek, it was moved and rebuilt at Karakung Drive (Powder Mill Valley) 1961 by the Haverford Township Park Commission when threatened with destruction. The building was officially dedicated and reopened on 7 October 1961. Various tours and fundraising events occurred throughout the 1960s in order to raise funds to continue renovation and restoration of the building. 1966 saw the donation of a colonial wool-spinning wheel to the Cabin by the Pennsylvania Historical and Museum Commission, courtesy of the Landis Valley Museum.

== Modern usage ==
Lawrence Cabin, along with Nitre Hall, are both utilized for the Colonial Living Experience provided by The Haverford Township Historical Society for elementary school students; the house is furnished appropriately in the period before 1750. Both sites are also available to be viewed by locals during the Haverford Heritage Festival (est. 1965), where local vendors sell food and trinkets.
