= Naylors Run =

River in Pennsylvania, United States

Coordinates: 39°57′04″N 75°15′04″W

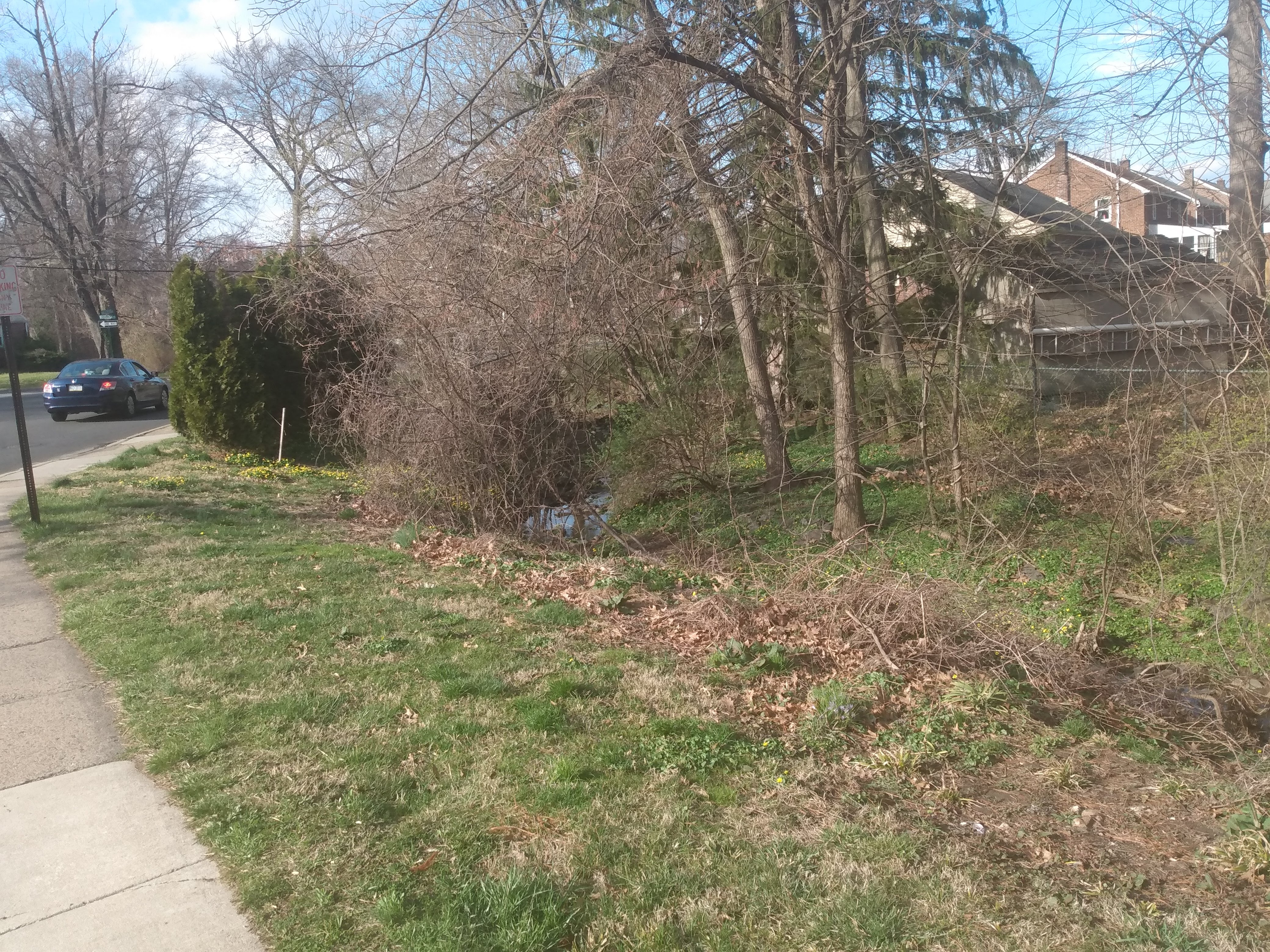
Naylors Run in Haverford Township

Naylors Run is a 4.6-mile-long (7.4 km) tributary of Cobbs Creek in Haverford and Upper Darby Township, Pennsylvania, United States.

== History and geographical features ==
In 1975, a small dam was built near Naylors Run Park to help control flooding.

Naylors Run flows underground in Upper Darby from Sherbrook Boulevard to Walnut Park Drive, where it joins Cobbs Creek. Thousands of feet of Naylors Run were channeled into underground culverts to facilitate commercial and residential development in the filled land above the pipes. Naylors Run joins Cobbs Creek near 63rd st and Cedar Lane.

Naylors Run would normally be an intermittent stream, but it has become a perennially flowing stream because of the treated water discharged from the Havertown PCP Superfund water treatment facility.

== Havertown PCP superfund site pollution ==
The Havertown PCP Superfund site severely polluted Naylors Run. National Wood Preservers (NWP) operated a wood preservation treatment plant at the intersection of Eagle Road and West Hillcrest Avenue in Havertown from 1947 to 1991. During its operations, chemicals used to treat wood and waste products were dumped into a well on the property. These chemicals fed directly into Naylors Run.

In 1962, the Pennsylvania Department of Health discovered pollution leaking into Naylors Run and attributed it to NWP's waste disposal practices after receiving complaints from local residents about an oily substance being discharged from a sewer pipe. Analysis of water samples from Naylors Creek measured pentachlorophenol (PCP) concentrations of 0.5 parts per million (ppm). Concentrations of PCP at 0.2 ppm are lethal to fish. The Environmental Protection Agency (EPA) ranked the Havertown PCP Superfund site the eighth worst cleanup project in the United States.

In 1976, the Environmental Protection Agency (EPA) initiated clean-up action under section 311 of the Clean Water Act. They installed filter fences to remove PCP contaminated oil from the surface water of Naylors Run. They sealed a sanitary sewer pipe and attempted to seal a storm sewer drain but contaminants continued to drain directly into Naylors Run.

From 1981 to 1983, the EPA conducted an investigation to determine the level of contamination of Naylors Run. It was believed that 90% of the PCP released into the stream had been absorbed into the sediment and could potentially act as a secondary source of contamination. At the EPA's recommendation, NWP posted signs along Naylors Run to warn about the health risks.

In 1987, the EPA tested samples from nine locations in Naylors Run and detected contaminants such as arsenic, benzo(a)anthracene, benzo(a)pyrene, dioxins, and PCP.

In 1989, the EPA installed a catch-basin and oil/water separator for the storm drain effluent into Naylors Run. The oil/water separator was removed after installation of recovery wells and a water treatment facility at the main contamination site in 2001.

In 2008, the EPA determined that sediment and surface water in Naylors Run did not contain contaminants from the Havertown PCP Superfund site in excess of EPA risk levels. They did however determine that the stream contained other chemicals in excess of EPA risk levels from sources other than the Superfund site.

Remediation and monitoring efforts are ongoing and the EPA transferred control of the superfund site to the Pennsylvania Department of Environmental Protection in 2013. The site was deemed to be "short-term protective of human health and the environment" in the sixth five-year report conducted by the EPA in 2020.

== See also ==
- List of rivers of Pennsylvania
