= Blue Bell Inn, Philadelphia =

Historic Inn in Darby, Pennsylvania

Blue Bell Inn
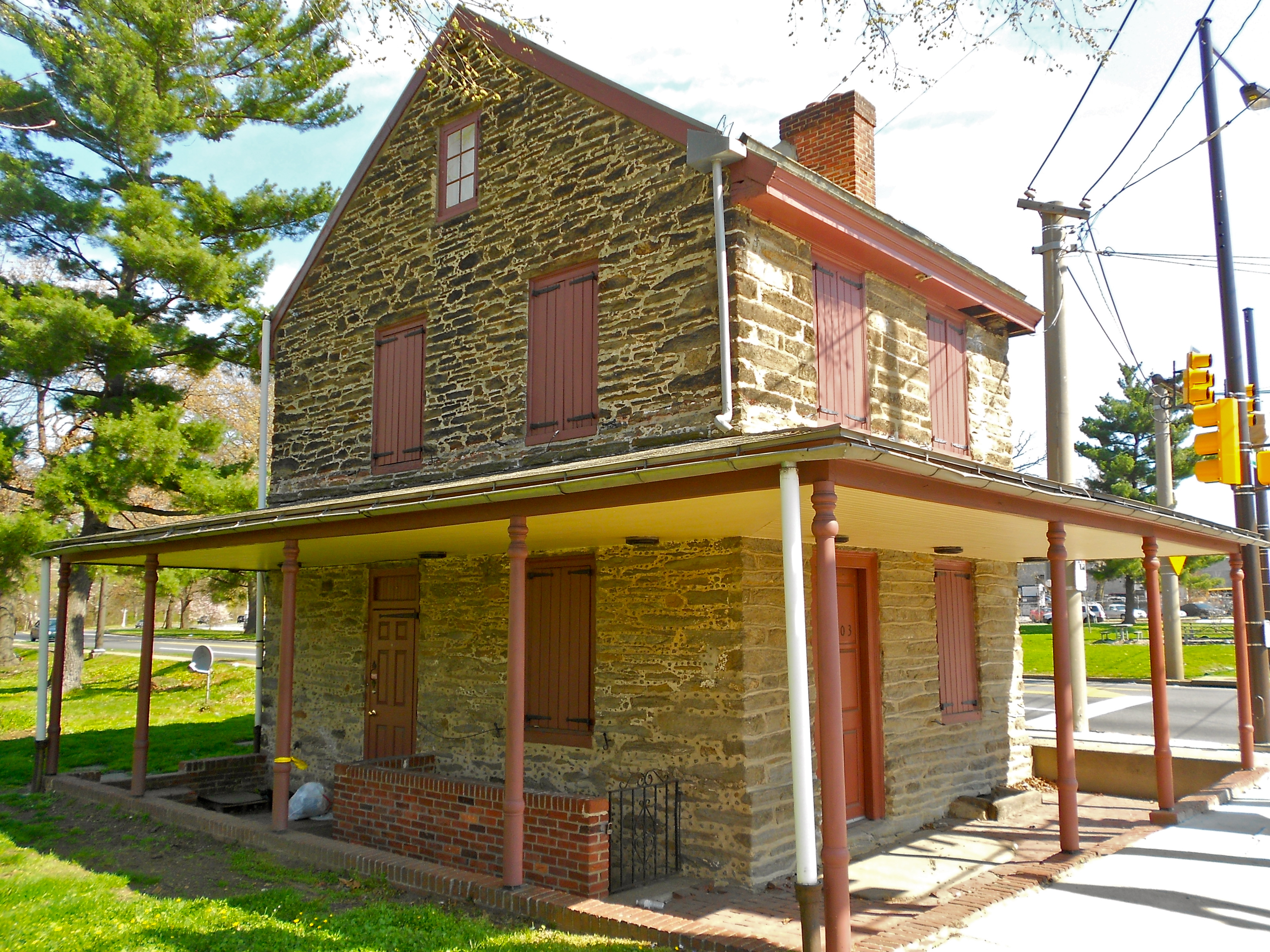
- Alternative names: Blue Bell Tavern

General information
- Location: 7303 Woodland Ave, Philadelphia, Pennsylvania, U.S.
- Coordinates: 39.917242°N 75.246545°W
- Years built: 1766 1801 (addition) 1941 (removal of addition)

Technical details
- Floor count: 3.5

Design and construction
- Architect: Henry Paschall

The Blue Bell Inn (also known as the Blue Bell Tavern) is a historic inn located along the Cobbs Creek between Philadelphia and Darby, Pennsylvania.

== History ==
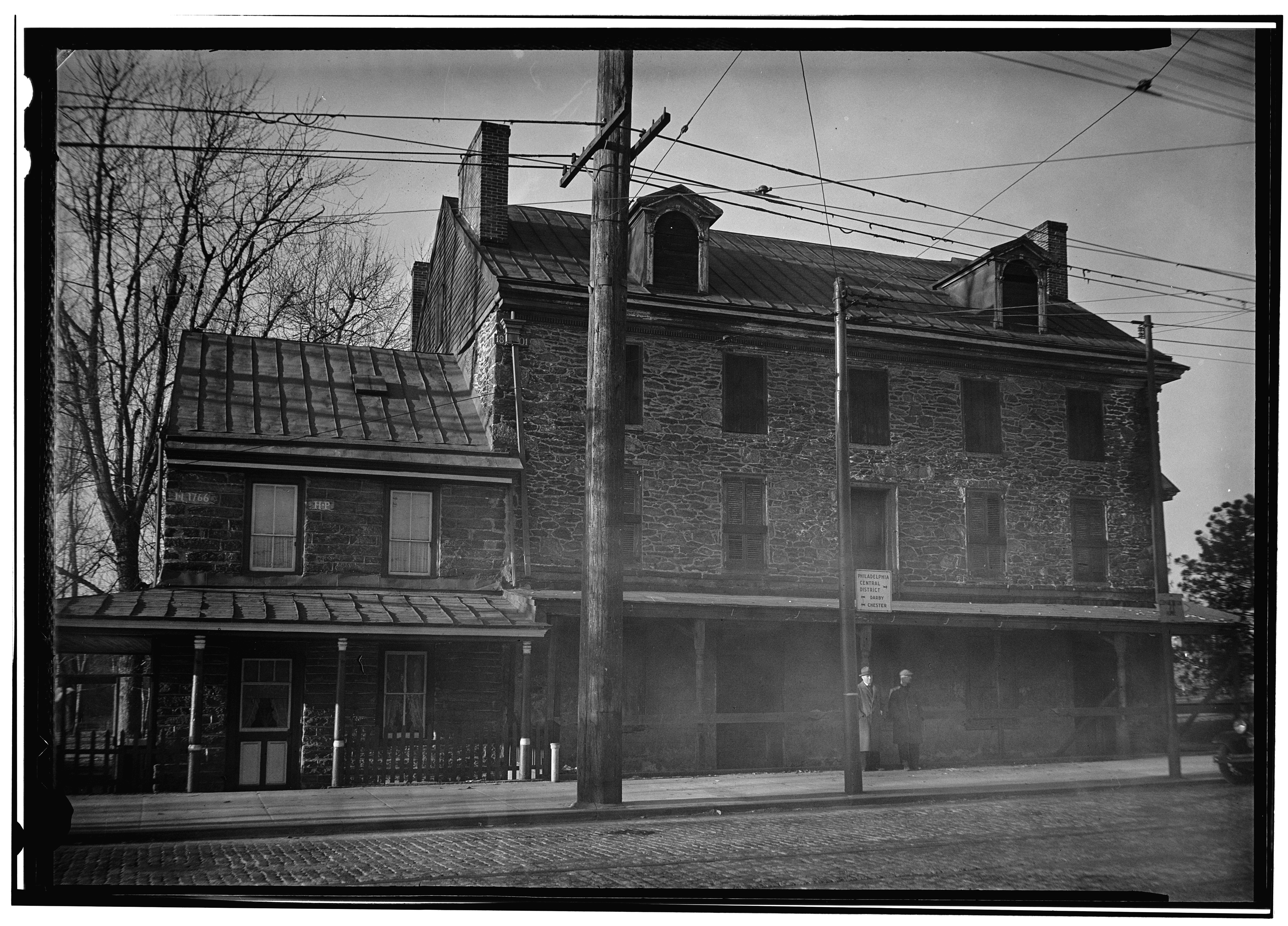
Photograph from 1936 with now-removed addition

The Inn was constructed in 1766 by Henry Paschall along the stagecoach route connecting Philadelphia to the southern American colonies. It was located in front of the Cobbs Creek river, and was on the acreage of the first mill owned by William Wood. It was frequented by both George Washington and his troops during the American Revolution; it was the site of a November 1777 battle sieged by Lord Cornwallis and 2,500 of his soldiers. It was located along the Washington–Rochambeau Revolutionary Route.

In 1801, a three-story addition was added to the building, tripling the size of it. Several fires and floods damaged it enough that it was torn down in 1941. It was owned starting in 1837 by proprietor Charles Lloyd. Much of the surrounding area was cleared out to make way for the Cobbs Creek Parkway. In 1913, it was acquired by the Fairmount Park Commission.

In 1985, the "Friends of the Blue Bell" was formed in the interest of the building's preservation.

In June 2023, a SEPTA trolley crashed into the building, breaking most of its windows, which were subsequently boarded up.
