= Havertown, Pennsylvania =

Unincorporated community in Pennsylvania, US

Havertown
- Unincorporated community
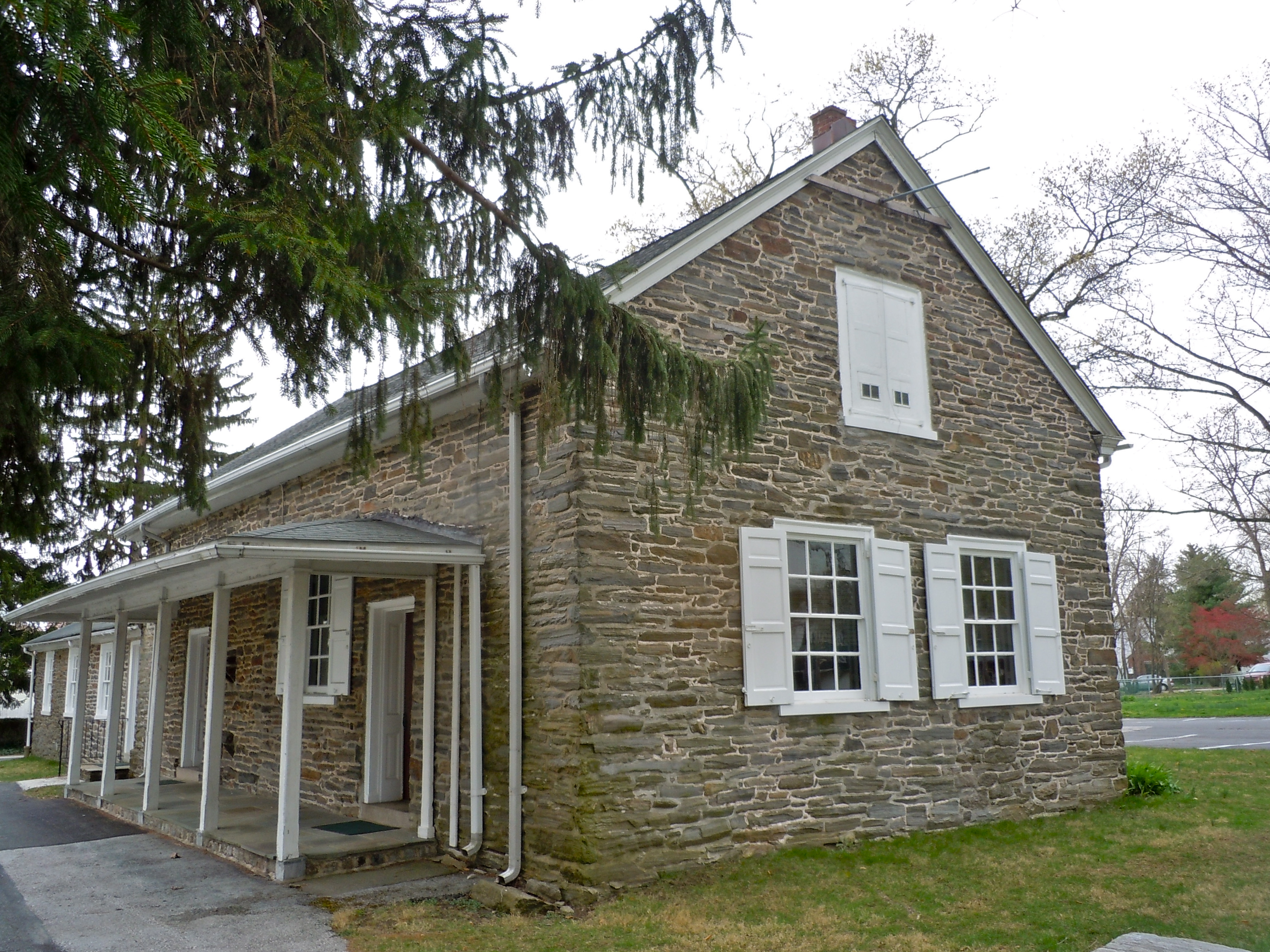
- Old Haverford Friends Meetinghouse

- Location of Havertown in Pennsylvania Havertown (the United States)
- Coordinates: 39°58′51″N 75°18′31″W
- Country: United States
- State: Pennsylvania
- County: Delaware
- Township: Haverford
- Founded: 1681
- Elevation: 276 ft (84 m)
- Time zone: UTC−5 (EST)
  - Summer (DST): UTC−4 (EDT)
- ZIP Code: 19083
- Area codes: 610 and 484

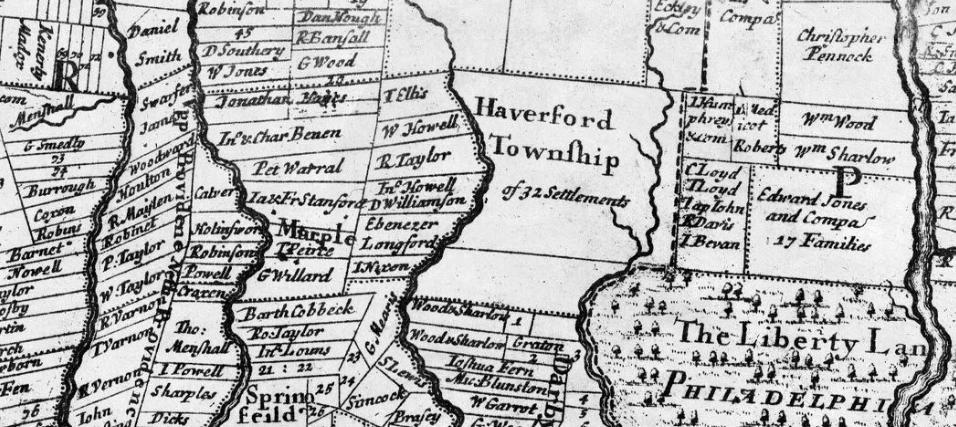
Haverford Township, 1681

Havertown is a residential suburban unincorporated community in Haverford Township, Pennsylvania, United States. It is located approximately 9 miles west of the center of Philadelphia. Havertown's ZIP Code is 19083 and "Havertown" is a postal address. The name "Havertown" was coined by the U.S. Post Office and came into use on January 1, 1946. Before then, each constituent community was known by its local name: Bon Air, Brookline, Penfield, Beechwood, Llanerch, Manoa, Oakmont, Coopertown, and Ardmore. Under William Penn's land divisions these communities were part of the Welsh Tract.

== History ==
Haverford Township was founded by Welsh Quakers in 1681 on land purchased from William Penn. The settlers named their new home after Haverfordwest (Hwlffordd) in Wales. The township is home to many historic sites. The Grange Estate entertained the Revolutionary War figures George Washington and General Lafayette. Nitre Hall, along Karakung (Cobb's) Creek, supplied the United States with over 800,000 pounds of gunpowder during the War of 1812. Leedom Hall was the probable home of William Howell, the founder of Haverford Mills, which date from 1688. Other Havertown sites listed on the National Register of Historic Places include the Federal School and Lawrence Cabin. Coopertown appears as early as 1848 as the first community, and the earliest post office is found at the Spread Eagle Tavern at the junction of the present Eagle and Manoa Roads. The Haverford Township Historical Society maintains a survey of historic resources notable to the township.

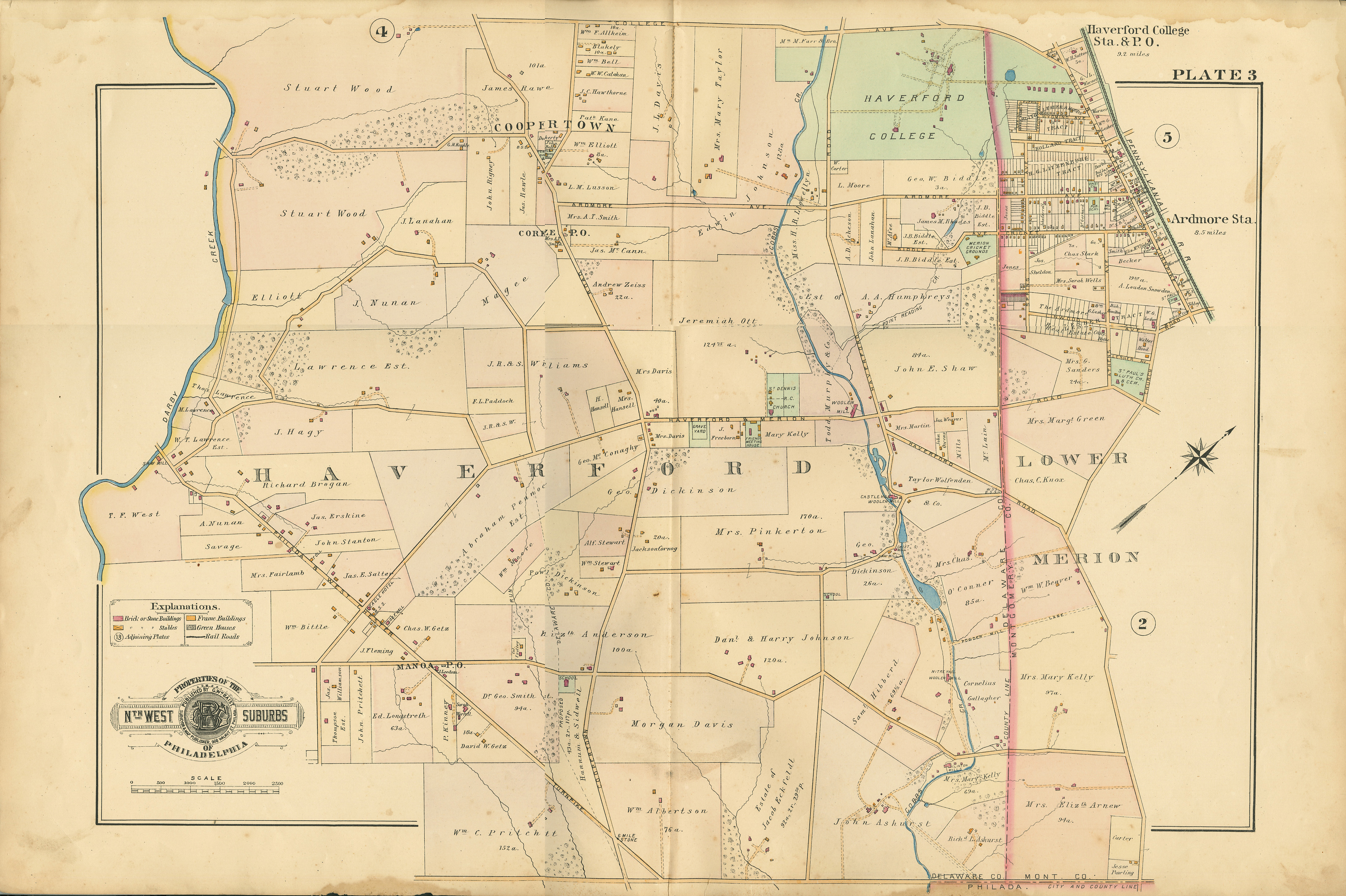
Haverford Township c. 1902

Historic roads

The Haverford Road is one of the earliest roads laid out by civil ordinance. Dates for its layout and completion vary from 1687 to 1703. Darby Road, known earlier as Coopertown Road, dates from 1687. Records show its extension to Radnor, the "principal market for corn," ordered in 1696. Mill Road, at one time called Dickinson Mill Road, may be one of the earliest roads of popular use. Its zig-zag pattern illustrates the indirect path required by horse and cart going up or down hill. Eagle Road, which takes its present name from the Spread Eagle Tavern, c.1814, led Quaker settlers to the Haverford Meeting House.

The railroads and planned communities

Prior to the First World War Haverford was a township of extensive farms. Property maps in 1862 indicate that the landowners were descendants of the same families that arrived with William Penn: among them, the Lawrences, the Ellises, the Humphreys and the Lewises. In 1895 the Philadelphia and West Chester Traction Company began service between 69th Street and West Chester with a major junction at Llanerch. By 1902 the maps indicated a significant change in land ownership. Most of the old family names no longer appeared. In that same year on May 29, the trolley line opened the branch from Llanerch to Ardmore. Llanerch first appeared as a small community with numbered streets. Darby Road was called Coopertown Road. A commercial rail line, now removed, served Boyle Fuel, Lobb Lumber and the Swell Bubble Gum factory up until the 1960s (see map).

=== Llanerch ===
Llanerch, situated at the intersection of West Chester Pike and Darby Road, was the first planned community of Haverford Township. Like many other suburban communities, Llanerch was the child of the railroad companies. The railroad built houses for commuters who bought tickets for the rail lines. As a result of Llanerch's railroad expansions, Haverford Township's population tripled in size, due to increased transportation. In 1897 the community was composed of twelve houses and Saint Andrew's Church. These were all designed by Philadelphia architect Frank Allison Hayes (1866–1930). Llanerch's first school followed in 1905. The present school structure, no longer functioning as a school and converted to an apartment complex, dates from 1913.

=== Brookline ===
Brookline, while not the first planned community, was the most fully executed. The Mueller Atlas of Delaware County, 1909, shows the initial layout for Brookline. At that time Darby Road between Eagle Road and Llanerch was called Haverford Road.

Some construction began around that year, but it was not until after the First World War that the Manor Real Estate Company, a subsidiary of the railroads, set out a plan for a housing development that offered every service, amenity and community need: "Brookline Manor" (see map). As in the 1909 plan, there is an arrangement of regular streets divided by a broad boulevard. The boulevard intersected at a "T" juncture with the major township thoroughfare, Darby Road. The Boulevard would be home to commercial, religious and educational services. At the upper end of the Boulevard, mercantile stores provided shoe makers, tap rooms, florists, bakery, barbers, a five and ten store, the Quaker Store, the A&P grocery store and the Boulevard movie theater. Along the length of the Boulevard the community found their religious houses of worship: the Methodist Church, Saint Faith Episcopal Church, Church of the Annunciation of the Blessed Virgin Mary, and Temple Lutheran. On Earlington Road, to the side of the Boulevard's far end, the Brookline School (1913) met educational needs.

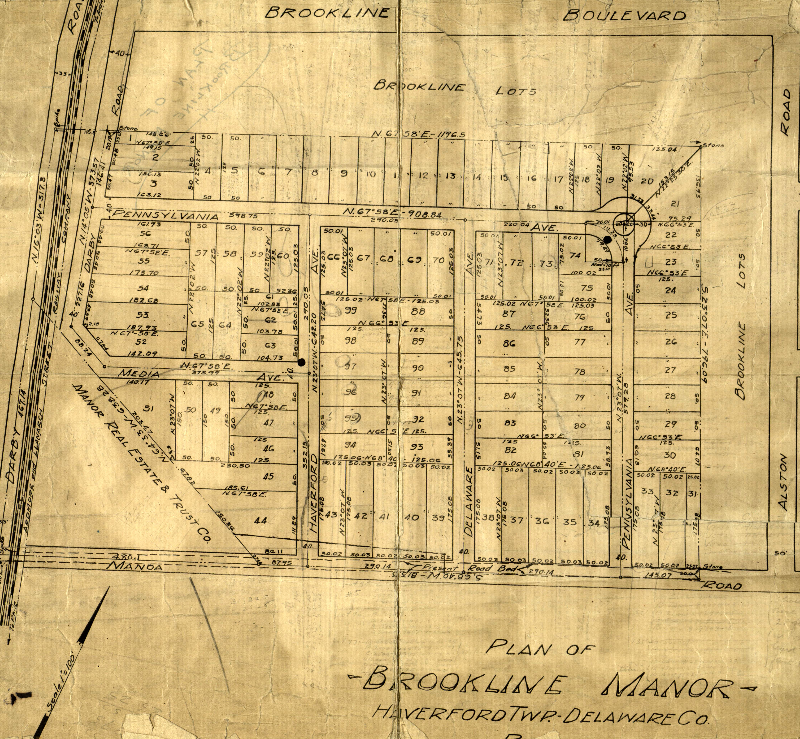
Brookline Manor c. 1925

Just west of the intersection of the Boulevard with Darby Road was the Brookline Fire Company (1916). Just beyond on Darby Road were the Brookline Library (1938) and the Haverford High School (1923). In the early days the Brookline County Club and the Brookline airport were situated just behind Haverford High School. Back at the intersection of Brookline Boulevard and Darby Road, at the corner of Manoa Road were the police station on the west side and Shearer's greenhouse and nursery on the east side.

The railroad company attended to their needs to sell tickets as well as to that of Brookline Manor for transportation. The Red Arrow Trolley line #103 ran from Ardmore down Darby Road, then on to West Chester Pike to 69th and Market Streets, thus offering commuters quick access to the city. The tracks which divided Darby Road were lined with fences of early blooming red roses. A bus line ran from Ardmore to 69th and Market by way of Brookline Boulevard and Earlington Road. The junction of the two lines was at the intersection of Darby Road and Brookline Boulevard. At the far end of Brookline Boulevard commuters found the services of the P&W, The Philadelphia and Western high-speed line, an electric train system that even today is one of the most rapid. With trolley lines at one end, the P&W at the other, and a bus that ran between the two, transportation to Philadelphia could not have been more convenient. The electric trolley lines were dismantled in 1966 in favor of gasoline operated buses.

=== The Irish in Havertown ===
According to the 2000 US Census, Haverford Township ranked in the top 60 of census-recognized municipalities nationwide in percentage of population with Irish ancestry. Havertown and the surrounding Delaware County area have been referred to in local and regional media as the "33rd county of Ireland," a colloquial nickname reflecting the area's historically significant Irish-American population and cultural traditions.

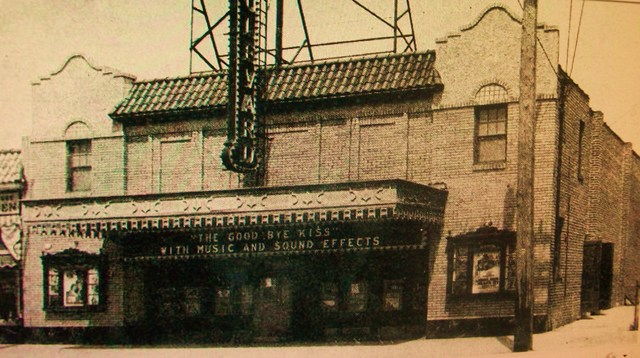
The Boulevard Theater grand opening, 1928

The arrival of the Irish in Haverford Township occurred in three phases: the 19th-century mill era, the early 20th-century railroad communities, and the post-World War II suburban housing tracts.

Born in Ireland in 1779, Dennis Kelly arrived in Philadelphia in 1806. After several years of manual labor he became the prosperous owner of the complex of mills along Karakung Creek. He and his mills attracted the first Irish Catholics to the otherwise Protestant community. 1860 census records attest to the Irish presence and their occupations in the mills. In 1822, mindful of duty to community and faith, Kelly bought and donated land opposite the Friends' Meeting House on the hilltop above the mills for the construction of the first Catholic church.

The second and more significant arrival of the Irish came with the planned community of Brookline, c.1925, and portions of Manoa and Oakmont. In 1927 the Church of the Annunciation and the Church of the Sacred Heart together with their schools assured Catholics seeking life in the suburbs of a religious home.

The third and largest phase of the Irish move came with the large brick house tract developments of Beechwood, Chatham Park and Manoa.

== Arts and culture ==
=== Haverford Music Festival ===
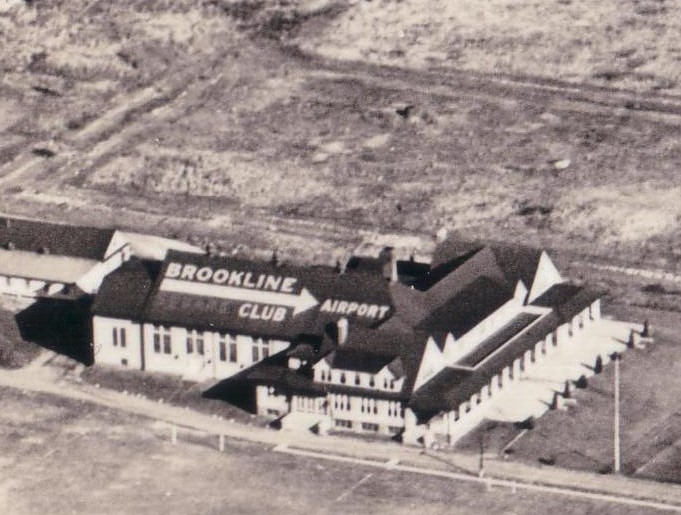
Brookline Country Club and Airport

The concept for the Haverford Music Festival was introduced by the Haverford Township Civic Council (HTCC), a private, non-profit organization that funds historic, environmental, business, and community initiatives in Haverford Township. Inspired by the Philadelphia Folk Festival, Bethlehem Musikfest and other music festivals in the area, the all-day, family-oriented Haverford Music Festival has taken place annually in the Oakmont Business District of Havertown since 2011. In 2012, the festival attracted more than 15,000 people, who enjoyed over 30 bands on three stages. HTCC benefits from festival proceeds and uses to fund community-based programs within Haverford Township. Proceeds from the 2011 Music Festival were given to the Haverford Partnership for Economic Development for Oakmont Business District Beautification.

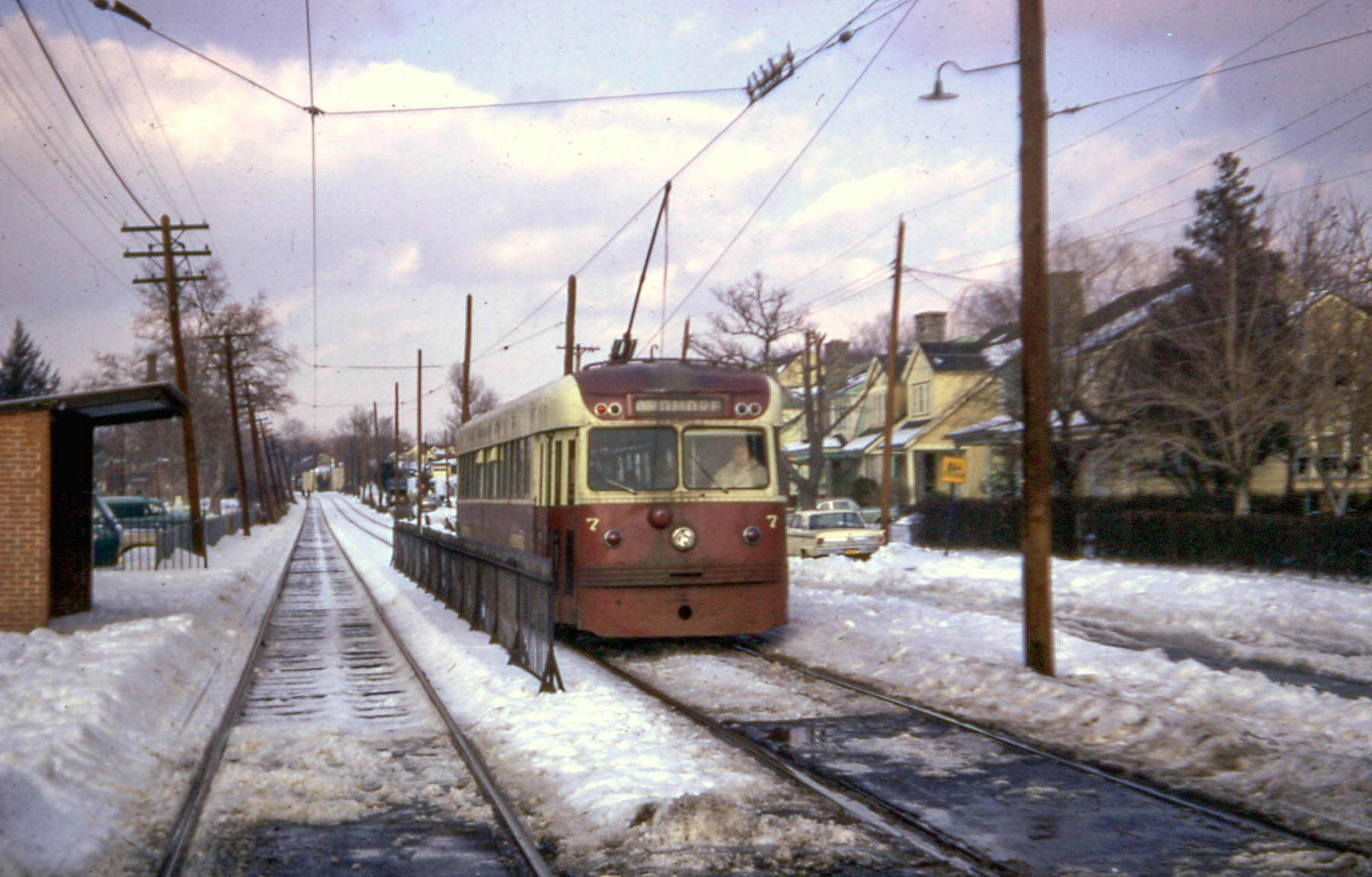
Ardmore Trolley Line, 1966

== Parks and recreation ==
Havertown is home to over 30 outdoor parks and playing fields. The town also provides other recreation facilities, including the Haverford Township Free Library, and the Haverford Township Skatium, a multi-use ice rink for Havertown residents.

Parks in Havertown include Llanerch Park, Veterans Park, Karakung Field/Drive, Chatham Glen, the Grange Field, and Haverford Reserve/Freedom Playground.

== Education ==
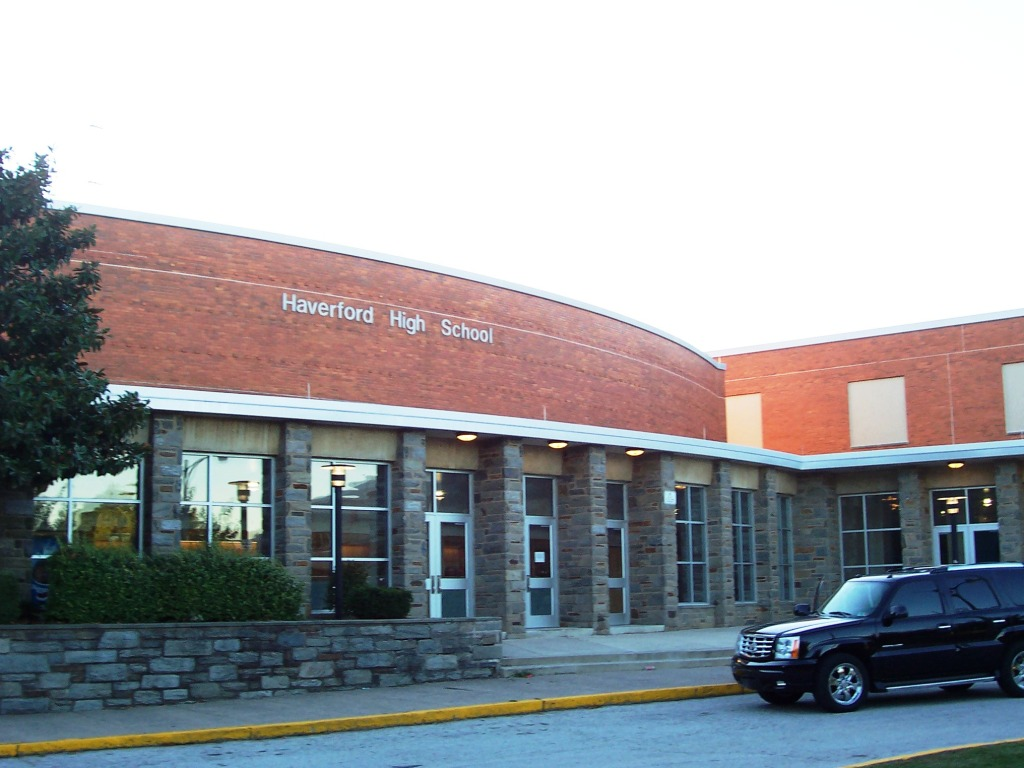
Haverford High School

Havertown is served by the School District of Haverford Township, which has one high school, one middle school, and five elementary schools. Prior to 1923, Oakmont Elementary served as both the townships junior and senior high school. Towards the downturn of World War I, need for more schooling facilities became apparent after an influx in the townships population. This prompted the construction of Haverford Middle School which eventually finished in 1923, then serving as a combined junior and senior school. Eventually, the later construction of Haverford High School in 1956 prompted for the old combination high school to become the middle school, and for the newly built location to become the high school. A newly refurbished elementary school, Chestnutwold Elementary, re-opened its doors in early September 2006. It replaced Oakmont Elementary, which became home to the district offices. In 2009, Manoa Elementary School moved from Manoa Road to the intersection of Manoa and Eagle Roads, taking part of the field that had been there for many years. In 2021, Lynnewood Elementary opened its doors to the newly refurbished school. The Haverford High School sports teams are called the "Fords," and they have a Model T Ford as mascot.

Cardinal John Foley Regional School is the area's Catholic school. It formed in 2012 from a merger of Annunciation B.V.M. and St. Denis Catholic schools.

== Infrastructure ==
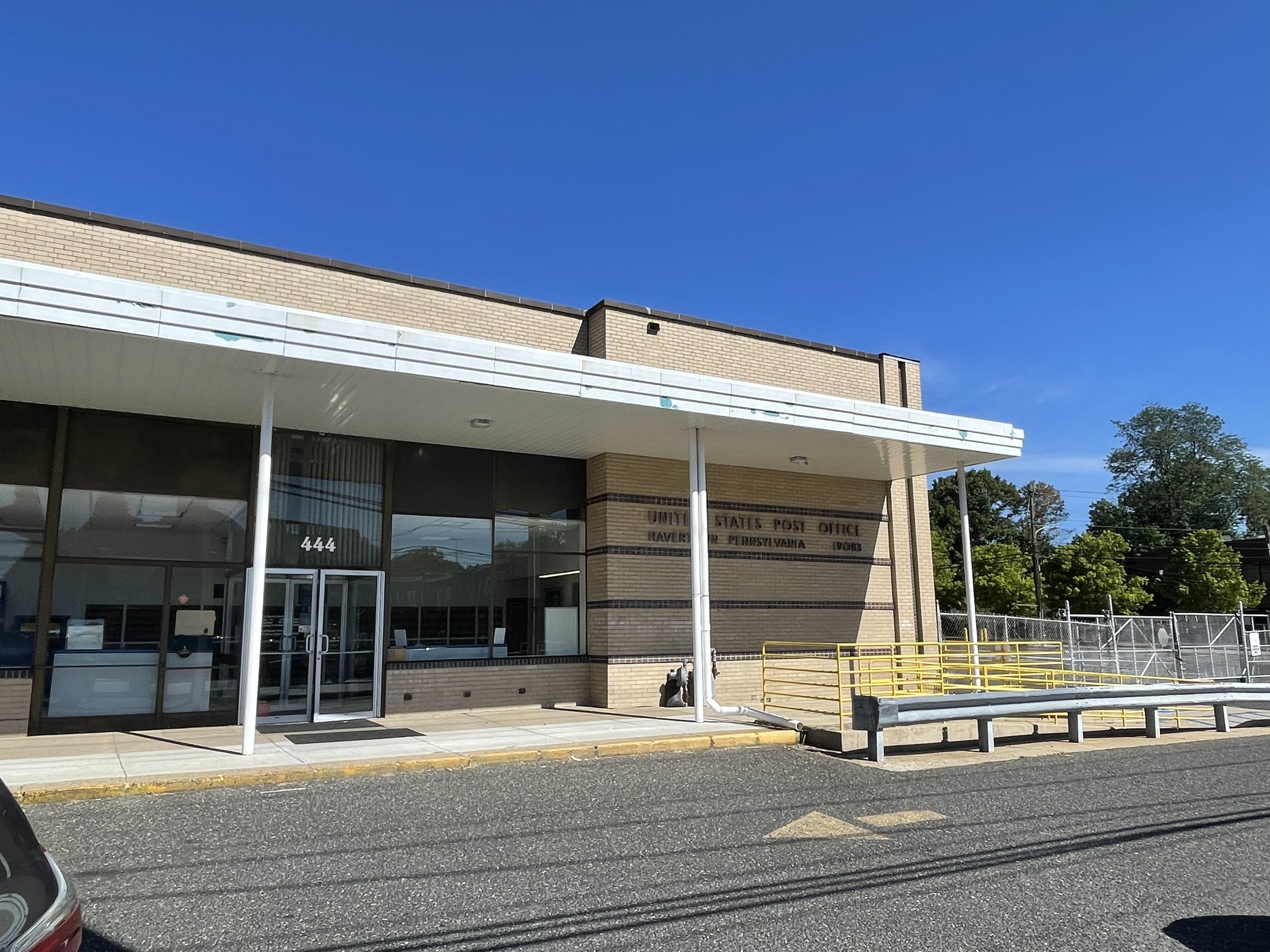
Havertown post office

=== Police and fire ===
The town is protected by the Haverford Township Police Department and five volunteer fire companies that make up the Haverford Township Bureau of Fire.

== Environmental remediation ==
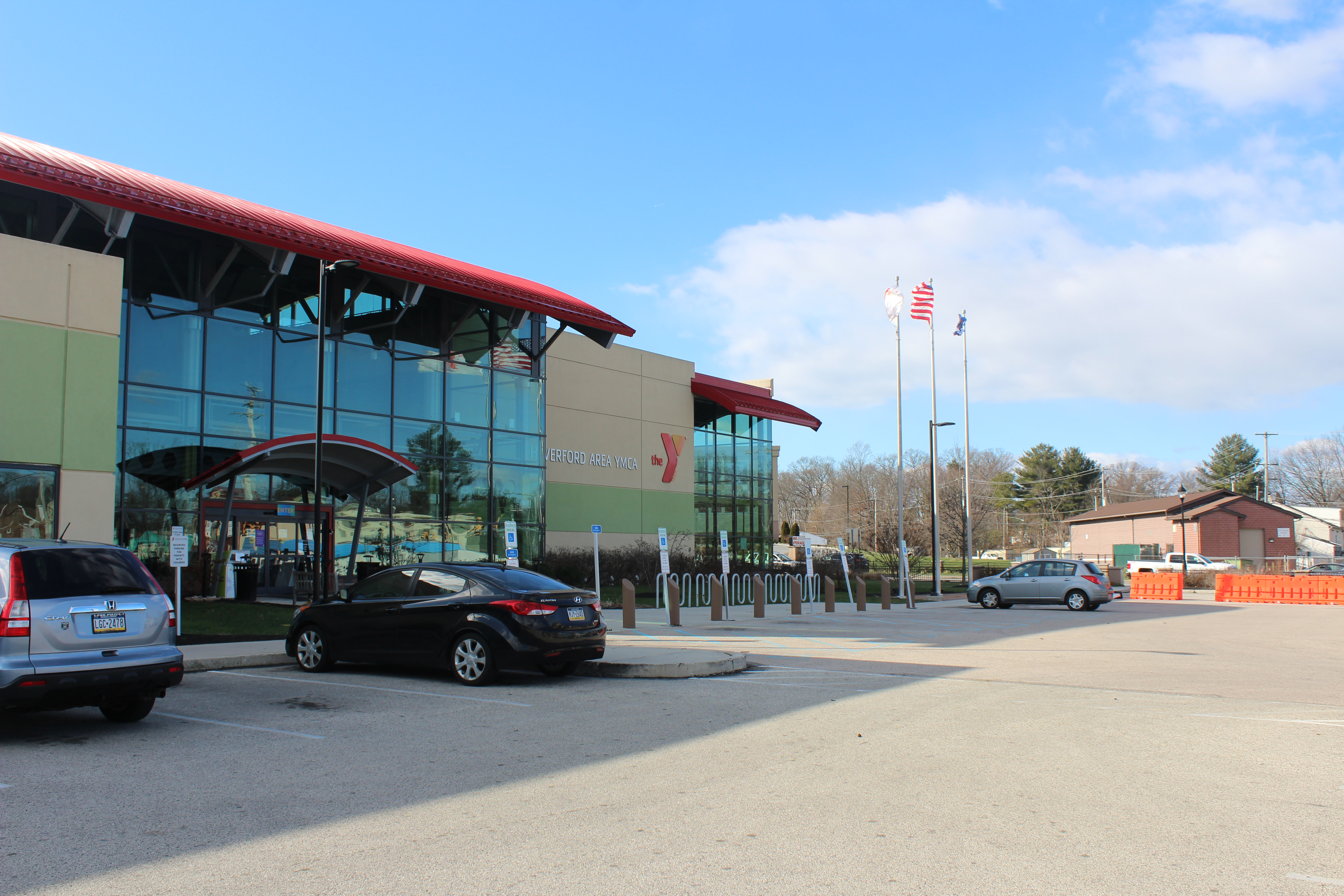
Haverford Area YMCA, built on the remediated Havertown PCP Superfund site

The Havertown Superfund site was caused by the National Wood Preservers wood treatment facility, which was in operation from 1947 to 1991. Chemicals used to treat wood and waste products were dumped into a well on the property. These chemicals fed directly into Naylor's Run Creek and eventually into the Delaware River, for which the creek is a tributary. The Environmental Protection Agency (EPA) ranked the site the eighth worst cleanup project in the United States and initiated remediation efforts in 1976. The site was added to the National Priorities List in 1983 and designated as a Superfund cleanup site in early 1990s. The EPA transferred control of the site to the Pennsylvania Department of Environmental Protection in 2013. Although approximately 26,000 people live within a mile of the site, there are no known users of the groundwater within a one-mile radius of the site. The nearby population is on the public water supply.

The site was deemed to be "short-term protective of human health and the environment" in the sixth five-year report conducted by the EPA in 2020. A self storage facility and a YMCA facility were built over parts of the remediated site. Treatment of contaminated groundwater and monitoring of the site are ongoing.

== See also ==
- Welsh Tract
