= Nitre Hall =

Historic house in Pennsylvania, United States

- U.S. National Register of Historic Places
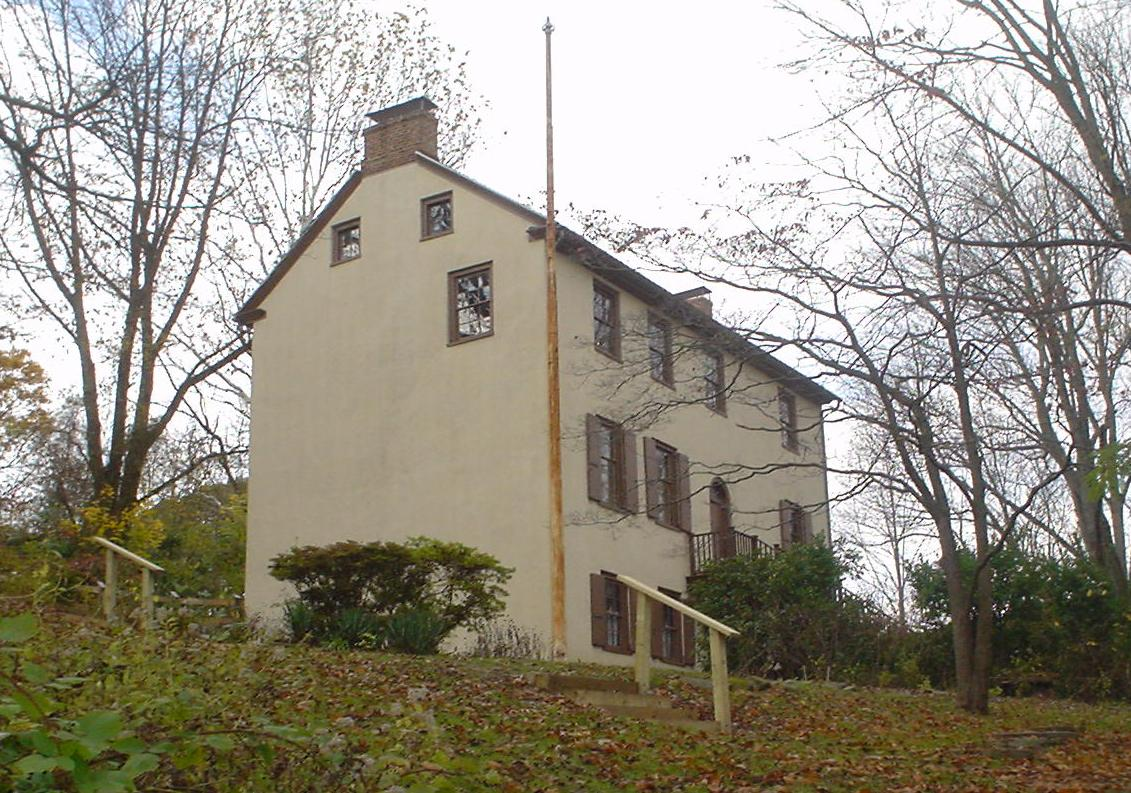
- Nitre Hall, November 2009

- Location within Pennsylvania Location within the United States
- Location: Karakung Dr., Haverford, Pennsylvania
- Coordinates: 39°59′1″N 75°17′9″W
- Area: 9 acres (3.6 ha)
- Built: 1805
- Architectural style: Federal, I house
- NRHP reference No.: 70000545
- Added to NRHP: December 18, 1970

Nitre Hall is a nineteenth-century, American building that is located in Haverford Township, Delaware County, Pennsylvania.

It was listed on the National Register of Historic Places in 1970.

== History and architectural features ==
Built shortly after 1800 on the banks of Cobbs Creek, by Israel Whelen, Jr., the hall was the residence of the master of the Nitre Hall Powder Mills, which has long since been torn down. With the ground floor reserved for custodians, the upper two floors are decorated in Empire and Victorian style. The top floor contains various temporary exhibits and the educational Colonial Living Experience. It is situated near Lawrence Cabin, another historic building.

Nitre Hall is open to the public May through October, in December for special events, and by appointment for a nominal admission charge, according to the Haverford Township Historical Society.

The building's main use is for school and group field trips. The historical society puts on a "day in the life" show for the township's fifth graders.
