= Dorney Road Landfill =

Superfund site in Pennsylvania

Coordinates: 40.5247°N 75.6538°W

- Superfund site
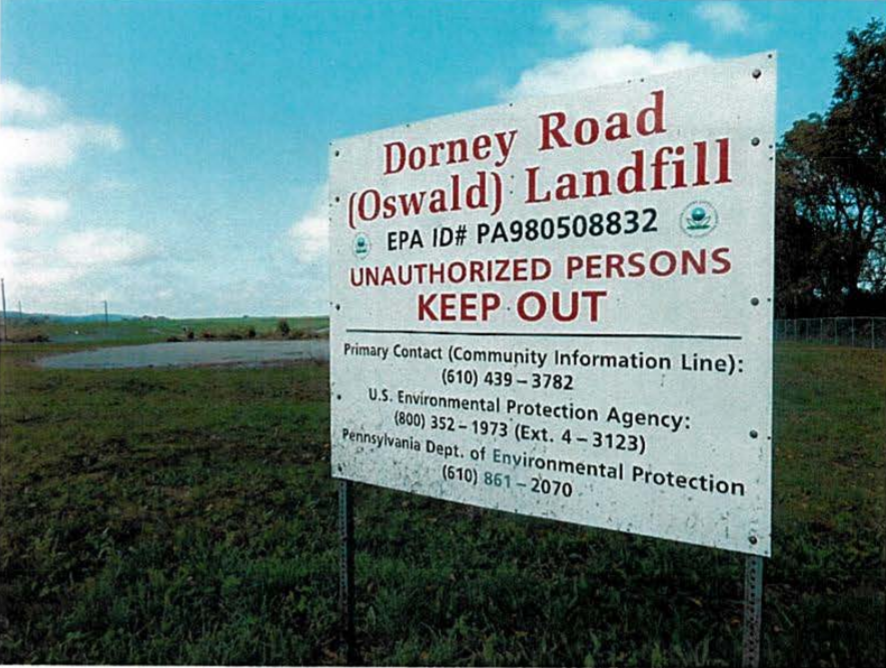
- A Dorney Road Landfill sign in May 2018
- Location: Longswamp Township, Upper Macungie Township, Berks and Lehigh counties, Pennsylvania

Information
- Contaminants: polcyclic aromatic hydrocarbons, lead, chromium, trichloroethylene, tetrachloroethylene, vinyl chloride, benzene, arsenic
- Responsible parties: R. Emory Mabry, Harold Oswald

Progress
- Proposed: September 1, 1983
- Listed: September 1, 1984
- Deleted: September 24, 2018

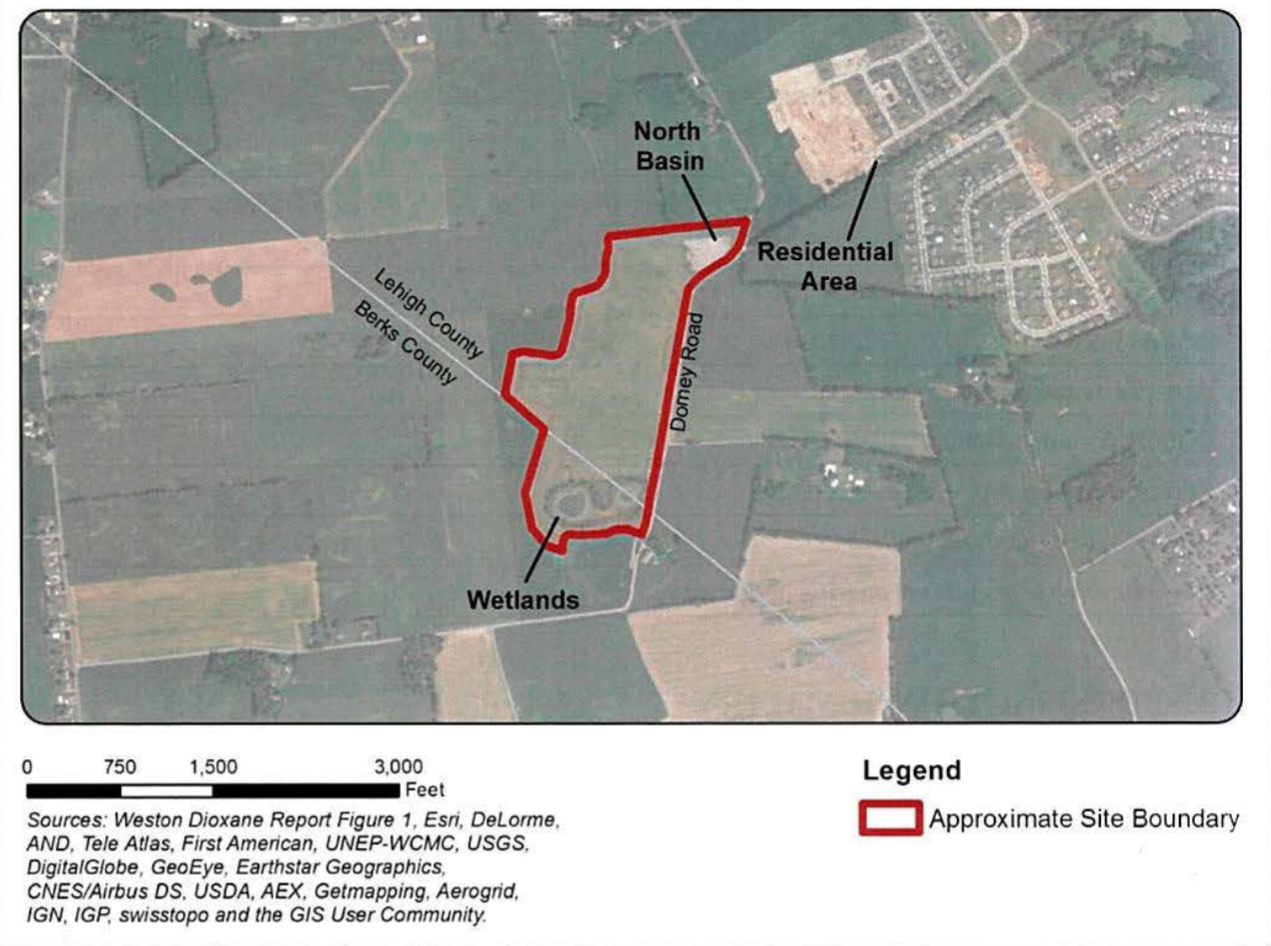
Aerial view of Dorney Road landfill in May 2018

Dorney Road Landfill is a 27-acre (11 ha) municipal and industrial landfill in Upper Macungie Township and Longswamp Township, Pennsylvania that was polluted with toxic waste from 1952 to 1978. The site is surrounded by rural residences and farmland. The U.S. Environmental Protection Agency (EPA) added the site to the Superfund National Priorities List in 1984. The site was remediated and removed from the National Priorities List in 2018.

== History ==
The landfill began in 1952 in an old iron-ore pit by R. Emory Mabry. It was expanded to 27 acres (11 ha) by Harold Oswald who operated the landfill from 1966 to 1979. The state inspected the landfill in 1972 and found that industrial sludge, batteries, and barrels of petroleum product had been dumped on site. Contamination was detected in nearby water wells in 1982 and the landfill was the immediate suspect.

Groundwater and soil analyses showed the presence of carcinogenic and other contaminants such as polcyclic aromatic hydrocarbons, lead, chromium, trichloroethylene, tetrachloroethylene, vinyl chloride, benzene, and arsenic above the EPA's acceptable regulatory levels. The site was added to the National Priorities List in 1984.

=== Clean-up ===
In 1986, the U.S. Environmental Protection Agency (EPA) conducted a removal action that included regrading the landfill to prevent runoff and erosion of landfill material.

In 1988, the EPA selected a remediation plan for the site which included off-site disposal of 700,000 US gallons (2,600,000 L; 580,000 imp gal) of on-site pond water, construction of a dike and diversion ditch system, installation of a multi-layer cap and gas collection system, groundwater monitoring, and restrictions on access to the site and construction near the site.

In 1991, the EPA issued a second remediation plan which included the continuation of groundwater monitoring and installation of wellhead treatment units in nearby residences.

In 2007, the EPA issued a revision to their original Record of Decision which deemed that controls be put in place to protect the cap over the landfill and that no groundwater wells be installed on the site.

Groundwater testing from 2013 to 2017 showed that the metals manganese, mercury, and thallium were all present in excess of the federal maximum contaminant levels.

In 2018, the EPA removed the site from the National Priorities List and determined that all performance standards had been achieved and that no additional Superfund response actions, other than operation and maintenance and Five-Year Reviews, were necessary to protect human health and the environment.

== Current status ==
The EPA continues to monitor groundwater and physically inspect the landfill cap on a quarterly basis. A five-year review report conducted in 2018 determined that the remedies in place are protective of human health and the environment. The next five-year review is scheduled to be released in 2023.
