= Cobbs Creek =

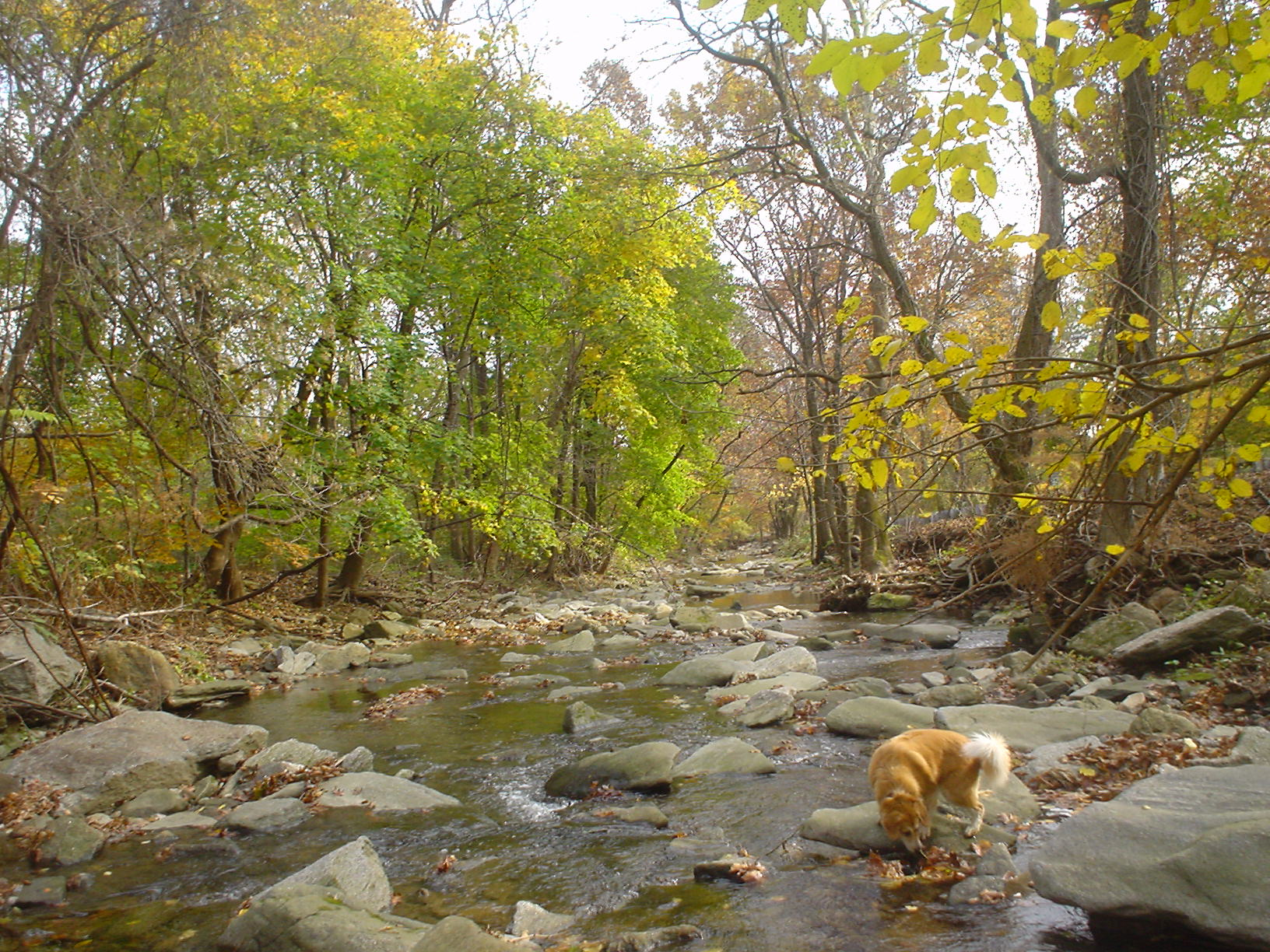
- Cobbs Creek near Nitre Hall

- Location of the mouth of Cobbs Creek in Pennsylvania

Location
- Country: United States
- State: Pennsylvania
- Counties: Philadelphia, Montgomery, Delaware
- Cities: Philadelphia, Upper Darby, Darby, Millbourne

Physical characteristics
- Source: Cobbs Creek
  - location: Montgomery County, Pennsylvania, Montgomery County, Pennsylvania, United States
  - coordinates: 40°00′54″N 75°19′32″W
  - elevation: 377 ft (115 m)
- Mouth: Darby Creek
  - location: Darby, Pennsylvania, United States
  - coordinates: 39°54′23″N 75°15′11″W
  - elevation: 0 ft (0 m)
- Length: 11.8 mi (19.0 km)
- Basin size: 100 sq mi (260 km^{2})
- Discharge
  - location: Darby
  - minimum: 195 cu ft/s (5.5 m^{3}/s)
  - maximum: 50,200 cu ft/s (1,420 m^{3}/s)
- Discharge
  - location: Darby

Basin features
- Tributaries
  - left: Naylors Run, Indian Creek, Mingo Creek
  - right: Thomas Run Creek, Paschall Creek

Cobbs Creek is an 11.8-mile-long (19.0 km) tributary of Darby Creek in Delaware County, Pennsylvania, in the United States. It forms an approximate border between Montgomery County and Delaware County. After Cobbs Creek passes underneath Township Line Road (U.S. Route 1), it forms the border between Philadelphia County and Delaware County. It runs directly through the two sides of Mount Moriah Cemetery which spans the border of Southwest Philadelphia and Yeadon, Pennsylvania. It later joins Darby Creek before flowing into the Delaware River.

== History ==
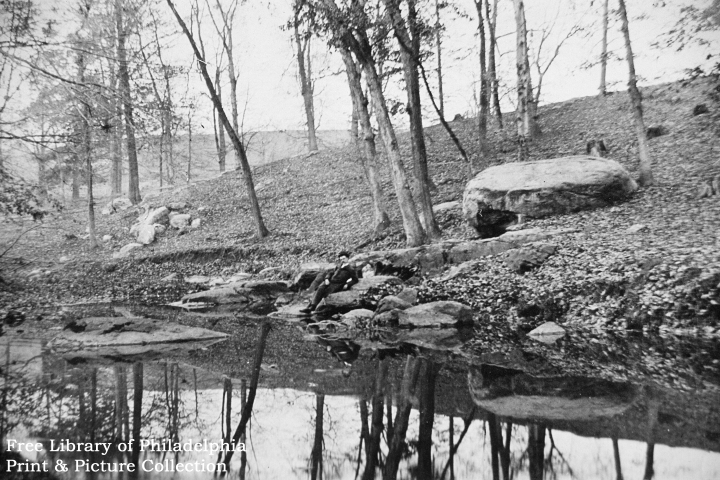
Cobbs Creek in 1880

Prior to European colonization, Cobbs Creek was inhabited by the Lenape Native American tribe, who called the creek "Karakung," believed to mean "the place of the wild geese." It was used primarily for hunting, fishing, transportation, and agriculture. Additionally, at the mouth of Mill Creek, a neighboring water source, there existed village named "Arronemink," meaning "where the fish cease." During the mid-1600s, Dutch and Swedish settlers arrived, draining the marshes surrounding the creek to make space for pastures, and leading to the displacement and forced migration of the Lenape away from the Cobbs and surrounding areas.

This was the site of the historic Old Swede's Mill on the Karakong Kill which Governor Johan Printz, governor of New Sweden had built during 1645. It was the first water mill built within the limits of Pennsylvania. Its site may still be seen at the rocks on the east bank of the stream near the Blue Bell Inn on the road from Philadelphia to Darby. There were a few mills established around the portion of the river located along Karakung Drive in Haverford Township, Pennsylvania. Nitre Hall Powder Mills were built in the early 19th century along Cobb's Creek on Karakung Drive. It was a center for manufacture for almost 200 years.

== Recreation ==
Where Cobbs Creek borders Philadelphia, it is surrounded by Cobbs Creek Park which contains 851 acres (1.330 sq mi) managed by the Philadelphia Parks & Recreation department since a merger of the Fairmount Park Commission and the Department of Recreation in 2010. Cobbs Creek Park contains three playgrounds: Cobbs Creek Recreation Center at Cobbs Creek Parkway and Spruce Street, Granahan playground at 65th and Callowhill streets, and Charles Papa Playground, a part of Morris Park in Overbrook, just north of Cobbs Creek Golf Course. For many in West Philadelphia, Cobbs Creek is the primary hiking and recreation attraction, offering swimming, golf, ball fields, tracks, tennis and basketball courts, ice and roller hockey rinks, and campgrounds. The park and its numerous picnic spaces are popular with families during summer weekends and holidays for picnics, barbecues, reunions and parties.

== Community impact ==
The area covered by the Cobbs was part of a larger bioregion occupied by the Lenape tribe. Referred to as a "favorite place for Indians" by settlers, the surrounding regions were also home to Lenape Native Peoples. This included the area in between the Schuylkill and the Cobbs, now known as Kingsessing. Nomenclature such as that of Kingsessing (derived from the Lenape term "Chingsessing," meaning "where there is meadow") demonstrate the indigenous legacy still prevalent in the area. There remains a significant local Lenape community presence, with groups such as the Lenape Nation of Pennsylvania, which hosted a 2018 river journey, creating a pledge with the surrounding community to support the Lenape peoples.

Additionally, a more general history of the Lenape in the Philadelphia area reads as such: “The story of the Indigenous peoples of Philadelphia begins in the long-ago time with the emergence of Turtle and the earth that formed on its back. From this first earth, the first tree grew and so too did the first sprouts. These sprouts grew and grew and became First Man and First Woman and so the People first came to be. (Adapted from the first written emergence story of the Lenape 1679, as told by Lenape elder Tantaque, courtesy of Curtis Zunigha).”

For many West Philadelphia and Upper Darby children, Cobbs Creek is their first introduction to wooded greenspaces and freshwater ecosystems. Local schools run service learning activities to support conservation in the creek and surrounding parks; e.g., conducting water-quality studies to track pollution. The wildlife includes regional birds, raccoons, opossums, spotted deer, wild turkey, rabbits, and in recent history, even a mountain lion.

Plans for an expressway up the Cobbs Creek valley began as early as 1930. Anticipated as part of a five-mile parkway system around Philadelphia, Cobbs Creek Expressway, designated I-695, would have begun at I-95 near Essington and connected with another expressway at Whitby Avenue in Southwest Philadelphia. The proposals were abandoned in the mid-1970s after community objections.

The Frankford Creek has a similar impact for Cheltenham Township and North Philadelphia children.

The Cobbs Creek Trail is part of the East Coast Greenway, a 3,000-mile long trail system connecting Maine to Florida.

== Tributaries ==
- Naylors Run, runs underground in Upper Darby from Sherbrook Blvd. to Walnut Park Drive, where it drains into Cobbs Creek. Thousands of feet of Naylors Run were channeled into underground culverts to facilitate commercial and residential development in the filled land above the pipes.
- Indian Creek, originating near Montgomery County at Rt.1 running to the Haddington neighborhood of Philadelphia, the east and west branches of Indian Creek joined in what is now Morris Park, at the intersection of 69th Street and Haverford and Lansdowne Avenues. The most notable feature here being the Cobbs Creek Golf Course and Karakung Golf Course.
- Thomas Run Creek, obliterated and converted into a sewer, the largest tributary of Cobbs Creek once ran from about 53rd and Walnut streets, meeting Cobbs Creek around 60th Street.
- Paschall Creek
- Mingo Creek

== See also ==
- List of parks in Philadelphia
- List of rivers of Pennsylvania
- Frankford Creek
- Cobbs Creek Resources
