= Delco Hi-Q =

American academic quiz competition

- Formerly: Scott's Hi-Q
- Genre: Academic Quiz Competition
- Headquarters: Delaware County, Pennsylvania, United States
- Key people: Robert O. Johnson (First Quizmaster)

Delco Hi-Q, formerly Scott's Hi-Q, or just Hi-Q is an academic quiz competition. It was founded in 1948 (78 years ago), and is now an intracounty competition of high school students in six different states: Pennsylvania (Delco Hi-Q); and in Wisconsin, Michigan, Washington, and Alabama as Hi-Q.

== History ==
Delco Hi-Q is the oldest continuous academic quiz competition in the United States. It was started as radio quiz program for high school students in Delaware County, Pennsylvania by the Scott Paper Company, which ran it as a community relations program. "Hi" represented "High School" and "Q" represented "I.Q." The first prize in 1948 was a $1,000 "auditorium style" television set. Robert O. Johnson served as the first Quizmaster. During the early years of Hi-Q, contests were broadcast on radio station WPWA 1590.

Questions were designed to test the general knowledge that students received in the classroom. Over the years, new reference materials were added and students began to answer questions based on specific categories and reference works.

Teams were initially composed of four students for each school; teams were subsequently expanded to six students and then to the current eight-member team. Drawn from three elements, SCOTT, High School, and I.Q., the program was known from the beginning as Scott's Hi-Q. The success of Scott's Hi-Q in Delaware County led Scott Paper to introduce the program across the country. Hi-Q National Director, Donna Zerby, helped the competition expand in 1976 to Washington State, in 1977 to Wisconsin/Michigan, in 1982 to Maine, in 1984 to Arkansas, and in 1987 to Alabama.

After the merger of Scott Paper with Kimberly-Clark in 1997, the program was turned over to longtime director, Donna Zerby. She partnered with the Delaware County Chamber of Commerce to provide stable funding for the program. Kimberly-Clark Corporation-Chester Operations became the primary corporate sponsor and the twenty-one area high schools began financially contributing to the program. Other sponsors and supporters began contributing. Donna Zerby also continued her involvement with Hi-Q on a national level, serving as an independent consultant to those locations. The Delaware County program dropped the Scott Paper name and renamed the program Delco Hi-Q.

Delaware County Intermediate Unit (DCIU) and The Foundation of the Delaware County Chamber entered into a joint sponsorship agreement in 2004 to co-sponsor Delco Hi-Q. DCIU is responsible for providing a Quizmaster, Program Director, as well as the technical services needed to run and manage the program. The Foundation is responsible for soliciting contributions for the program, collecting entrance fees, administering funds, supplies, and conducts the annual awards ceremony. Franklin Mint Federal Credit Union joined Kimberly-Clark as a primary corporate sponsor in 2004 with an initial five year, $75,000 commitment.

Franklin Mint Federal Credit Union joined Delco Hi-Q as a primary corporate sponsor in 2004 and made a long-term commitment to strengthen and sponsor the program and the Partners in Education Celebration. DCIU and Franklin Mint Federal Credit Union started the Delco Hall of Honor in the same year. Its purpose is to honor past participants and supporters and to provide role models for current Hi-Q participants Another new tradition began in 2005, DCIU and FMFCU partnered with the Delaware County Daily Times to start the tradition of the All Delco Hi-Q Team. Donna Zerby was the first inductee into the Hall of Honor and considered it the greatest honor of her career.

The Partners in Education Celebration was started in 2005. What was once a luncheon honoring the three top teams, became a 600-person banquet honoring all of the Delco Hi-Q participants. The dinner is held annually and is presented by the Foundation and DCIU. Alex Trebek served as the guest speaker and 6ABC's Action News anchor Rick Williams was master of ceremonies for the first celebration.

After the passing of Donna in 2005, Ginger Beaumont agreed to serve as director for the 2005/06 season. Ginger had previously spent six years coordinating the Delaware County program under the direction of Mrs. Zerby. The 2005/06 season was dedicated in memory of Donna and her 42-year association with Hi-Q.

In 2006, Franklin Mint Federal Credit Union signed an agreement with DCIU to provide question resources and Program Directors to Delco Hi-Q. Ginger Beaumont remained with Hi-Q and serves as Co-Director with Rick Durante of FMFCU.FMFCU Foundation provides question resources to all locations.

In 2008, Delaware County Intermediate Unit and Franklin Mint Federal Credit Union became co-sponsors of the program. Franklin Mint Federal Credit Union Foundation manages the program.

Hi-Q competitions still take place in Washington, Wisconsin, Alabama, and Pennsylvania, each with different sponsoring organizations. In 1979, Tom McCarthy began his 39-season run as Quizmaster. Rick Durante, Executive Director Franklin Mint Federal Credit Union Foundation, now serves as Quizmaster and Director of the competition.

== Contest Information ==
Twenty-one Delaware County high schools participate in Delco Hi-Q.

Each school team is composed of up to ten students. Each school hosts one contest during the standard season.

Questions are prepared from 14 subjects, including: Art History, Biology, Chemistry, Current Events, Geography, Literature, Mathematics, Physics, Shakespeare, Sports, U.S. Government, U.S. History, and World History. Questions are selected from standard high school scholastic curricula, general scholastic knowledge, or from reference materials provided.

Each high school team competes in three matches each season, excluding possible semi-final and championship appearances. Each match consists of three competing teams. Each match is hosted by one of the participating teams competing in that match. Matches are typically held in the high school auditorium on stage, before an audience of students, teachers, faculty, and community members. Questions are read aloud by the Quizmaster, and at times team members use buzzers to answer questions. Points awarded throughout the season accumulate and determine semi-final and championship entry eligibility.

The highest-scoring team at the end of the regular season automatically becomes a participant in the Championship Match and does not compete in the Semifinals, hosting the championship. The following eight scoring teams compete in playoffs for a spot in the championship. The seventh, eighth, and ninth highest-scoring teams compete in a wildcard match for a spot in the semifinal against the second and sixth seeds, and the third, fourth, and fifth seeds compete in their own semifinal. In the single-contest Championship Match, the two semifinal winners compete against the highest-scoring team from the standard season. All teams start at zero in the semifinal and the championship match.

Delco Hi-Q participants are honored at the annual "Partners in Education" dinner in May. Guest speakers have included celebrities such as Alex Trebek, Ken Jennings, and John Allen Paulos.

== Awards ==
In the Delco Hi-Q Championship Match, first, second and third place teams win cash awards for their schools of $3,000, $2,500 and $2,000 respectively.

A revolving trophy is presented annually to the Champion for display by that school throughout the next season. A permanent award is also presented to the top school. Individually engraved plaques are awarded to each school. Franklin Mint Federal Credit Union and Kimberly-Clark Corporation Chester Operations sponsor awards for each team.

The Partners in Education Celebration was started in 2005. What was once a luncheon honoring the three top teams, became a 600-person banquet honoring all of the Delco Hi-Q participants. The dinner is held annually and is presented by the Foundation and DCIU. Jeopardy host Alex Trebek served as the guest speaker and 6ABC's Action News anchor Rick Williams was master of ceremonies for the first celebration.

DCIU and Franklin Mint Federal Credit Union started the Delco Hall of Honor in the same year. Its purpose is to honor past participants and supporters and to provide role models for current Hi-Q participants Another new tradition began in 2005, DCIU and FMFCU partnered with the Delaware County Daily Times to start the tradition of the All Delco Hi-Q Team. Donna Zerby was the first inductee into the Hall of Honor and considered it the greatest honor of her 42-year Hi-Q career.

After the passing of Donna in 2005, Ginger Beaumont agreed to serve as director for the 2005/06 season. Mrs. Beaumont had previously spent six years coordinating the Delaware County program under the direction of Mrs. Zerby. The 2005/06 season was dedicated in memory of Donna and her 42-year association with Hi-Q. The revolving championship trophy was renamed the "Donna Zerby Trophy."

In 2006, Franklin Mint Federal Credit Union signed an agreement with DCIU to provide question resources and Program Directors to Delco Hi-Q. Ginger Beaumont remained with Hi-Q and served as Co-Director with Rick Durante of FMFCU until 2007.

In 2008, Delaware County Intermediate Unit and Franklin Mint Federal Credit Union became co-sponsors of the program.

As of the 2018/19 Season Rick Durante of Franklin Mint Federal Credit Union serves as Director and Quizmaster, Danielle Griffin is Assistant Director, and production engineer is Dave Bramble from Delaware County Intermediate Unit.

In addition to the participating schools’ support, primary corporate sponsors are Franklin Mint Federal Credit Union and the Wilbur C. and Betty Lea Henderson Foundation Valedictorian sponsor is Kimberly-Clark Corporation. Contributors and supporters for the 2008/2009 season are the Delaware County Daily Times.

== Finalists 1949–2026 ==
The first-, second-, and third-place finalists from 1949 to 2026 are as follows:

Year	First place	Second place	Third place
1949	Media*	Swarthmore*	Collingdale*
1950	Upper Darby High School	Media*	Swarthmore*
1951	Upper Darby High School	Swarthmore*	Media*
1952	Swarthmore*	Nether Providence*	Upper Darby High School
1953	Sharon Hill*	Saint James*	Swarthmore*
1954	Swarthmore* and Nether Providence* (tie)	Chester High School	
1955	Upper Darby High School	Haverford High School	Lansdowne-Aldan*
1956	Swarthmore*	Springfield High School	Nether Providence*
1957	Lansdowne-Aldan* and Swarthmore* (tie)	Chester High School	
1958	Upper Darby High School	Chester High School	Swarthmore*
1959	Upper Darby High School	Interboro High School	Penncrest High School
1960	Swarthmore*	Upper Darby High School	Ridley High School
1961	Penncrest High School	Eddystone*	Upper Darby High School
1962	Upper Darby High School	Penncrest High School	Springfield High School
1963	Haverford High School	Swarthmore*	Upper Darby High School
1964	Penncrest High School	Haverford High School	Springfield High School
1965	Haverford High School	Lansdowne-Aldan*	Radnor High School
1966	Swarthmore*	Marple Newtown High School	Penncrest High School
1967	Haverford High School	Radnor High School	Interboro High School
1968	Haverford High School	Chichester High School	Interboro High School
1969	Haverford High School	Radnor High School	Upper Darby High School
1970	Upper Darby High School	Chester High School and Marple Newtown High School (Tie)	
1971	Upper Darby High School	Chester High School	Radnor High School
1972	Marple Newtown High School	Springfield High School	Upper Darby High School
1973	Upper Darby High School	Haverford High School	Nether Providence*
1974	Haverford High School	Collingdale*	Lansdowne-Aldan*
1975	Radnor High School	Lansdowne-Aldan*	Darby-Colwyn*
1976	Radnor High School	Marple Newtown High School	Upper Darby High School
1977	Swarthmore*	Radnor High School	Garnet Valley High School
1978	Garnet Valley High School	Swarthmore*	Radnor High School
1979	Cardinal O'Hara High School	Haverford High School	Marple Newtown High School
1980	Swarthmore*	Cardinal O'Hara High School	Monsignor Bonner High School
1981	Haverford High School	Swarthmore*	Garnet Valley High School
1982	Haverford High School	Springfield High School	Garnet Valley High School
1983	Nether Providence*	Upper Darby High School	Ridley High School
1984	Radnor High School	Marple Newtown High School	Springfield High School
1985	Springfield High School	Radnor High School	Penncrest High School
1986	Radnor High School	Springfield High School	Haverford High School
1987	Penncrest High School	Radnor High School	Garnet Valley High School
1988	Radnor High School	Springfield High School	Haverford High School
1989	Radnor High School	Marple Newtown High School	Cardinal O'Hara High School
1990	Penncrest High School	Radnor High School	Ridley High School
1991	Radnor High School	Penncrest High School	Springfield High School
1992	Radnor High School	Penncrest High School	Upper Darby High School
1993	Radnor High School	Monsignor Bonner High School	Strath Haven High School
1994	Penncrest High School	Radnor High School	Cardinal O'Hara High School
1995	Upper Darby High School	Radnor High School	Delaware County Christian School
1996	Radnor High School	Haverford High School	Penncrest High School
1997	Haverford High School	Penncrest High School	Marple Newtown High School
1998	Radnor High School	Penncrest High School	Garnet Valley High School
1999	Penncrest High School	Garnet Valley High School	Upper Darby High School
2000	Penncrest High School	Garnet Valley High School	Radnor High School
2001	Garnet Valley High School	Penncrest High School	Marple Newtown High School
2002	Garnet Valley High School	Marple Newtown High School	Penncrest High School
2003	Penncrest High School	Garnet Valley High School	Marple Newtown High School
2004	Marple Newtown High School	Penncrest High School	Garnet Valley High School
2005	Strath Haven High School	Penncrest High School	Garnet Valley High School
2006	Marple Newtown High School	Garnet Valley High School	Delaware County Christian School
2007	Marple Newtown High School	Penncrest High School	Garnet Valley High School
2008	Marple Newtown High School	Radnor High School	Penncrest High School
2009	Penncrest High School	Haverford High School	Radnor High School
2010	Penncrest High School	Garnet Valley High School	Haverford High School
2011	Garnet Valley High School	Penncrest High School	Chichester High School
2012	Garnet Valley High School	Penncrest High School	Delaware County Christian School
2013	Penncrest High School	Haverford High School	Marple Newtown High School
2014	Garnet Valley High School	Penncrest High School	Strath Haven High School
2015	Penncrest High School	Haverford High School	Garnet Valley High School
2016	Garnet Valley High School	Penncrest High School	Sun Valley High School
2017	Haverford High School	Radnor High School	Garnet Valley High School
2018	Haverford High School	Garnet Valley High School	Delaware County Christian School
2019	Garnet Valley High School	Radnor High School	Delaware County Christian School
2020	Garnet Valley High School	Radnor High School	Haverford High School
2021	Delaware County Christian School	Haverford High School	Garnet Valley High School
2022	Haverford High School	Garnet Valley High School	Marple Newtown High School
2023	Garnet Valley High School	Radnor High School	Delaware County Christian School
2024	Delaware County Christian School	Garnet Valley High School	Radnor High School
2025	Strath Haven High School	Marple Newtown High School	Delaware County Christian School
2026	Marple Newtown High School	Radnor High School	Upper Darby High School

*The champion schools no longer participate in Hi-Q because of school mergers.

== Washington State Hi-Q ==
Hi-Q competitions occur in Washington State, run and sponsored by Everett Community College. Currently, there are nine teams, classified by their size and athletic districts. Matches follow the same format as the Delco Hi-Q team, and Washington state champions participate in a national championship, between Pennsylvania, Wisconsin, and Alabama.

Everett Community College is the primary sponsor for the program in the Everett Region. The program also receives support from local community groups, businesses, and foundations. Additionally, participating schools contribute toward the program's funding. The Hi-Q Regional Coordinator from Everett Community College manages the program to meet objectives and ensure a positive experience for the students.

In 2012 Everett Community College dropped its funding for the Hi-Q program, but local schools have adopted the program. The program is now headed by Monroe High School. Participating schools as of October 2012 include Lynnwood High School, Edmonds Woodway High School, Henry M. Jackson High School, Archbishop Murphy High School, Stanwood High School, Meadowdale High School, Mountlake Terrace High School, Marysville Pilchuck High School, Marysville Getchell High School.

The 2020 champion was Archbishop-Murphy High School.

== Wisconsin/Michigan Hi-Q ==
Wisconsin/Michigan Hi-Q is a high school academic quiz competition in northeastern Wisconsin and Upper Peninsula Michigan. Eighteen local high school teams compete in annual seasons consisting of three rounds of regular season competition. Hi-Q was started by the Scott Paper Company in Delaware County, Pennsylvania, and has since expanded to include Wisconsin/Michigan, Pennsylvania, Washington, and Alabama.

Eighteen high school teams each compete in three regular season rounds, each team hosting one match. After three rounds, the cumulative points for each team's three rounds of competition are used to determine a team's ranking. The top two teams automatically qualify for the finals rounds, while the third, fourth, and fifth place teams each participate in one semi-finals round hosted by the third place school. The winner of that match then proceeds to face the first and second place teams in two finals rounds, one at the first place school and another at the second place school. The winner is the regional champion and from there moves into the National Championship round against schools from Pennsylvania, Alabama, and Washington.

Wisconsin/Michigan Hi-Q is currently sponsored by Farmers and Merchants Bank and Trust in Marinette and University of Wisconsin-Marinette. Just before the 2018-2019 season, the Kimberly-Clark Corporation announced that it would no longer sponsor the academic competition. Thomas Maxwell, current Vice President of Farmers and Merchants, has promised to cover all new costs due to this lost sponsor.

The eighteen high schools that compete in Wisconsin/Menominee Hi-Q encompass Florence, Marinette and Oconto counties of Wisconsin, and also Menominee and Dickinson counties of Upper Peninsula Michigan. The member schools include:

- Beecher/Dunbar/Pembine High School
- Carney-Nadeau High School
- Coleman High School
- Crivitz School District (Crivitz High School)
- Florence High School (Wisconsin)
- Gillett High School
- Lena High School
- Marinette High School
- Menominee High School
- Niagara High School
- Norway-Vulcan Area Schools (Norway High School)
- Oconto High School
- Oconto Falls High School (Oconto Falls, Wisconsin)
- Peshtigo High School
- St. Thomas Aquinas Academy (Marinette, Wisconsin)
- Stephenson High School
- Suring High School
- Wausaukee High School

These are the past regional finalists for Wisconsin/Michigan Hi-Q from 1977 to present.

Year	Regional Champion	2nd	3rd
1977	Oconto Falls	St. Thomas Aquinas	Marinette
1978	Marinette	St. Thomas Aquinas	Menominee
1979	St. Thomas Aquinas	Oconto	Menominee
1980	Coleman	Marinette	Oconto Falls
1981	St. Thomas Aquinas	Lena	Coleman
1982	Coleman	Marinette	Oconto Falls
1983	Marinette	St. Thomas Aquinas	Oconto
1984	Marinette	St. Thomas Aquinas	Niagara
1985	Coleman	St. Thomas Aquinas	Crivitz
1986	Crivitz	Menominee	Marinette
1987	Coleman	Crivitz	Wausaukee
1988	St. Thomas Aquinas	Menominee	Peshtigo
1989	Crivitz	Coleman	Wausaukee
1990	Marinette	Crivitz	Menominee
1991	Crivitz	Wausaukee	Marinette
1992	Marinette	Peshtigo	Menominee
1993	Marinette	Coleman	St. Thomas Aquinas
1994	Marinette	Peshtigo	Menominee
1995	Peshtigo	Marinette	Menominee
1996	Marinette	Peshtigo	Wausaukee
1997	Marinette	Peshtigo	Wausaukee
1998	Peshtigo	Marinette	St. Thomas Aquinas
1999	St. Thomas Aquinas	Peshtigo	Marinette
2000	Marinette	Peshtigo	Faith Baptist*
2001	Peshtigo	Marinette	St. Thomas Aquinas
2002	Peshtigo	Marinette	Gillett
2003	Crivitz	Marinette	Faith Baptist*
2004	Gillett	Marinette	Peshtigo
2005	Peshtigo	Marinette	Beecher/Dunbar/Pembine
2006	Gillett	Marinette	Peshtigo
2007	Marinette	Oconto Falls	Peshtigo
2008	Marinette	Wausaukee	Suring
2009	Peshtigo	Suring	Menominee
2010	Menominee	Wausaukee	Crivitz
2011	Wausaukee	Menominee	Oconto Falls
2012	Menominee	Wausaukee	Gillett
2013	Menominee	Marinette	Wausaukee
2014	Gillett	Menominee	Oconto Falls
2015	Menominee	Oconto Falls	Marinette
2016	Peshtigo	Marinette	Menominee
2017	Peshtigo	Marinette	Oconto
2018	Oconto	Marinette	Gillett
2019	Marinette	Gillett	Oconto

- The schools marked with an asterisk(*) are those that do not participate in Wisconsin/Michigan Hi-Q anymore.

== National Competition ==
The first National Competition took place in 1981. Teams representing Pennsylvania, Ohio, Wisconsin and Washington State competed in person in a series of matches held in Delaware County, Pennsylvania. The winner was Haverford High School. There would not be another national championship for thirty years.

National Competition resumed in 2011 and has continued to the present with the exception of the years 2013 and 2014 where no national competition was held. The Championship consists of a single match that is done via teleconference. The Wisconsin/Michigan regional championship competes in this at the UW-Green Bay-Marinette campus. Championship rounds are usually held in early April each year. The Pennsylvania champion often has also been the winners of the national competition, a streak that was broken in 2021 thanks to the heavily favored Baker High School team edging out a victory over the Thom Houghton-coached Delaware County Christian School, who won their first ever Delco championship since Hi-Q began in 1949 (first win in school history).

	Champion	2nd	3rd	4th
2011	Wausaukee, Wisconsin	Garnet Valley High School, Pennsylvania	Alma Bryant High School, Alabama	Monroe, Washington
2012	Menominee, Michigan	Garnet Valley High School, Pennsylvania	Alma Bryant High School, Alabama	Archbishop Murphy High School, Washington
2013	No National Competition Held			
2014	No National Competition Held			
2015	Penncrest High School, Pennsylvania	McGill–Toolen Catholic High School, Alabama	Menominee, Michigan	Arlington High School, Washington
2016	Garnet Valley High School, Pennsylvania	Peshtigo, Wisconsin	Henry M. Jackson High School, Washington	None
2017	Haverford High School, Pennsylvania	Davidson High School, Mobile, Alabama	Peshtigo, Wisconsin	Monroe, Washington
2018	Haverford High School, Pennsylvania	Stanwood High School, Washington	Davidson High School, Mobile, Alabama	Oconto High School, Wisconsin
2019	Garnet Valley High School, Pennsylvania	Alma Bryant High School, Alabama	Stanwood High School, Washington	Marinette High School, Wisconsin
2021	Baker High School, Alabama	Delaware County Christian School, Pennsylvania	Marysville Getchell High School, Washington	None
2023	Garnet Valley High School, Pennsylvania	Crivitz High School, Wisconsin	Baker High School, Alabama	Monroe, Washington
2024	Delaware County Christian School, Pennsylvania	Monroe High School, Washington	Gillett High School, Wisconsin	Murphy High School, Alabama
