= Baker High School (Alabama) =

Public high school in Mobile, Alabama

Coordinates: 30.67130°N 88.25227°W

Location
- 8901 Airport Blvd; Mobile, Alabama 36608; United States

Information
- Type: Public
- Motto: Striving for Excellence Through the Quest of Knowledge
- Established: 1903 (123 years ago)
- CEEB code: 012525
- Principal: Jason Smith
- Teaching staff: 132.00 (FTE)
- Grades: 9-12
- Enrollment: 2,271 (2024–2025)
- Student to teacher ratio: 17.20
- Education system: Mobile County Public School System
- Colors: Navy blue and white
- Mascot: Buzz the Hornet
- Newspaper: Hornet Herald
- Yearbook: The Hornet
- Website: www.bakerhighschool.com

Baker High School is a four-year public high school located in unincorporated Mobile County, Alabama and is operated by the Mobile County Public School System. The school educates students in grades 9-12. Baker High School is the largest high school in Mobile County with 2,421 students enrolled and is the second largest school in the state of Alabama.

== History ==
Baker School was established in 1903. It was originally a one classroom school for grades 1-12. In 1927, the school became an official part of the Mobile County Public School System. This change provided resources for the campus, and several new buildings were built. In 1930, the building to the right of the original schoolhouse became the main building. The student body grew rapidly, so much so that a secondary building had to be built behind the original structure. In the 1960s, the school was split in two, with lower and upper class levels. Additional buildings were built, with the lower elementary school absorbing the original building and a two-story building built for the high school. Later, after the school districts were reformed, the elementary school would be renamed to Elsie Collier Elementary and moved to Snow Road. The old buildings became Causey Middle School. Causey was later moved to Snow Road, and the old Causey buildings were once again added as part of Baker High School. In early 2008, the school system decided to demolish the 107-years-old building. The original structure that was once Baker School, then Baker Elementary, then Causey Middle, still remains and is now the Freshman Academy.

The current main building was built in the late 1970s to accommodate a growing West Mobile population. The building was built as a bomb/storm shelter with no exterior windows in the original design. The walls are steel reinforced concrete. A concourse connects the main structure to the gym and new auditorium. The school was remodeled starting in 2001 and ending in 2004. The gym was expanded 40 yards, an auditorium was built, the main building was repainted, walls replaced, a sprinkler system added, and new doors installed with windows, the football stadium was expanded to twice the previous capacity and two new buildings were added to the campus as a freshman annex. The school has its own baseball field, softball field, football and soccer stadium, basketball gym, track, and practice field for football, soccer, and band. The original building from 1903 was torn down in early 2008 and was listed as a historic landmark by Mobile County.

== Academics ==
Baker High School offers 21 AP courses to their students:

Arts

- AP 2-D Studio Art

English

- AP English Language and Composition
- AP English Literature and Composition

History and Social Sciences

- AP European History
- AP Government and Politics
- AP Macroeconomics
- AP Psychology
- AP United States History
- AP World History

Math and Computer Science

- AP Calculus AB
- AP Calculus BC
- AP Computer Science A
- AP Computer Science Principles
- AP Precalculus
- AP Statistics

Sciences

- AP Biology
- AP Chemistry
- AP Environmental Science
- AP Physics 1

Capstone

- AP Research
- AP Seminar

== Student life ==
=== Publications ===
Baker High School publishes a semi-monthly newsletter called the Hornet Herald.

=== Uniforms ===
As part of the Mobile County Public School System, Baker High School conforms to a uniform policy.

Traditionally, Baker students wear a navy or white collar shirt, khaki pants, tennis shoes, black or brown, and an ID badge. On Fridays, the school allows an exception to wear a school spirit shirt instead of the collar shirt. The school bans hats and hoodies, but allows for hoodless jackets that are navy, gray, white, black, or issued by the school. The school also bans opaque backpacks.

=== Academic competitions ===
Baker High School became the first ever school from Alabama to win a nationwide Hi-Q championship, narrowly beating out Pennsylvania's Delaware County Christian School for the title in 2021 by a single point. Baker won the match on the final question in mathematics.

Baker High School's Scholars Bowl academic team, known as quiz bowl elsewhere, saw a period of success lasting from 2019 to 2024, on both the state and national levels. Before 2019, Baker's Scholars Bowl team competed exclusively, with few exceptions, in the annual Mobile County Scholars Bowl Tournament hosted by Coastal Alabama Community College. Resources were divided between the Scholar’s Bowl team and Baker's Hi-Q team; prior to 2019, Baker placed disproportionate focus on the latter. Linda Keller coached the team until 2019, when assistant coach Tonya Parker assumed the position of head coach.

2020 saw Baker's first and only appearance at a History Bowl competition. With sponsor Barbara Waltsgott, the team participated in Alabama's regional History Bowl competition at Spain Park High School on March 7 and placed 1st in the Varsity division, narrowly defeating Hoover in the finals by a score of 250 to 240. The 10 point difference was the smallest possible margin of victory using History Bowl scoring.

Baker's year of breakout success was halted by the COVID-19 pandemic, which resulted in the school's closing for the rest of the school year and the cancellation of the rest of the season's state and national tournaments.

== Feeder schools ==
The following middle schools feed into Baker High School:

- Causey Middle School
- Denton Middle School
- Collier Elementary
- Dawes 3-5 Elementary
- Hutchens K-2 Elementary
- O Rourke Elementary School
- Taylor-White Elementary School
- H.L. Sonny Callahan School for Deaf and Blind

== Notable alumni ==
- Bryce Cain, college football wide receiver for the Auburn Tigers
- Blaine Clausell, former offensive tackle for the National Football League
- Curry Barker, filmmaker of Obsession
- Flo Milli, rapper and singer-songwriter
- Jordan Patterson, Major League Baseball (MLB) player for the Colorado Rockies
- Labaron Philon Jr., college basketball player for the Alabama Crimson Tide
- Dewarick Spencer, professional basketball player Zamalek of the Egyptian Basketball Super League
- Kimberly Wimmer, actress, singer, and educator
