= Delaware County Christian School =

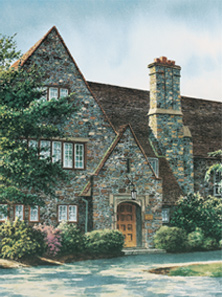

Location
- Newtown Square, Pennsylvania; United States
- 39.999158°N 75.38371°W

Information
- Type: Co-ed Day School
- Motto: We prepare our students for a life of impact through an innovative and exemplary education rooted in Christ.
- Religious affiliation: Evangelical Christian
- Established: 1950
- Head of School: Mr. Daniel Steinfeld
- Faculty: 130
- Enrollment: 950
- Average class size: 16-24
- Student to teacher ratio: 11 to 1
- Campus: Suburban
- Colors: Green and White
- Athletics: 20 Varsity sports, 13 interscholastic sports in Middle School
- Athletics conference: PIAA District One and Bicentennial Athletic League
- Mascot: Knight
- Website: Delaware County Christian School

Delaware County Christian School (DCCS, or just DC) is a pre-K to twelfth independent, coeducational, interdenominational day school with an enrollment of approximately 950 students located on two campuses in Newtown Square and Devon, Pennsylvania in the United States. The school's official mission is "to educate students who will serve God and impact the world through biblical thought and action."

Originally only at the Malin Road campus on the grounds of the George W. Strawbridge, Jr. estate, it expanded in 1968 with the purchase of the Alice Grim school at Bishop Hollow Rd. and West Chester Pike for grades K-5. In 2009, DC made an arrangement with The Episcopal Academy to exchange campuses which allowed DC to move the Elementary program to the more spacious and accommodating facility in Devon, PA.

Until 2007, DC was a member of the Southern Chester County League (SCCL). Almost the entire SCCL was absorbed into the Ches-Mont League except for Garnet Valley High School, Devon Preparatory School, and DC (the latter two were the league's smallest members). For the 2008-2009 academic year DC, joined the Bicentennial League rejoining former SCCL rival Devon Prep. The school's mascot is The Knight and its colors are green and white. The Varsity boys lacrosse team is currently a part of the Tri-County League.

== History ==
In 1949, a group of parents met together, sharing the belief that their children should be educated in a Christian environment. These parents were determined to start holding classes by September of the next year (1950). That fall, Delaware County Christian School opened to enroll 48 families, 58 students in grades K-5. For the next few years, classes met in the basement of the First Presbyterian Church of Springfield with a staff of four teachers.

DC first moved to Newtown Square with the purchase of the 11-acre (45,000 m^{2}) George Strawbridge Estate in 1955. In 1964, the school took on its first building project: a gymnasium-auditorium (now the upper gym). When the gym was complete, DC held the first DC Invitational Boys Basketball Tournament, the oldest continuous Christian high school basketball tournament in the United States. Over the next 15 years, DC would acquire five adjacent acres and build the High School building (formerly called the Science building) and the Lower Gym/Middle School building (formerly the Elementary building).

Running out of space to build, DC needed more space for the growing enrollment. Marple Newtown School District was selling the Alice Grimm School at 2 Bishop Hollow Road, about a mile from the existing campus. DC, not wanting to let such a perfect opportunity go to waste, purchased the campus for elementary classes in 1983.

Starting in the 1990s, DC's construction projects began to focus toward the artistic sides of modern education. In 1994, the Art Building (officially called The Lowrie Annex, after one of DC's headmasters) was built on the Malin Road (upper) campus to move art classes out of the basement of the Strawbridge Mansion. The art building, designed by DC art teacher Linda Unger, provided two art rooms (one for middle school and one for high school), a drama room, a dark room for photography, and an additional classroom.

In the interest of furthering the arts even more, DC broke ground on the Arthur and Nancy DeMoss Center for Worship and the Arts in the summer of 1999. The new building, connected to the upper gym, adjacent to the Mansion, houses a 554-seat auditorium, music room, bigger drama room, computer lab (computers have since been moved to the high school building), kitchen and a large room (called the "Commons Room", or "CR") principally for study halls and wrestling practices. For the 2008-2009 school year the kitchen was upgraded to be able to offer hot lunches for sale in the CR.

In early 2009 DC completed a property negotiation that would exchange the Alice Grimm/Bishop Hollow Campus and a cash sum for a campus in Devon. This Devon campus, originally the Haas Estate (as in Rohm & Haas), had been used as an elementary school by The Episcopal Academy, which moved all of its students to a new campus in 2009. DC made notable changes to the interior of the Devon Campus upon purchase, principally to expand some classrooms, allowing for a raised student cap and increased class size. [DC has an average class-section size of 24, while Episcopal had 18 at Devon.] This move provided DC with new standards of facilities that were physically impossible at the Bishop Hollow Campus, in the center of bustling Newtown Square. Amenities include a full-size gym with locker rooms, ample field space, a chapel, air conditioning (a notable feature lacking at the previous campus) and more classrooms, allowing for growth in the DC elementary program.

== Notable alumni ==
- Robert Lukens, President of the Chester County Historical Society (2011–2015)
