= Jonah Jackson =

American football player (born 1997)

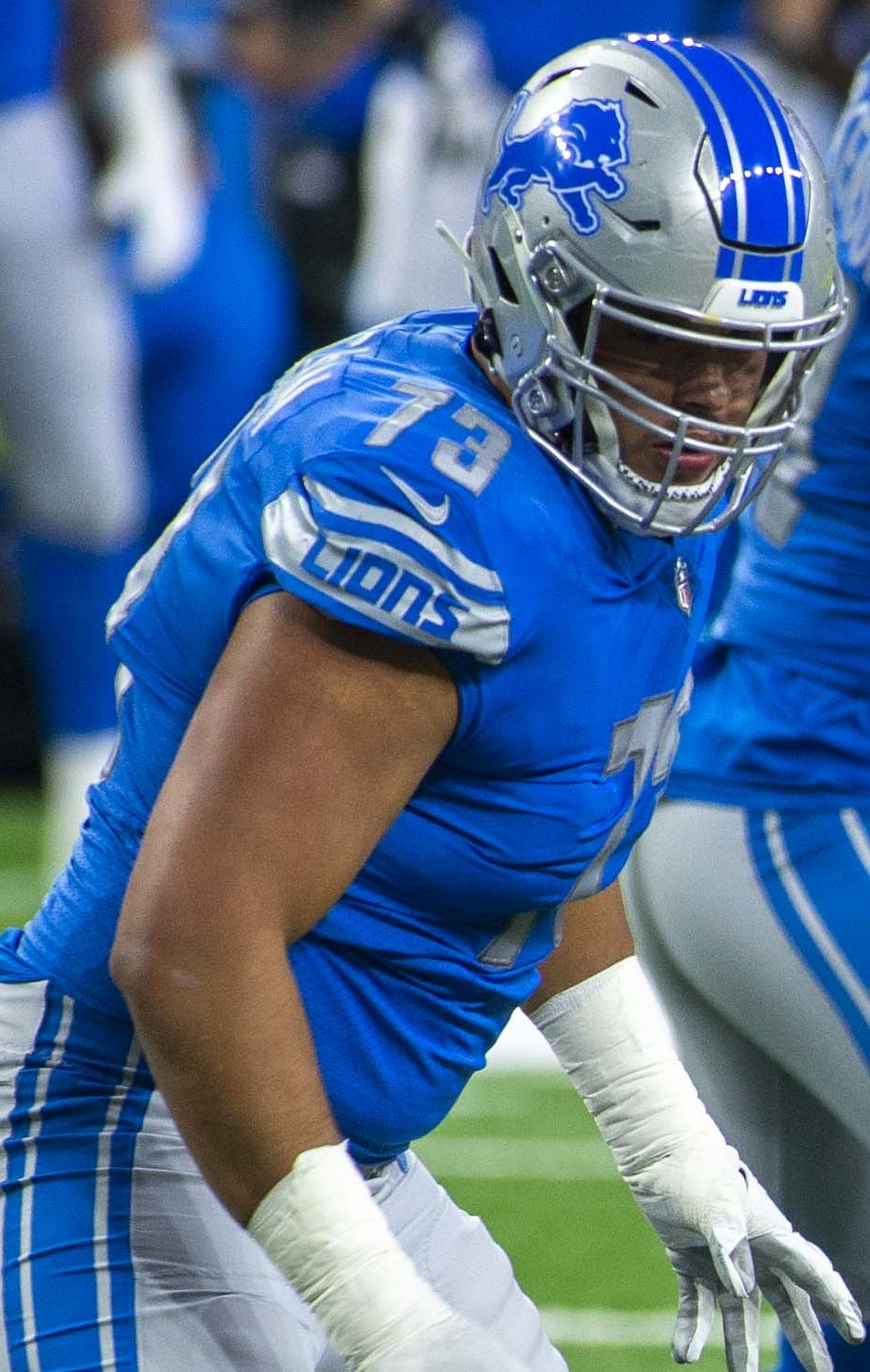
- Jackson with the Detroit Lions in 2020

No. 73 – Chicago Bears
- Position: Guard
- Roster status: Active

Personal information
- Born: February 5, 1997 (age 29); Media, Pennsylvania, U.S.
- Listed height: 6 ft 3 in (1.91 m)
- Listed weight: 319 lb (145 kg)

Career information
- High school: Penncrest (Media)
- College: Rutgers (2015–2018); Ohio State (2019)
- NFL draft: 2020: 3rd round, 75th overall pick

Career history
- Detroit Lions (2020–2023); Los Angeles Rams (2024); Chicago Bears (2025–present)

Awards and highlights
- Pro Bowl (2021); First-team All-Big Ten (2019)

Career NFL statistics as of 2025
- Games played: 78
- Games started: 78
- Stats at Pro Football Reference

Jonah Jackson (born February 5, 1997) is an American professional football guard for the Chicago Bears of the National Football League (NFL). He played college football for the Ohio State Buckeyes and Rutgers Scarlet Knights. He has previously played for the Detroit Lions.

== Early life ==
Jackson grew up in Media, Pennsylvania. He started his football career at an early age playing for the Rose Tree Colts. He continued playing football into high school, attending Penncrest High School. He was named first-team All-Central Athletic League and first-team All-Delaware County as a senior.

== College career ==
Jackson spent the first four seasons of his collegiate career at Rutgers University. He redshirted his true freshman season and played in all 12 of the Scarlet Knights games the next season, mostly on the field goal protection unit. Jackson played center as a redshirt sophomore, playing in six games and starting five contests before suffering a season ending injury. As a redshirt junior, Jackson started 11 games at right guard though he missed one game due to injury and was named honorable mention All-Big Ten Conference. Following the season, he announced that he would be leaving Rutgers as a graduate transfer, eventually choosing to attend Ohio State after visiting Oklahoma.

Jackson played his final season for the Ohio State Buckeyes, starting all of the Buckeyes games at left guard and garnering first-team All-Big Ten honors.

== Professional career ==
Pre-draft measurables
Height	Weight	Arm length	Hand span	Wingspan	40-yard dash	10-yard split	20-yard split	20-yard shuttle	Three-cone drill	Vertical jump	Broad jump	Bench press
6 ft 3 1/2 in (1.92 m)	306 lb (139 kg)	33 1/2 in (0.85 m)	10 1/2 in (0.27 m)	6 ft 5 7/8 in (1.98 m)	5.23 s	1.84 s	3.01 s	5.02 s	7.83 s	26.0 in (0.66 m)	8 ft 2 in (2.49 m)	28 reps
All values from NFL Combine

=== Detroit Lions ===
Jackson was selected in the third round, No. 75 overall, by the Detroit Lions in the 2020 NFL draft. On June 24, 2020, the Lions signed Jackson to a four-year contract. Jackson was named the Lions starting right guard going into his rookie season. Jackson made his NFL debut on September 13, 2020, in the season opener against the Chicago Bears, starting at right guard and playing 90% of the Lions offensive snaps. Jackson has started 32 of a possible 33 games through his first 2 seasons in the league. He missed the Lions week 15 matchup against the Arizona Cardinals due to a back injury.

Jackson was selected to play in the 2022 Pro Bowl as an injury replacement.

=== Los Angeles Rams ===
On March 14, 2024, Jackson signed a three-year, $51 million contract with the Los Angeles Rams. He was named the Rams starting center in Week 1, his first snaps at the position in his career. He fractured his scapula in Week 2 and was placed on injured reserve on September 18, 2024. He was activated on November 11.

=== Chicago Bears ===
On March 12, 2025, Jackson was traded to the Chicago Bears in exchange for a sixth-round pick (via Houston) in the 2025 NFL draft. The next day, Jackson and Chicago agreed to a one-year, $12.25 million contract extension.
