= Rose Tree Media School District =

School district in Pennsylvania, United States

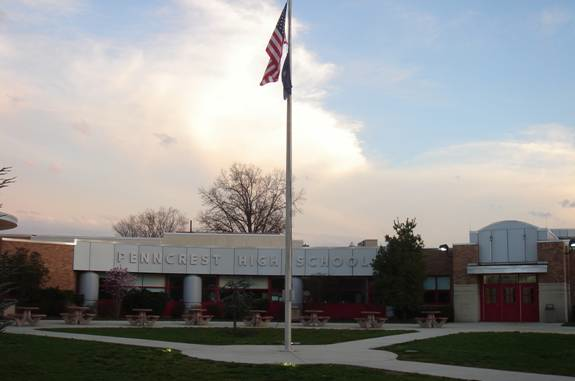
- Penncrest High School

Address
- 308 N Olive Street Media, Pennsylvania, 19063; United States
- Coordinates: 39.935°N 75.391°W

District information
- Motto: Children First, Always
- Grades: K-12
- Established: 1955; 70 years ago
- Superintendent: Joseph Meloche, Ed.D.
- Asst. superintendent(s): William Dougherty
- Business administrator: Vanessa Scott, Ed.D.
- NCES District ID: 4220550

Students and staff
- Students: 4,143 (2022–2023)
- Teachers: 300
- Student–teacher ratio: 13.8:1

Other information
- Website: www.rtmsd.org

Rose Tree Media School District (RTMSD) is a school district in Delaware County, Pennsylvania, headquartered in the Borough of Media. Rose Tree Media School District is serviced by the Delaware County Intermediate Unit. It has 4,143 students in its six schools. The superintendent is Joseph Meloche, Ed.D.

The district includes the following municipalities: Media Borough, Edgmont Township, Middletown Township, and Upper Providence Township.

In the school year 2022-2023, the district provided basic educational services to 4143 pupils with 300 teachers, 395 other staff, and 19.5 administrators. The district received more than $17 million in state funding in school year 2022–2023.

According to 2018-22 ACS-ED data, the district serves a resident population of 37,328. The median household income is $115,866, versus a state median income of $73,170, and national median income of $75,149.

== Schools ==
- Penncrest High School
- Springton Lake Middle School
- Glenwood Elementary School
- Indian Lane Elementary School
- Media Elementary School
- Rose Tree Elementary School

== Board of School Directors ==
Current Board Members:

- Theresa Napson-Williams - president
- Ken Dinitz - vice president
- Hillary Fletcher
- Jackie Gusic
- Susan Henderson-Utis
- Shelly Hunt
- Rob Kelly
- Karleen Krenicky
- Cameron Stephens
