= Bryce Cain =

American football player (born 2006)

No. 6 – Auburn Tigers
- Position: Wide receiver
- Class: Redshirt Sophomore

Personal information
- Born: February 14, 2006 (age 20)
- Listed height: 5 ft 10 in (1.78 m)
- Listed weight: 165 lb (75 kg)

Career information
- High school: Baker (Mobile County, Alabama)
- College: Auburn (2024–present)
- Stats at ESPN

Bryce Cain (born February 14, 2006) is an American football wide receiver for the Auburn Tigers of the Southeastern Conference.

== Early life ==
Cain attended Baker High School in Mobile County, Alabama, playing baseball through his first two years. He first joined the football team in the spring of 2022 and as a junior later that year, catching 26 passes for 497 yards and 5 touchdowns. By June 2023, he had received 24 college offers. Cain committed to Auburn in early June. In his senior season, he made 43 catches for 948 yards and 16 touchdowns.

== College career ==
=== Auburn ===
Cain committed to Auburn on June 13, 2023. He was one of four freshmen receivers recruited by Hugh Freeze in the class of 2024. The group of four was labelled as the "Freeze Four." In his first two seasons, he made six catches for 58 yards including three for 28 yards against Alabama in the 2025 Iron Bowl. After he confirmed his return in January 2026, Cain was the last remaining member of the "Freeze Four," with the three others transferring to other schools.

During spring practice in 2026, he expressed excitement for the upcoming season, saying "this is my year."
