= Robert Lukens =

American historian

Robert D. Lukens, Ph.D., (November 8, 1972 – August 2, 2015) was an American collection manager, historian and columnist. During his career, Lukens oversaw exhibitions at the United States Capitol Visitor Center in Washington D.C. He served as the President of the Chester County Historical Society from 2011 until 2015.

Lukens was born in Wynnewood, Pennsylvania, to William F. Lukens and Nancy Cardwell Lukens Heckman. He was a distant relative of Charles Lukens (1786–1825) and Rebecca Lukens (1794–1854), 19th century iron mill owners and business people, whose company would later become the Lukens Steel Company of Coatesville.

Lukens graduated from Delaware County Christian School. He received his bachelor's degree in history from Temple University and a master's degree in American history from the University of Tennessee. He later returned to Temple University to complete his doctorate in history. Additionally, he also held a certificate in non-profit management from the Non-Profit Center at La Salle University.

He first joined the Chester County Historical Society in 1993 as a volunteer while studying at Temple University. He became an intern in 1998 and finally joined the historical society's staff as a collections manager. Lukens left the Chester County Historical Society in 2003 to join the Chemical Heritage Foundation in Philadelphia as the foundation's Chief Curator. He was later promoted to the Head of Collections at the Chemical Heritage Foundation.

Lukens also worked at the Historic Yellow Springs in Chester Springs, Pennsylvania.

Lukens was hired by the United States Capitol Visitor Center as the center's Exhibits and Education Director. He oversaw the Capitol Visitor Center's public exhibitions, which were viewed by millions of tourists and staff annually.

In 2011, Lukens became the President of the Chester County Historical Society. Lukens oversaw the renovations and updating of the historical society's main building and other facilities. He also acquired state grants and other funding. Lukens hosted a History on Tap, a weekly radio show on WCHE, a radio station in West Chester, Pennsylvania. He published a weekly column in the Daily Local News focusing on the history of Chester County and local events. He served as the President of the Chester County Historical Society until his death in 2015.

Lukens also served as a Commonwealth Speaker of the Pennsylvania Humanities Council from 2008 to 2009 and the former vice-chairman of the Chester County Conference & Visitors Bureau.

Robert Lukens died at his home in West Chester, Pennsylvania, on August 2, 2015, at the age of 42 following a 2-year illness with cancer. Lukenswas survived by his wife of 13 years, Rebecca Gadsby Lukens, and their two children, Abbie and Finley.
