= Willie Sydnor =

American football player (born 1959)

No. 85
- Position: Wide receiver

Personal information
- Born: March 21, 1959 (age 67); Bryn Mawr, Pennsylvania, U.S.
- Listed height: 5 ft 11 in (1.80 m)
- Listed weight: 170 lb (77 kg)

Career information
- High school: Radnor (Radnor, Pennsylvania)
- College: Northwestern; Villanova; Syracuse
- NFL draft: 1982: undrafted

Career history
- Pittsburgh Steelers (1982)

Career NFL statistics
- Punt returns: 22
- Punt return yards: 172
- Stats at Pro Football Reference

George Ross "Willie" Sydnor (born March 21, 1959) is an American former professional football player who was a wide receiver for the Pittsburgh Steelers of the National Football League (NFL). He played college football for the Northwestern Wildcats, Villanova Wildcats and Syracuse Orange.

Sydnor is the son of George Sydnor, who was a track sprinter. He has three brothers, Reggie, Chris, and Chad. Willie was an All-Delco receiver at Radnor High School. The Raiders were 19–1 in his final two seasons, and he caught 51 passes during his varsity career. He was a captain of the 1976 undefeated team, and he helped the track team to the fifth fastest time in the nation.

Sydnor attended Northwestern University for one year, where he played football and ran track. After being pressured by the new coaching staff not to run track, he transferred to Villanova University, where he could play both sports. Running for Villanova on the 400 meters leg, he won the 1981 distance medley relay at the NCAA Division I Indoor Track and Field Championships. In April 1981, it was announced that Villanova was dropping its football program. Recruiters from several universities swarmed the campus for a few days, and Sydnor opted to transfer to Syracuse University. He made 29 catches for the Orange for 418 yards and two touchdowns. He graduated with a degree in psychology.

After going undrafted in 1982, Sydnor was signed by the Pittsburgh Steelers as a free agent but cut towards the end of training camp. He was considering joining the Canadian Football League and the United States Football League. Due to a series of injuries, he was re-signed by the Steelers. His season was shortened by the 1982 strike. By the time of the playoffs, he was the Steelers' chief punt returner, shining in the absence of Rick Woods. In eight games, Sydnor made 22 punt returns for 172 yards. His career ended due to injuries.

Sydnor lives in Rosemont, Pennsylvania, with his wife Kathy and four children. His daughter Shelby played field hockey for the University of Maryland.
