= Penncrest High School =

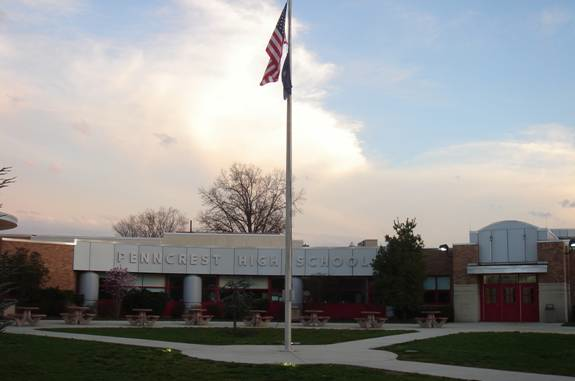

Location
- 134 Barren Road; Media, PA, Delaware County, Pennsylvania 19063; United States; 39.9229°N 75.4316°W

Information
- Established: 1955
- School district: Rose Tree Media School District
- NCES District ID: 4220550
- Superintendent: Joseph Meloche, Ed. D.
- CEEB code: 392287
- NCES School ID: 422055001942
- Principal: Edward Roth
- Teaching staff: 97.70 (FTE)
- Grades: 9–12
- Enrollment: 1,227 (2023–2024)
- Student to teacher ratio: 12.56
- Colors: Red and gold
- Fight song: On Wisconsin
- Athletics: Central League, AAA/AAAA,
- Mascot: Lion
- Team name: Roaring Lions
- National ranking: 2,110
- Feeder schools: Springton Lake Middle School
- Website: phs.rtmsd.org

Penncrest High School (PHS) is a public four-year comprehensive high school in Middletown Township, Delaware County, Pennsylvania, United States in the Philadelphia metropolitan area. It is a part of the Rose Tree Media School District.

The district, and therefore the high school's attendance boundary, includes the following municipalities: Middletown Township, Media, Edgmont Township, and Upper Providence Township.

== Demographics ==
As of the 2022-2023 school year, there were 1218 students enrolled in the school. Of these, there were 300 ninth-graders, 317 tenth-graders, 276 eleventh-graders, and 319 twelfth-graders. The majority, around 78.7%, of the school district identified as White, with 21.2% of students being minorities. Within this, 7.3% identified as Asian, 6.2% as two or more races, 4.7% as Black, 3.0% as Hispanic, and 0.1% as American Indian/Pacific Islander. The student body was 50% female and 50% male.

22.1% of the school was considered economically disadvantaged. 18.5% were enrolled in a special education program. 47% of Penncrest students took at least one AP Exam in May 2023.

== Extracurricular activities ==
=== Academic teams ===
- Hi-Q – the oldest academic quiz competition in the United States, began in 1948. Delco Champions (1999, 2000, 2003, 2009, 2010, 2013, 2015), National Champions (2015)
- Envirothon – PA State Champions (2000, 2002, 2004, 2005, 2006, 2008, 2009, 2010, 2011, 2014, 2015, 2016, 2017), North American Champions (2000, 2005, 2009, 2017)
- Physics Olympics – a regional competition combining problem solving and various construction oriented competitions. Penncrest holds two national records for consecutive championships and consecutive meets won.
- Science Olympiad – PA State Champions (2014), PA State 2nd Place finalists (2004, 2005, 2006, 2007, 2008, 2009, 2010, 2011, 2013); National results: 8th in 2004; 11th in 2005; 5th in 2006; 7th in 2007; 8th in 2008; 6th in 2009; 4th in 2010; 4th in 2011; 14th in 2013; 8th in 2014

=== Music ===
- Concert Band
- Wind Ensemble
- Roaring Lions Marching Band
- Orchestra
- Choir
- Jazz Band
- Jazz Lab
- Indoor Drumline
- Indoor Color Guard
- Symphonic Orchestra
- Pit Orchestra

=== Sports ===
For the 2018–2019 school year. Penncrest competed in 12 interscholastic boys' sports and 11 girls' sports including boys' baseball, basketball, cross country running, American football, golf, indoor and outdoor track and field, lacrosse, soccer, swimming and diving, tennis, and wrestling. Girls competed in basketball, cross country running, field hockey, indoor and outdoor track and field, lacrosse, softball, soccer, swimming and diving, tennis, and volleyball. Penncrest competes in the Central League, District One, of the Pennsylvania Interscholastic Athletic Association (PIAA).

In 2005, the ice hockey team won the state championship. In 2014, the boys' lacrosse team won the PIAA state championship.

== Notable alumni ==
- Jeff Ayars, American filmmaker and actor
- Stephen Bloom, a member of the Pennsylvania House of Representatives from 2011 to 2019.
- Gary Dauberman, American screenwriter and director, writer of It (2017) and It Chapter Two (2019).
- Paul DiMeo, cast member of Extreme Makeover: Home Edition
- Michael A. O'Donnell, Ph.D., award-winning author and international scholar.
- Kenneth A. Oye, political science professor at MIT and early contributor to regime theory
- Robert Engle, American economist and the winner of the 2003 Sveriges Riksbank Prize in Economic Sciences in Memory of Alfred Nobel
- Ronald Yeaw, US Navy SEAL and former commander of Seal Team Six
- Auston Trusty, professional soccer player for Celtic F.C. and United States men's national soccer team (2026 World Cup)
- Jonah Jackson, NFL player for the Chicago Bears
- Bill Whitaker, television journalist and a correspondent on the CBS News program 60 Minutes
- Bruce Roth, American chemist and the inventor of Lipitor(atorvastatin)
- Kate Fonshell, American distance runner, U.S. National 10,000m champion (1996) and Olympian (1996).
- Candace Finn Rocha, American lacrosse player, USA Lacrosse Hall of Fame inductee (1998), first woman Tewaaraton Legends Awardee (2016).
