= Garnet Valley High School =

Coordinates: 39.8669°N 75.5032°W

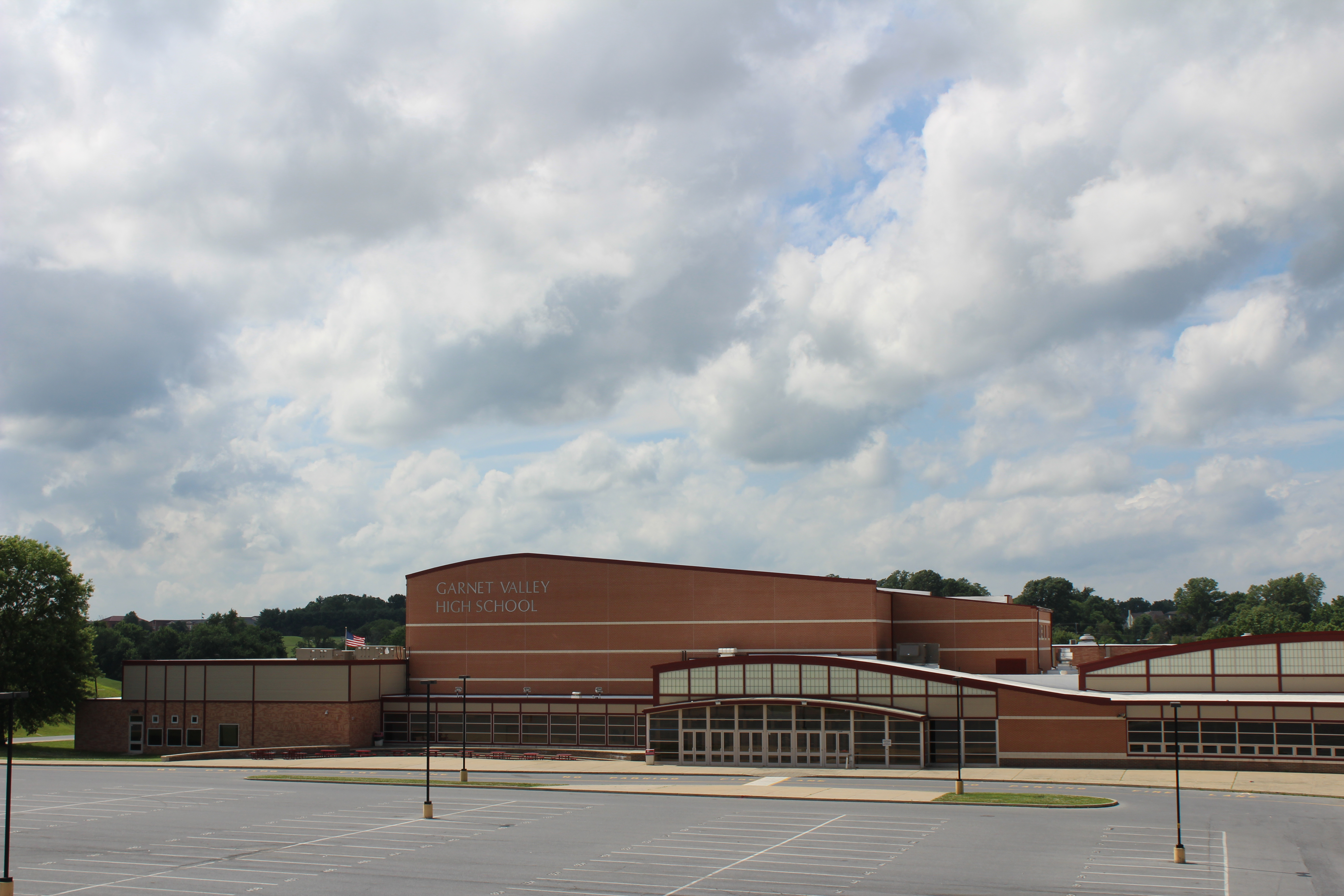
- Garnet Valley High School in 2017

Location
- 552 Smithbridge Rd; Glen Mills, Pennsylvania; United States

Information
- School type: Public, Secondary
- Motto: Treat others how you want to be treated
- School district: Garnet Valley School District
- Principal: Stephen Brandt
- Teaching staff: 116.70 (FTE)
- Grades: 9th - 12th
- Enrollment: 1,500 (2023–2024)
- Student to teacher ratio: 12.85
- Colors: Garnet and white
- Mascot: Jaguar
- Feeder schools: Garnet Valley Middle School
- Website: Garnet Valley High School

Garnet Valley High School is a four-year public school in Glen Mills, Pennsylvania, U.S.A. It is part of Garnet Valley School District.

== Hi-Q ==
Garnet Valley's Delco Hi-Q team won the championship in the 2010–2011, 2011–2012, and 2013–2014 seasons, and appeared in the semifinals in the 2012–2013 season. They won the Delco Championship and proceeded to win their first national crown in 2016. Garnet Valley has appeared in the championship match 19 times since 1977, taking first place 6 times during that period.

== Environmental Club ==
The GVHS Environmental Club is one of the school's many non-athletic student clubs. It has the stated goal of "provid[ing] students with opportunities to spend time outdoors while helping better the Garnet Valley community." The club has several projects which its members contribute to, including a nature trail and a compost bin. In January 2019 and 2020, the club hosted a "holiday tree drive", through which locals could drop off Christmas trees which would later be turned into wood chips and used in the club's nature trail. This event was advertised via the Bethel Township Facebook account.

After the school's Hi-Q team won the national competition in 2016, their winnings were donated to the environmental club.

== Athletics ==
In 2008, the Garnet Valley Athletics program transferred from the Southern Chester County League to the Central League. In 2011, the Girls Lacrosse team won the 1st ever PIAA State Championship in Garnet Valley school history. The following year, in 2012, they claimed a second consecutive PIAA State Championship. In 2014, the girls lacrosse team claimed a third PIAA State Championship. In 2015, the girls lacrosse team won their 4th PIAA State Championship (2 back to back Championships).

In 2016, the girls volleyball team won the first ever PIAA 4A State Championship in Garnet Valley school history.

In 2019, the cheerleading team won the first ever PIAA State Championship in Garnet Valley school history. They have also won districts 3 years in a row.

== Student performance ==
The Class of 2010 achieved average SAT scores that were significantly higher than state and national averages. The mean SAT critical reading score was 525, the mean SAT math score was 553, and the mean SAT writing score was 531. 94% of the Class of 2010 will continue with formal education, 75% of the class going on to 4-year colleges and 15% going to 2-year colleges or technical schools.

The School Student Performance Rating also received a 99.1 in 2014, being number 1 in Delaware County and 11 in the state. They are in the top 1% in the country.

== Notable alumni ==
- Thomas Weidley, United States Marine Corps major general
- April Margera, reality television personality
- Eugene Botes, professional swimmer
- Wellington Zaza, professional track athlete

== See also ==
- Garnet Valley School District
