= Central Athletic League =

- Association: Pennsylvania Interscholastic Athletic Association (PIAA)
- Founded: 1967; 58 years ago
- Sports fielded: 24
- No. of teams: 12
- Region: Greater Philadelphia
- Official website: Central League

The Central Athletic League, known colloquially as The Central League, is a high school sports league located in the suburbs of Philadelphia. Currently, the league consists of twelve high schools primarily from Delaware County with additional constituency from Chester and Montgomery counties.

== History ==
The Central League began play in the 1967 academic year. The founding member schools were Conestoga, Harriton, Haverford, Lower Merion, Marple Newtown, Penncrest, Radnor, Springfield, and Upper Darby high schools.

In 1969, Harriton departed for the Subrban 3 League and was replaced by Ridley. Strath Haven joined in 1983, and the league's current alignment was finalized in 2008 with the return of Harriton and the addition of Garnet Valley.

== Sports ==
The schools all compete in varsity high school sports in District I of the Pennsylvania Interscholastic Athletic Association, or the PIAA.

Season	Sports
Fall	Boys and Girls Cross Country, Field Hockey, Football, Golf, Boys and Girls Soccer, Girls Tennis, Girls Volleyball
Winter	Boys and Girls Basketball, Cheerleading, Boys and Girls Swimming and Diving, Boys and Girls Indoor Track, Wrestling
Spring	Baseball, Boys and Girls Lacrosse, Softball, Boys Tennis, Boys and Girls Track & Field

== Member schools ==
School	Location	Joined	Nickname	Colors
Conestoga High School	Tredyffrin, Pennsylvania	1967	Pioneers	
Garnet Valley High School	Glen Mills, Pennsylvania	2008	Jaguars	
Harriton High School	Rosemont, Pennsylvania	2008	Rams	
Haverford High School	Haverford Township, Pennsylvania	1967	Fords	
Lower Merion High School	Ardmore, Pennsylvania	1967	Aces, Bulldogs	
Marple Newtown High School	Newtown Square, Pennsylvania	1967	Tigers	
Penncrest High School	Middletown Township, Pennsylvania	1967	Lions	
Radnor High School	Radnor, Pennsylvania	1967	Raptors	
Ridley High School	Folsom, Pennsylvania	1969	Green Raiders	
Springfield High School	Springfield Township, Pennsylvania	1967	Cougars	
Strath Haven High School	Wallingford, Pennsylvania	1983	Panthers	
Upper Darby High School	Upper Darby, Pennsylvania	1967	Royals	
