= Blaine Clausell =

American football player (born 1992)

No. 75
- Position: Offensive tackle

Personal information
- Born: January 31, 1992 (age 34); Mobile, Alabama, U.S.
- Listed height: 6 ft 6 in (1.98 m)
- Listed weight: 330 lb (150 kg)

Career information
- High school: Baker (Mobile)
- College: Mississippi State
- NFL draft: 2015: undrafted

Career history
- Baltimore Ravens (2015)*; New England Patriots (2015)*; Baltimore Ravens (2015–2016)*; Washington Redskins (2016); Carolina Panthers (2016–2017); Arizona Cardinals (2018)
- * Offseason or practice squad member only

Career NFL statistics
- Games played: 2
- Stats at Pro Football Reference

Blaine Iman Clausell (born January 31, 1992) is an American former professional football player who was an offensive tackle for the Arizona Cardinals of the National Football League (NFL). He played college football for the Mississippi State Bulldogs, starting at left tackle for four years, and was signed by the Baltimore Ravens as an undrafted free agent in 2015.

== Professional career ==
=== Baltimore Ravens ===
Clausell signed with the Baltimore Ravens on May 2, 2015 after going undrafted in the 2015 NFL draft. On May 12, the Ravens announced Clausell would receive a $10,000 signing bonus, the highest of any Ravens undrafted free agent. On September 4, Clausell was waived by the Ravens.

=== New England Patriots ===
Clausell was signed to the New England Patriots' practice squad on September 7, 2015. On November 19, he was released by the Patriots.

=== Baltimore Ravens (second stint) ===
On November 20, 2015, Clausell was signed to the Baltimore Ravens' practice squad. He signed a reserve/future contract with the Ravens on January 4, 2016. On September 3, Clausell was released by the Ravens and was re-signed to the team's practice squad the following day.

=== Washington Redskins ===
Clausell signed with the Washington Redskins active roster on November 7, 2016. He was released by the Redskins on December 2.

=== Carolina Panthers ===
On December 13, 2016, Clausell was signed to the Carolina Panthers' practice squad. He signed a reserve/future contract with the Panthers on January 2, 2017.

On September 2, 2017, Clausell was waived by the Panthers and was signed to the practice squad the next day. He was promoted to the active roster on January 2, 2018. On August 31, Clausell was released by Carolina.

=== Arizona Cardinals ===
On September 2, 2018, Clausell was claimed off waivers by the Arizona Cardinals. He made his NFL regular season debut during the 2018 season, playing in two games for the Cardinals. He appeared in two snaps on offense and five snaps on special teams. On October 30, Clausell was waived.
