= WHHS =

Radio station at Haverford High School in Havertown, Pennsylvania

- Havertown, Pennsylvania; United States
- Broadcast area: Haverford Township, Delaware County, Pennsylvania
- Frequency: 99.9 MHz

Programming
- Format: Variety

Ownership
- Owner: Haverford High School

History
- First air date: December 6, 1949
- Former frequencies: 89.3 MHz (1948–1992); 107.9 MHz (1992–2005)
- Call sign meaning: W Haverford High School

Technical information
- Facility ID: 59344
- Class: D
- ERP: 9.5 watts
- HAAT: 49 meters (161 ft)
- Transmitter coordinates: 39°58′59.4″N 75°18′8.6″W

Links
- Website: www.whhs.org

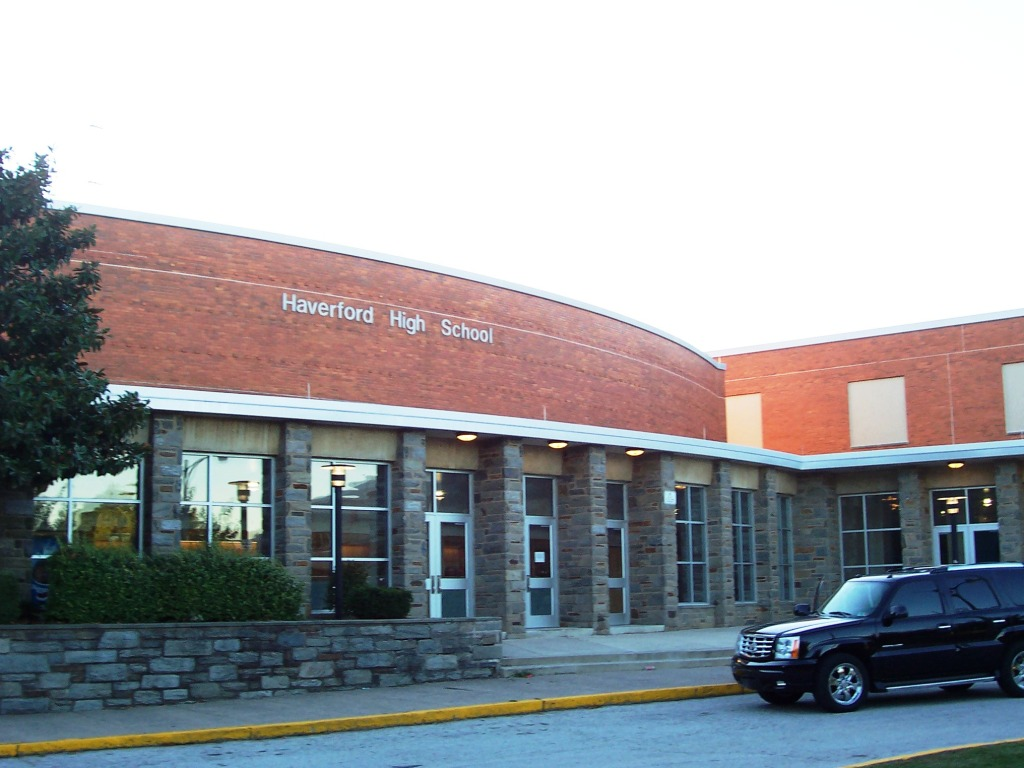
Haverford High School circa mid-2000s.

WHHS (99.9 FM) is a non-commercial educational FM radio station licensed to the School District of Haverford Township in Havertown, Pennsylvania (a suburb of Philadelphia), and run by the students of Haverford High School. Studios are located within the school, and the transmitter is located on top of the building.

Typical show formats include rock, Top 40, classic rock, rap/hip-hop, sports talk, political talk, and sometimes more eclectic genres like classical or jazz. Occasionally, shows feature live performances from local or school-based bands. Students apply for a radio show (usually 90 minutes long), and a typical show has 2-4 hosts. On the basis of interviews and previous experience with the station, students are chosen to fill several positions, including general manager, technical director, programming director, promotions director, music director, and sports director. The radio station provides an introduction into the radio or communications industries for students interested in careers in these fields.

== History ==
WHHS is the oldest high school-run radio station in the United States of America. The station was originally assigned to 89.3 MHz and was granted its first license on February 21, 1950. In 1992, the FCC forced the station to change frequencies to 107.9 MHz.

In 2004, a new radio station licensed to Radio One to serve Pennsauken, New Jersey and the Philadelphia market (WRNB, now WPPZ-FM) signed on, requiring WHHS to change frequencies again. With Radio One's help, WHHS moved to 99.9 MHz in 2005.

In 2006, the station began broadcasting live sporting events such as football and hockey. The station has broadcast election day specials and interviews with such politicians and Congressman Curt Weldon and Congressman elect Joe Sestak.

WHHS celebrated 70 years of broadcasting in 2019.
