= Bill Maas =

American football player (born 1962)

No. 63, 77
- Positions: Defensive tackle, defensive end

Personal information
- Born: March 2, 1962 (age 64); Newtown Square, Pennsylvania, U.S.
- Listed height: 6 ft 5 in (1.96 m)
- Listed weight: 265 lb (120 kg)

Career information
- High school: Marple Newtown (Newtown Square)
- College: Pittsburgh
- NFL draft: 1984: 1st round, 5th overall pick

Career history
- Kansas City Chiefs (1984–1992); Green Bay Packers (1993)

Awards and highlights
- NFL Defensive Rookie of the Year (1984); Second-team All-Pro (1986); 2× Pro Bowl (1986, 1987); PFWA All-Rookie Team (1984); Kansas City Chiefs Hall of Honor; First-team All-American (1982); Third-team All-American (1983); First-team All-East (1983)

Career NFL statistics
- Sacks: 40
- Touchdowns: 2
- Safeties: 2
- Stats at Pro Football Reference

William Thomas Maas (born March 2, 1962) is an American former professional football player who was a defensive tackle for the Kansas City Chiefs (1984–1992) and Green Bay Packers (1993) of the National Football League (NFL). Maas was selected to the Pro Bowl in 1986 and 1987. In 1984 Maas was named the NFL Rookie of the Year by the Associated Press. He worked as a commentator for Fox Sports from 1995 to 2007. From 1998 to 2001, he served as studio anchor and game analyst for NFL games.

== Early life ==
Bill's early years were spent in suburban Philadelphia where he grew up alongside his sister Lizanne (Annie), his brother Murray Xavier, and his adopted Vietnamese brother, Ngo.

Bill Maas played football at Marple Newtown High School but his athletic skills were overlooked, in part because of his team's lack of success on the field. During his senior year, the Tigers finished with a 1–9 record. The only school that expressed interest in him was the University of Pittsburgh, a college football powerhouse.

== College career ==
Maas spearheaded Pitt's defensive fronts of the early 1980s with his play at tackle. In 1980, he was part of an elite Pitt team that included future NFL stars Tim Lewis, Jimbo Covert, Chris Doleman, Dan Marino, Russ Grimm, Mark May, Hugh Green, and Rickey Jackson.

He established himself early when as a freshman he blocked a punt and recorded a sack in Pitt's 1980 Gator Bowl victory over South Carolina. Maas then became a starter for his remaining three years with the Panthers, earning first-team All-America honors in 1982 and third-team in 1983. Maas played in the East–West Shrine Game.

== Professional career ==
Maas was the Chiefs' first-round draft pick in 1984, the fifth player taken overall. He lived up to his first-round status, being named the NFL Defensive Rookie of the Year despite missing two games. After a career-high seven sacks in 1985, Maas matched that total the next season and was awarded his first Pro Bowl nod. He went back again to the Pro Bowl in the strike-shortened 1987 season after getting six sacks and scoring a touchdown off a fumble recovery. Maas got off to a fast start in 1988, getting four sacks and a safety in his first seven games. He then was injured in the eighth game and missed the rest of the season. The 1989 season was the first year in his career he did not have a sack, as it was shortened to 10 games because of injury. Maas did score the last touchdown of his career off a fumble. Kansas City moved him to defensive end in 1990. He had 5.5 sacks and a safety that season. After an injury-filled 1992 season, he joined the Green Bay Packers. He spent most of the year backing up John Jurkovic at nose tackle.

His 40 career sacks is tied with Mike Bell as the eighth most in Kansas City Chiefs history, as of 2020, and is the most by either a defensive tackle or nose tackle. Bill Maas is the first nose tackle in Chiefs history to make the Pro Bowl. He was the first Chief ever to win a Rookie of the Year Award. During his career, Maas won acclaim for his relentless pass rushing ability and was selected twice for the Pro Bowl, as well as being named NFL Defensive Rookie of the Year.

After retiring from pro football, he spent 12 years broadcasting NFL games for Fox Sports.

== Legal problems ==
On July 6, 2007, Maas was arrested for drug and weapons possession after a traffic stop in East Peoria, Illinois. He was released from jail two days later.

The USA Today reported August 7, 2007: Maas, 45, and a passenger in his Hummer, Sarah J. Murphy, 27, were arrested late Friday by Illinois State Police. During the stop on Illinois Route 116, police indicated that Maas seemed nervous, which prompted police to request a search of the vehicle, to which Maas consented.

The search turned up a .22-caliber revolver, five grams of suspected marijuana, six grams of suspected cocaine and 28 pills of Ecstasy, according to police. Both Maas and Murphy were charged with possession of a controlled substance and possession of marijuana. Maas was also booked on a charge of unlawful use of a weapon.

On September 5, 2007, Maas was questioned and released following an incident at Kansas City International Airport in which authorities reportedly found a loaded 9mm Glock in a bag brought by the former football player to the airport before attempting to board a plane. The gun was confiscated at a screening station and Maas was taken to the airport police station for questioning, at which point he claimed to have picked up the wrong bag before coming to the airport.
