= Radnor High School =

Coordinates: 40.0398°N 75.3596°W

Location
- 130 King of Prussia Road; Radnor, Pennsylvania 19087; United States

Information
- Type: Public high school
- Founded: 1893
- School district: Radnor Township School District
- Principal: Joseph MacNamara
- Staff: 91.00 (FTE)
- Grades: 9–12
- Enrollment: 1,145 (As of April 2025)
- Student to teacher ratio: 13.14
- Colors: Maroon and White
- Team name: Raptors
- Website: https://rhs.rtsd.org/

Radnor High School is a public high school in Radnor, Pennsylvania. Of all high schools in Pennsylvania, Radnor is ranked 3rd by U.S. News & World Report, and 1st by the Pennsylvania Department of Education.

== Overview ==
Radnor High School is the only public high school in Radnor Township, Pennsylvania. It is part of the Radnor Township School District. Located 13 miles west of Philadelphia, Radnor Township lies along the Philadelphia Main Line. Radnor High School offers many AP and honors courses.

== Student body ==
The high school has 1,145 students in grades 9 through 12 as of April 2025. The student body is mostly white, with a total minority enrollment of 23%. 90% of former Radnor students go on to graduate from four-year colleges and universities.

As of the 2021-2022 school year, the demographics of the student body were as follows:

Group	Number of students	Percent
All	1,165	100%
White	809	69.4%
Black	65	5.6%
Asian	185	15.9%
Hispanic	79	6.8%
Two or More Races	27	0.2%
Male	612	52.5%
Female	553	47.5%

== Extracurricular and athletic activities ==
Radnor offers a wide range of extracurricular and athletic activities with teams competing in the Central League. Their many clubs for students include Model UN, Robotics, Hi-Q, and Future Business Leaders of America (FBLA).

== National recognition ==
U.S. News & World Report ranks Radnor as the 3rd best public high school in Pennsylvania, and the PA Department of Education ranks it 1st. In 2012, The Daily Beast ranked Radnor as one of the top 500 public high schools in the nation.

== Notable alumni ==
- Jan Berenstain '41 co-authored the classic Berenstain Bears book series.
- Emlen Tunnell '42 played professional football for the New York Giants and the Green Bay Packers.
- Anna Moffo '50 was a prominent soprano opera singer.
- Ted Dean '56 played for the Philadelphia Eagles.
- Randal Kleiser '64 directed the musical film Grease.
- Lance Clemons '65 played in the major leagues.
- Jane Barkman '69 won bronze and gold medals in swimming in the 1968 Mexico City Olympics and another gold in the 1972 Munich games.
- Thomas F. Wilson '77 played Biff Tannen in the movie trilogy Back to the Future.
- Lee Daniels '78 directed Precious: Based on the Novel "Push" by Sapphire (2009) and The Butler (2013)
- Michael Hausman '78 founded and drummed for 'Til Tuesday. He currently manages Aimee Mann and Marc Cohn.
- Willie Sydnor '77 played football for the Pittsburgh Steelers
- Joshua Wurman '78 is a leading meteorologist who invented Doppler On Wheels mobile radars.
- Beth Kephart '78 is the author of thirteen novels and was a finalist for the National Book Awards.
- David Brooks '79 is an author and columnist for the New York Times.
- Mary Ellen Clark '81 won bronze medals in platform diving in the Barcelona and Atlanta Olympic Games.
- Kelly Corrigan '85 is a bestselling author.
- Paul Anthony Stewart '88 is an actor.
- John DeFilippo ‘96 was the quarterbacks coach for the Super Bowl-winning Philadelphia Eagles. Is now the quarterbacks coach for the Chicago Bears
- Alex Ross Perry '02 directed Listen Up Philip and Queen of Earth, wrote Christopher Robin (film).
- Scott Kahoe ‘05 played professional lacrosse for the Boston Cannons and Florida Launch
- Sunil Tripathi '08 Misidentified suspect of Boston Marathon bombing
- Ari Staprans Leff '12 is a multi-platinum singer, songwriter, and record producer.
- Mark Zandi, an American economist who is the chief economist of Moody's Analytics.

== In popular culture ==
- Radnor High School was said to have been an inspiration for Rydell High in Grease as director Randal Kleiser attended Radnor.
