= Chester County History Center =

Historical society and museum in West Chester, Pennsylvania

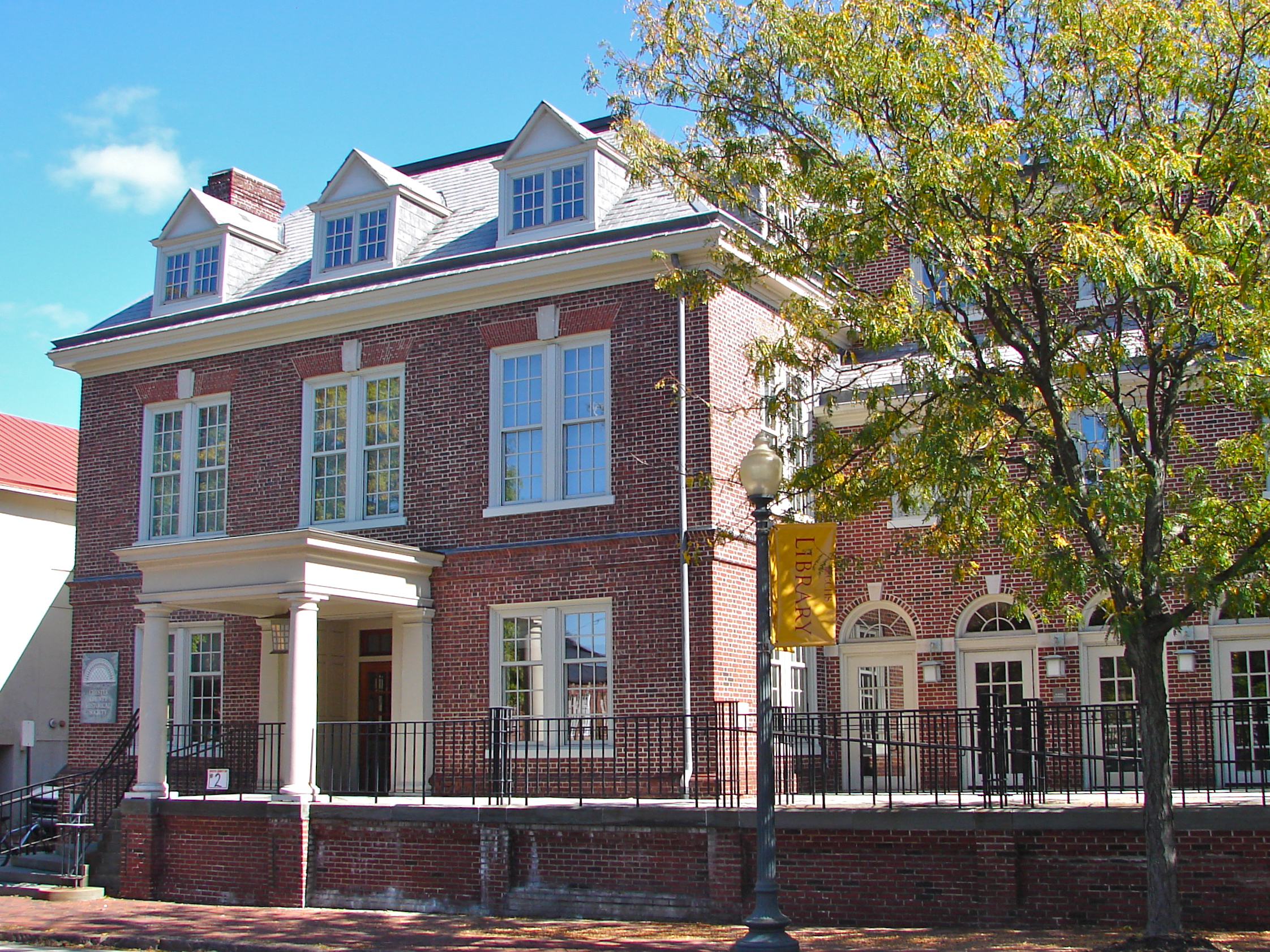
- Established: 1893
- Location: 225 North High Street; West Chester, Pennsylvania
- Type: Historical/Museum
- Director: Conor Hepp
- Website: mycchc.org
- Horticultural Hall
- U.S. Historic district – Contributing property
- Built: 1848
- Architect: Thomas U. Walter
- Part of: West Chester Downtown Historic District (ID85001447)
- Designated CP: July 2, 1985

Chester County History Center (CCHC), formerly the Chester County Historical Society, is a nonprofit historical society, founded in 1893, dedicated to collecting, preserving, and exhibiting the history of Chester County, Pennsylvania, and the surrounding area. The History Center is located at 225 North High Street in downtown West Chester.

== Collections ==
The museum collection contains more than 80,000 artifacts, with strengths in southeastern Pennsylvania furniture, textiles, and decorative arts. The library collection contains over 500,000 manuscripts, 80,000 photographs, and 20,000 volumes. Since the early 1980s, the CCHC has partnered with the county government to administer the Chester County Archives, spanning 300 years of county records.

== Buildings ==
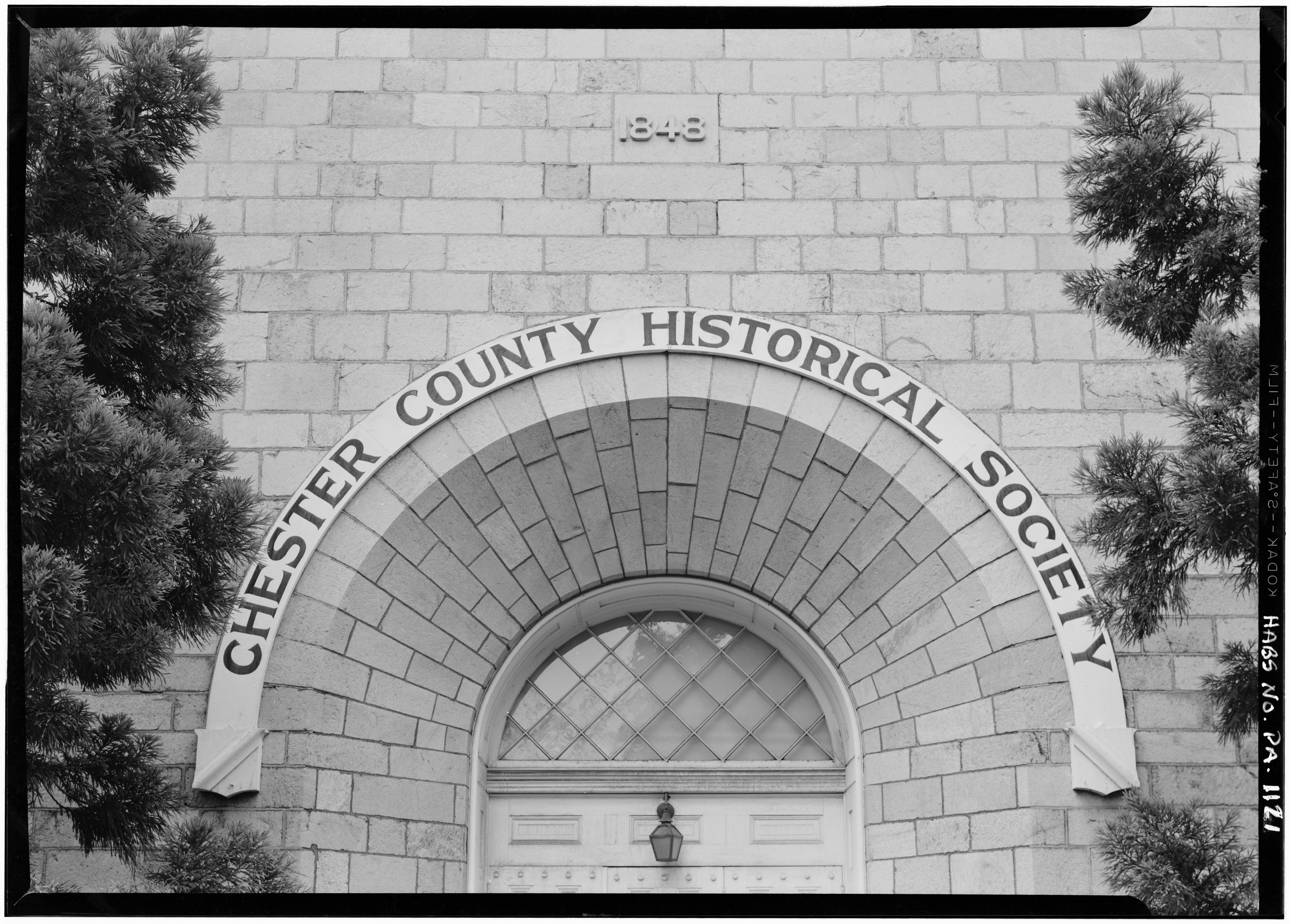
Horticultural Hall in 1958

The History Center is a 56,000-square-foot (5,200 m^{2}) complex that houses a museum, a library, and a 250-seat auditorium. The complex's buildings are connected by an elevated enclosed walkway. The older building, known as Horticultural Hall, was designed by architect Thomas U. Walter in 1848. It was the site of the 1852 Pennsylvania Women's Rights Convention. Uriah Hunt Painter converted it into the West Chester Opera House in the late 1800s. His widow deeded the hall to the local chapter of the Grand Army of the Republic in 1904, stipulating that it was to be given to the CCHC when no longer needed. CCHC moved to the building in 1942 and renovated it in 1979. In 1992, the adjacent YMCA building was incorporated into the complex. Built in 1908 and expanded in 1928, it was designed by architect Charles Barton Keen.

== History ==
The historical society was founded in 1893. Gilbert Cope was among its founding members.

Robert Lukens served as the president of the Chester County History Center from 2011 until his death in 2015. Lukens oversaw renovations and beautification of the society's buildings and other facilities. He obtained state grants for the society and published a historical column in the Daily Local News.

Conor Hepp has served as president of the CCHC since 2020.

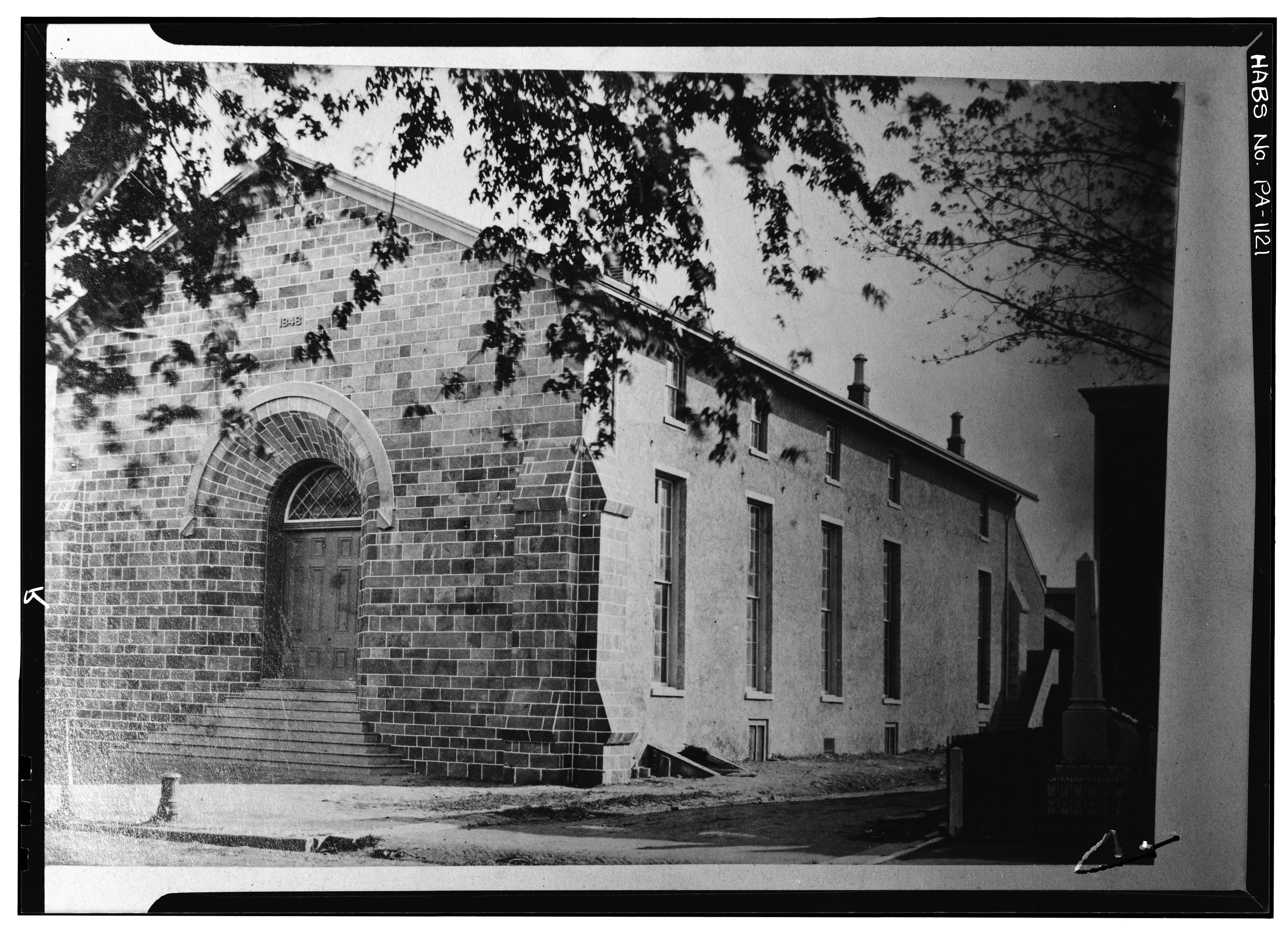
Horticultural Hall in the 1870s

== See also ==
- National Register of Historic Places listings in Chester County, Pennsylvania
- List of historical societies in Pennsylvania
