= Haverford High School =

High school in Havertown, Pennsylvania

Coordinates: 39.9837°N 75.3017°W

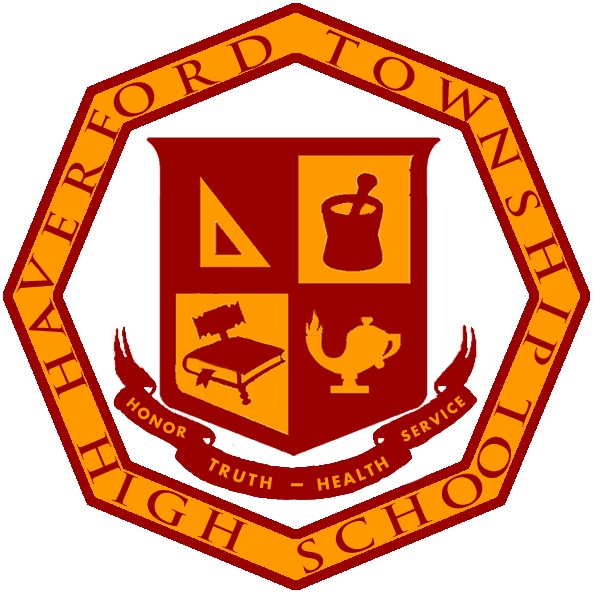

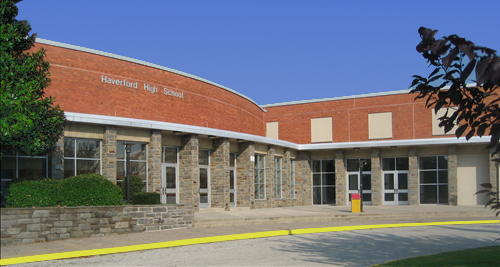
- Haverford High School, 2014

Location
- 200 Mill Rd; Havertown, Pennsylvania 19083; United States

Information
- Type: Public
- Motto: Honor - Truth - Health - Service
- Founded: Building, 1956
- School district: School District of Haverford Township
- Superintendent: Matthew C. Hayes
- Principal: Pete Donaghy
- Teaching staff: 121.77 (FTE)
- Grades: 9-12
- Enrollment: 2,020 (2023–2024)
- Student to teacher ratio: 16.59
- Color: Crimson Gold
- Athletics conference: PIAA District 1 3A/4A Central League
- Mascot: Henry (1929 Model A Ford)
- Newspaper: The Fordian
- Yearbook: Greystones
- Athletic Director: Gregory Decina
- Website: https://hhs.haverford.k12.pa.us/

Haverford Senior High School is the public high school of Haverford Township, Pennsylvania, United States, operated by the School District of Haverford Township. It is at 200 Mill Road in Havertown. The school serves the entirety of Haverford Township, including all of the unincorporated community of "Havertown" (a place name created by the United States Postal Service to designate ZIP code 19083, which is wholly within Haverford Township), and the Haverford Township portions of the unincorporated communities of Haverford, Bryn Mawr, Ardmore, Drexel Hill, and Wynnewood.

== History ==
The first recorded purchase of land for educational purposes in Haverford Township was made on October 28, 1797. A stone structure erected on a site along Darby Road at the crossroads Coopertown served as a school until 1872. Today, known as the Federal School, the building still stands and serves as a window to history for Haverford Township children. Every fourth-grade student spends a day at the Federal School learning what it was like to be a student in 1797.

The Llanerch School was built in 1905 and still stands on Darby Road. It served as the high school until 1910. The Oakmont School was built on Eagle Road at Hathaway Lane in 1912 to serve as the new high school. It remained the high school until 1923. With the dawn of a new decade and World War I in the past, Haverford Township began experiencing another wave of expansion. In 1923, the "new" Haverford High School on Darby Road was completed. It was expanded to include a junior high school in the 1930s and now serves as the Haverford Middle School; it previously housed the school district's administrative offices.

In 1956, the new (and current) Haverford High School was constructed on Mill Road, creating a complex of fields and buildings used by both the high school and the adjacent Haverford Middle School.

The high school building was expanded and modernized from 1996 to 1999. Renovations took a long time and created many issues, one being that one side of the school is higher than the other. The most significant physical addition to the school during these years was the demolition of a small building at the rear center of the (used as counselling suite and lounge area) and the construction of a three-floor addition to house new and spacious science classrooms/laboratories, as well as large seminar classrooms. With this change, rear classrooms in the center of the original building lost exterior windows, and now looked out over open common space adjacent to two new cafeterias, separated by a large new kitchen. Further, this new addition included new administrative offices. This meant that these offices left their original locations along the front of the center wing of the original building. This space became a new principal's office, infirmary, and sewing classroom. A new staircase was added. With the construction of the additions, the wood, metal, and motor shops were eliminated from the building, along with those courses. Wood shop continued to be offered at the Haverford Middle School facility.

=== 2025 bomb threat ===
On December 17, 2025, the faculty and students of the school were evacuated to Haverford Middle School after a computerized voice message gave the location of a possible bomb, a school bathroom. The township's police department were notified, dispatched, and arrived at the school around a minute afterward. Soon after, at 8:50 a.m., 6 bomb-sniffing K-9s were deployed into the school to search for the threat, and the school's students were dismissed around 10:00 a.m. from the middle school. In the end, no bomb was found.

== Sports ==
The Haverford High School sports teams are called the "Fords," and they have a Model T Ford as their mascot. A book about the athletic history of the school (1914 to 2014) was written by Art Sciubba.

== WHHS ==
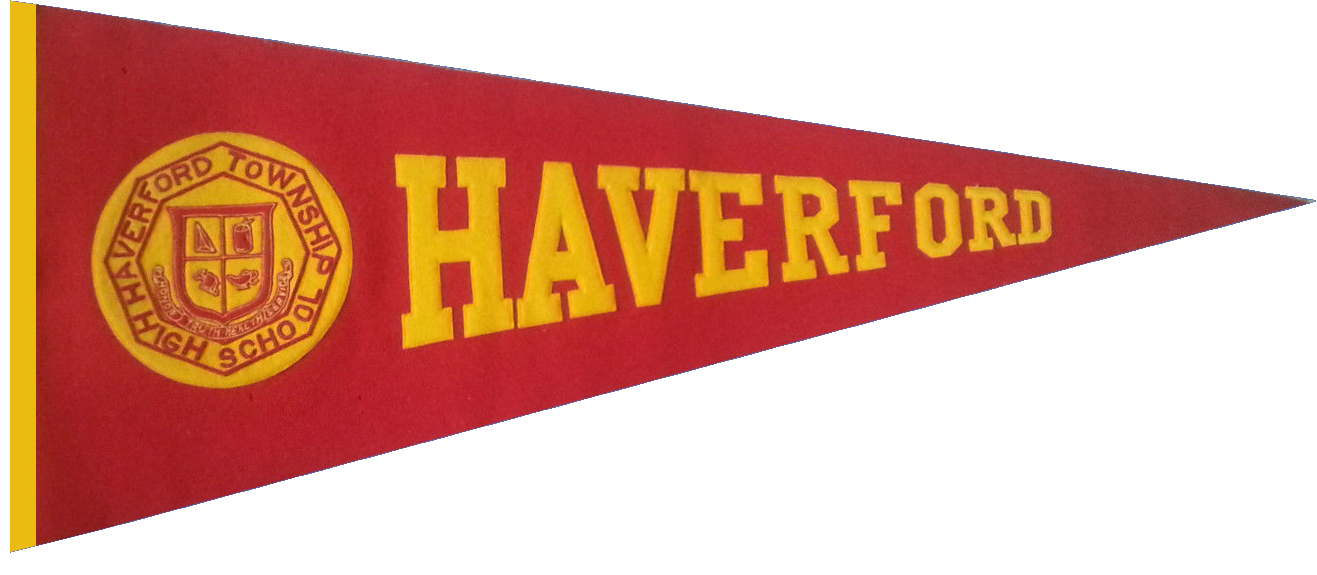
Haverford High pennant

WHHS is the student-run high school radio station of Haverford Senior High School. It is the oldest high school radio station in the country. The station itself is located within the school, and the transmitter is located nearby, covering a 5 to 10-mile radius. WHHS originally occupied 89.3 FM until 1992, when the FCC forced it to change frequencies, and then 107.9 FM, until a new, major radio station based in Philadelphia (WRNB) forced WHHS to change frequencies again. WHHS currently occupies 99.9 FM under a special exemption from the FCC while the station undergoes the formal process of applying for a station license.

Typical show formats include rock, classic rock, rap/hip-hop, sports talk, political talk, and sometimes more eclectic genres like classical or jazz. Occasionally, shows feature live performances from local or school-based bands.

Students apply for a radio show (usually 90 minutes long), and a typical show has two to four hosts. On the basis of interviews and previous experience with the station, students are chosen to fill several positions, including Station Director, Director of Music, and Director of News. The radio station provides an introduction into the radio or communications industries for students interested in careers in these fields.

In 2006, the station began broadcasting live sporting events such as football and hockey, even broadcasting live from the Wachovia Spectrum, the former home of the Philadelphia Flyers and 76ers. The station is continuing to branch out into the community with the effort spearheaded by producing a product that township residents can understand and enjoy while teaching students necessary skills and encouraging creativity. This has been accomplished in many ways, including a 12-hour election day special with interviews before the elections with such politicians and Congressman Curt Weldon and Congressman-elect Joe Sestak.

== Alumni ==
- Craig Bickhardt, country singer/songwriter and guitarist; Class of 1972
- Garrett Brown, inventor of the steadicam
- Shayne Culpepper, two-time Olympian in track and field, in 2004 in the 5,000m and in 2000 in the 1,500m; Class of 1992
- Emily deRiel, 2000 Summer Olympics silver medalist in modern pentathlon; Class of 1992
- Mark DiFelice, Major League Baseball pitcher for the Milwaukee Brewers organization; Class of 1994
- Jimmy Dykes, third and second baseman for the Philadelphia Athletics and Chicago White Sox; Manager of the Chicago White Sox, Philadelphia Athletics, Baltimore Orioles, Cincinnati Reds, Detroit Tigers, and Cleveland Indians
- Rick Fisher, two-time Tony Award winner for lighting design; Class of 1972
- Alex G, singer-songwriter; Class of 2011
- Samantha Gongol, musician, part of the duo Marian Hill; Class of 2008
- Randy Grossman, former tight end for the Pittsburgh Steelers in the National Football League; four-time Super Bowl Champion; Class of 1970
- Brendan Hansen, 2004, 2008, 2012 Summer Olympic Games breaststroke swimmer
- William Hoeveler, lawyer and judge
- Steve Joachim, former professional football player for the New York Jets; won the Maxwell Award in 1974
- George R. Johnson, Pennsylvania State Representative for the 166th district (1967-1972)
- Ross Katz, Academy Award-nominated film producer
- Joe Lunardi, ESPN's March Madness Bracketologist
- Buddy Marucci, 2008 United States Senior Men's Amateur Golf Champion, US Walker Cup Captain 2007 and 2009, 1995 U.S. Amateur runner-up
- Clay Myers, photographer, animal welfare advocate; Class of 1976
- Mitchel Resnick, MIT professor; creator of programmable bricks, the forerunner of LEGO Mindstorms, and Scratch software; co-founder of Computer Clubhouse
- Pia Reyes, November 1988 Playboy centerfold
- David Ricketts, singer, musician, songwriter, producer for A&M Records; Class of 1972
- Louis Robertshaw, lieutenant general in the United States Marine Corps
- Ivan Roulston, NFL Center
- Shane Ryan, 2016 Olympic swimmer; class of 2012
- Michael Sembello, guitarist, singer/songwriter; Class of 1972
- Jean Shiley, 1932 Olympic gold medal winner
- Ron Shumon, former NFL player
- Andy Talley, head coach of Villanova University Football
- Judy Toll, comedian, writer, and actress
- Michael Tollin, director and producer
- Jennifer Toof, appeared on VH1's Flavor of Love 2, Flavor of Love Girls: Charm School, and I Love Money
- Sam Venuto, former running back in the NFL
- Tom Verica, actor and director; Class of 1982
- Charles Alan Wright (1927-2000), constitutional lawyer widely considered to have been the foremost authority in the US on constitutional law and federal procedure; law professor, University of Texas School of Law (1955-2000), University of Minnesota Law School (1950-1955); Class of 1944
- Mark G. Yudof, President, University of California (June 2008–present); former chancellor, University of Texas system (August 2002 to May 2008); former president, University of Minnesota (1997 to 2002); Class of 1962
