= Garnet Valley School District =

School district in Pennsylvania

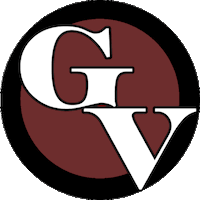

Address
- 80 Station Road Glen Mills, Pennsylvania, 19342; United States

District information
- Type: PUBLIC
- Motto: Ready to learn. Go forth to serve.
- Grades: K-12
- Established: January 1959
- Superintendent: Dr Marc S Bertrando
- Schools: 5

Students and staff
- Enrollment: 4,821
- Teachers: 415
- Student–teacher ratio: 28:1
- Athletic conference: Central Athletic League
- Colours: Garnet and white

Other information
- Website: www.garnetvalleyschools.com

Garnet Valley School District (GVSD) is a public school district based in Glen Mills, Pennsylvania, within the Greater Philadelphia area. GVSD serves the town of Chester Heights, Bethel Township and Concord Township. Founded in 1959, it is one of the youngest school districts in Pennsylvania. Garnet Valley is one of the leading school districts, competing academically and athletically amongst the top decile schools in the state. The district is run by a school board consisting of nine elected, unpaid members. In addition to the school board, the student body of Garnet Valley High School elects two student representatives for a one-year term that runs concurrent with the fiscal year. These representatives serve in a non-voting advisory capacity.

Garnet Valley is a member of the Central Athletic League since 2008. Founded in 1967, the Central Athletic League aims to foster good sportsmanship for the Delaware Valley's most talented men and women student-athletes.

== History ==
The Garnet Valley School System was formally organized on March 30, 1959. From school year '59-'60 to school year '62-'63, Garnet Valley existed as a Junior High School housed in the Old Concord Elementary School building on Bethel Road for Grades 7 through 9. Students were then sent to Media High School for Grades 10 through 12. The last class sent to Media High School was the Class of 1965, and the first class to graduate from Garnet Valley High School was the Class of 1966.

In 2000, the Garnet Valley Middle School was selected as a Blue Ribbon School of Excellence by the United States Department of Education In both 1999 and 2001 Garnet Valley High School received the Blue Ribbon Award of Excellence from the Pennsylvania Department of Education.

From 1993 to 2006, Garnet Valley was known as the fastest growing school district in the state of Pennsylvania. As a result, expansion for all of the schools was required.

=== Elementary Schools (District Offices) ===
In September 1997, Garnet Valley Elementary School opened. In September 1999, a classroom wing across the back of the building, the "Reader's Park" courtyard, and the Garnet Valley Education Center, where the district's offices are located, were also opened. In September 2002, Bethel Springs Elementary School opened. In September 2006, Concord Elementary School was rebuilt at a new location.

=== Garnet Valley Middle School ===
In September 1991, Garnet Valley Middle School opened. In September 2000, due to the exponential student growth throughout the school district, the middle school completed a renovation which included the expansion of the core facilities (art wing addition and cafeteria renovation, completed in September 1999, new gymnasium, completed in January 2000, and guidance / administrative offices, completed in August 2000), and the construction of 13 general education classrooms and 2 science labs, also completed in September 1999. In November 2005, due to a shortage of classrooms, they opened an addition that consists of 12 general education classrooms and 2 Science labs, and they renovated the nurse's office. In October 2016, the cafeteria was renovated for the second time, due to overcrowding in the old cafeteria, and the library was renovated to accommodate modern technology in the future.

=== Garnet Valley High School ===
The construction of the Garnet Valley High School began in May 1962, and the school was opened in September 1963. In January 2003, due to the same exponential student growth throughout the school district, the high school completed phase 1 of a major renovation which included the expansion of the core facilities (new art wing, completed in January 2001, new gymnasium and library, completed in September 2001, new cafeteria, faculty room, and staff planning areas, completed in September 2002, and performing arts center, nurse's office, and guidance / administrative offices, completed in October 2002), and the construction of an additional general education wing, also completed in January 2001, that was designed to accept a second floor. In September 2006, the high school completed phase 2 which included the renovation of the Science, Health, and Business Technology wings along with the construction of the new general education wing's second floor, completed in February 2006, and the Morris (Moe) DeFrank Football Stadium. In August 2017, The new gymnasium's flooring was replaced, the cafeteria's serving areas were upgraded, and the library was renovated in order to be able to accommodate modern technology in the future. In November 2018, the Moe DeFrank stadium was upgraded and repaired due to significant wear and tear over the past several years.

== Schools within the district ==
| School | Opened | Grades | Website | Photo |
|---|---|---|---|---|
| Garnet Valley High School | 1963 September 4 | 9–12 | Website | |
| Garnet Valley Middle School | 1991 September 4 | 6–8 | Website | |
| Garnet Valley Elementary School | 1997 September 3 | 3–5 | Website | |
| Bethel Springs Elementary School | 2002 September 4 | 1–5 | Website | |
| Concord Elementary School | 2006 September 6 | K–2 | Website | |

=== Former schools ===
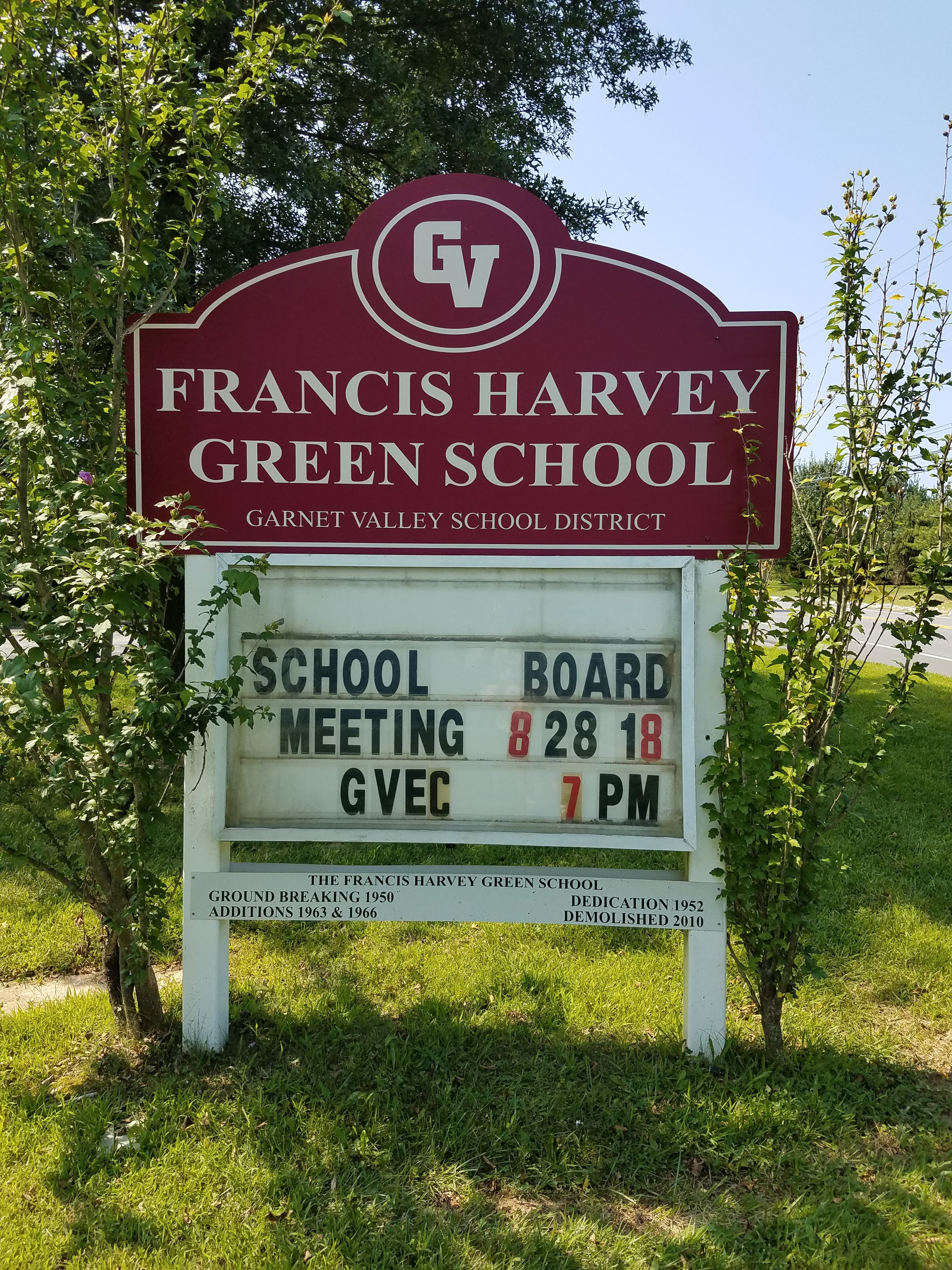
Francis Harvey Green School Sign

| School | Opened | Closed |
|---|---|---|
| Concord School | 1949 | 2006 |
| Francis Harvey Green School | 1952 | 1991 |

=== Notes ===
Both Francis Harvey Green School and Concord Elementary School were leased to the Delaware County Intermediate Unit for special education, in 1991 and 2006 respectively.

Concord Elementary School was relocated to a new building on Station Road, Glen Mills in September 2006 and the old school building, on Bethel Road, was renamed Pennington School. Pennington School is currently leased by the district to the Delaware County Intermediate Unit for the education of special-needs children.

Francis Harvey Green School was demolished in November 2010.

== Leadership ==
=== School board ===
The district is run by a nine-member school board of directors who are elected to four-year terms each. Elections are held every odd-numbered year. Four to five directors are generally elected at any one time. At an annual organization meeting held the first week of December, the School Board chooses a President and Vice President for the coming calendar year. A primary responsibility of the board is to set district policy, which is then implemented by the administration. Another major responsibility is to approve the annual budget and set tax rates. The fiscal year covered by the budget runs from July 1 to June 30. In addition to the school board, the student body of Garnet Valley High School elects two student representatives for a one-year term that runs concurrent with the fiscal year. These representatives serve in a non-voting advisory capacity.

GVSD Board of Director
| | Current member name | Role | Current term began in | Current term expires in |
|---|---|---|---|---|
| Place 1 | Robert Hayes | President | 2021 | 2025 |
| Place 2 | Rosemary Fiumara | Vice-president | 2019 | 2023 |
| Place 3 | Mary Kay Beirne | Member | 2019 | 2023 |
| Place 4 | Scott Mayer | Member | 2021 | 2023 |
| Place 5 | Greg Chestnut | Member | 2019 | 2023 |
| Place 6 | Maria Deysher | Member | 2019 | 2023 |
| Place 7 | Tracy Karwoski | Member | 2019 | 2023 |
| Place 8 | Robert Anderson | Member | 2017 | 2021 |
| Place 9 | Vinit Dhruva | Member | 2021 | 2025 |

==== Superintendents ====
The school board works with a paid superintendent. From 1964 to 2021, GVSD has been led by seven superintendents as follows:

Superintendents of GVSD
| Years active | Name |
|---|---|
| 1964-1972 | B.H. Davis (Bennett H. Davis) |
| 1972-1980 | H.F. Hofmann (Henry F. Hoffmann) |
| 1980-1987 | W.A. Byrd (William A. Byrd) |
| 1987-1991 | V.R. Wyland (Vemon R. Wyland) |
| 1991-2010 | A.V. Costello (Anthony V. Costello) |
| 2010-2012 | M.L. Christian (Michael L. Christian) |
| 2012-2012 | A.V. Costello (Anthony V. Costello) [Acting] |
| 2012–present | M.S. Bertrando (Marc Bertrando) |

== Phone Policy Contributions ==
Garnet Valley School District Superintendent Marc Bertrando has taken an alternate approach to handling the technological and psychological crisis of phone addiction in education. Contrary to some other Philadelphia-area school districts, who have opted to try banning phones outright, Bertrando and school board members have tried to find a solution cognisant of the wants and needs of students. Heavily informed by student advocates from the Middle School to High School levels, the "Developing Digitally Disciplined Students Committee" has attacked the underlying causes of phone addiction, like lack of student interest in their own education. To this end, Garnet Valley School District has begun work on tailoring classes to "keep kids engaged," among other changes.
