= Marple Newtown School District =

School district in Pennsylvania

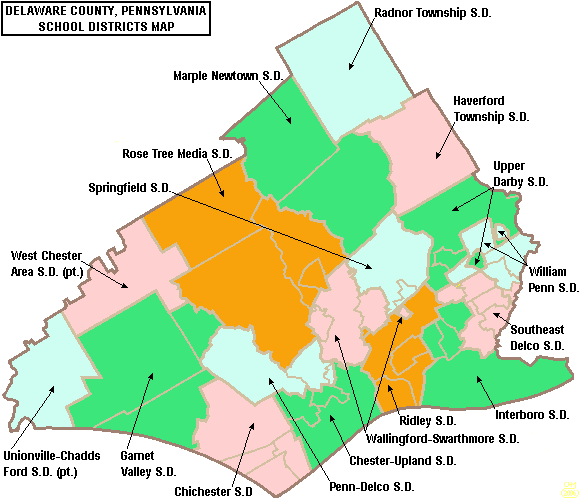

Address
- 40 Media Line Rd Ste 209 Newtown Square, Delaware County, Pennsylvania, 19073-4614; United States

District information
- Type: Public

Students and staff
- District mascot: Tiger
- Colors: Black and orange

Other information
- Website: http://www.mnsd.org/

Marple Newtown School District (MNSD) is a public school district which serves Newtown Township and Marple Township in Delaware County, Pennsylvania. Marple Newtown School District encompasses approximately 21 square miles (54 km^{2}). According to 2000 federal census data, it serves a resident population of 35,437. The student demographic is about 82% Caucasian, 10% Asian, 3% Black, and 3% Hispanic with 50% being male and 50% being female.

== Schools ==
High School

- Marple Newtown Senior High School

Middle School

- Paxon Hollow Middle School

Elementary schools

- Culbertson Elementary School
- Loomis Elementary School
- Russell Elementary School
- Worrall Elementary School

Former schools:

- Alice Grim Elementary School - It was to close in June 1982

== Extracurriculars ==
The district offers a wide variety of clubs, activities and an extensive sports program.

=== Visual and performing arts ===
In 2019, Marple Newtown was named a "Best Community for Music Education" by the NAMM Foundation. It also received the award in 2013, 2014, 2015 and 2016.

The Marple Newtown High School Tiger Marching Band has won three Cavalcade of Bands open-class championships (2014, 2015 and 2016).

In 1975, the Tiger Marching Band performed on ice at the Spectrum with the Ice Capades.

== Notable alumni ==
- Marta Kauffman, co-creator of NBC sitcom Friends
- Mia Dillon, American actress
- Bruce Davison (1964), American actor and director
- Adrian Pasdar, American actor and voice artist
- Chris Wheeler, former announcer and color commentator for the Philadelphia Phillies
- David Miscavige, leader of the Church of Scientology
- Nicole Brewer, American news reporter and former Miss Pennsylvania
- Bill Maas, American football player
- Lynne Talley (1971), American oceanographer
- Jeffrey Zaslow, American author and journalist
- Kevin J. Jacobsen, retired US Air Force Brigadier General
- Sarah Anderson, American curler
- George Schmitt, American football player
- Bob Speca Jr., world record holder for domino toppling
- Joel Johnston, Major League Baseball player
- James Fullington, professional wrestler
- Taylor Anderson-Heide, American Olympic curler
